= Karl, 8th Prince Kinsky of Wchinitz and Tettau =

Karl
- Prince Kinsky of Wchinitz and Tettau
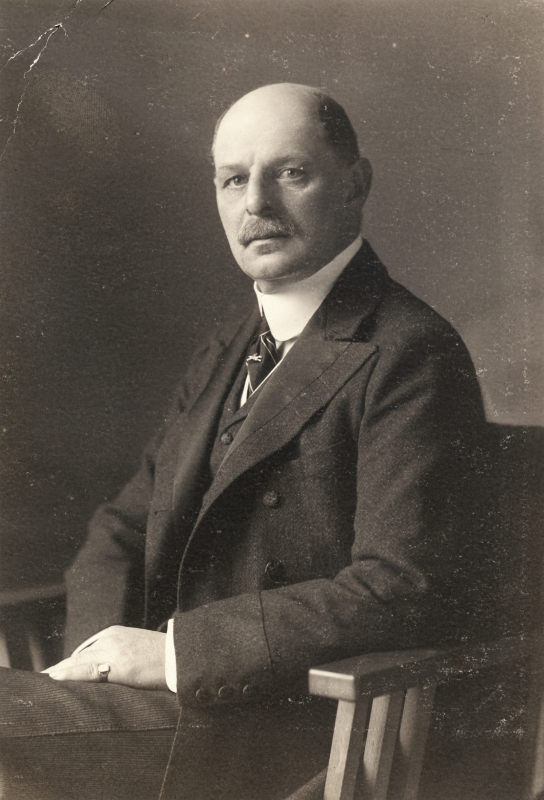
- Born: 29 November 1858; Vienna, Austrian Empire
- Died: 11 December 1919 (aged 61)
- Spouse: Countess Elisabeth Wolff-Metternich zur Gracht (m. 1895; died 1909)
Names
- Karl Rudolf Ferdinand Andreas
- House: Kinsky
- Father: Ferdinand Bonaventura, 7th Prince Kinsky of Wchinitz and Tettau
- Mother: Princess Maria of Liechtenstein

Karl, 8th Prince Kinsky of Wchinitz and Tettau (German: Karl Rudolf Ferdinand Andreas Fürst Kinsky von Wchinitz und Tettau; 29 November 1858 – 11 December 1919) was the 8th Prince Kinsky of Wchinitz and Tettau.

== Early life ==
Karl was born in Vienna, the capital of the Austrian Empire, as the son of Ferdinand Bonaventura, 7th Prince Kinsky of Wchinitz and Tettau (1834–1904), the head of the princely line of the House of Kinsky, and Princess Marie of Liechtenstein (1835–1905).

Karl was born into the family's great equine tradition and inherited a love of horses. A servant, the Kinskys’ master of the horse, Rowland Reynolds, who had two great loves, England and the Grand National steeplechase, was to prove a great influence on Karl, passing on his passions to the young Count.

Karl first visited England as part of the retinue of Empress Elisabeth of Austria in the late 1870s. The Empress arranged to visit Liverpool and see the famous steeplechase which provided Kinsky with his first opportunity to witness the event. Later, in 1882, he bought the 3rd-place horse in the 1882 Grand National, 5-year-old mare Zoedone and won on her the following year.

== Marriage ==
Karl married on 7 January 1895 in Herdringen, Arnsberg, to Countess Elisabeth Wolff-Metternich zur Gracht (1874–1909). They had no children.

== Ambitions ==
Karl achieved his two greatest British goals in rapid succession. First, he was made Austro-Hungarian attaché to Britain; and second, he rode his own horse, Zoedone, to win the 1883 Grand National. He was distraught when Zoedone was poisoned on the race day two years later.

=== Relationship with Jennie Jerome ===
Karl was involved in an affair with Lady Randolph Churchill, wife of Lord Randolph Churchill and the American-born mother of Sir Winston Churchill. She was four years his senior, a famous socialite, and one of the most beautiful women of the time, and he was completely infatuated by her. Lady Randolph Churchill has been described as being a captivating woman, whose looks and demeanor made her almost irresistible. She was powerful, having social and romantic contacts that could make or break anyone wishing to climb in social status in the Britain of the time.

She later claimed that she would not have spent the time that she did with Kinsky were it not for the unfounded rumours of an affair being spread by society gossips, and her desire to spend time with him was simply for spite. However, accounts from the time do indicate that the two were involved romantically, and the only motivation for quelling the rumours was that this affair was a semi-secret one.

In this period, having extra-marital affairs was not uncommon among the upper classes. Her affairs were rumored to have included the Prince of Wales (later Edward VII). Her affairs may have even assisted Lord Randolph’s political and social standing. At the time of Kinsky's affair with Jennie Churchill, she likely wielded more power behind the scenes than did Kinsky, and it would have been he who would have benefited more from the affair. Although she certainly had friendships with many powerful men, it is unknown whether every relationship was sexual.

=== World War I and after ===
Karl remained in England until 1914 when Austria-Hungary went to war with Britain. Keen to do his duty, but unwilling to fight the country he regarded as his second home, Kinsky volunteered to fight on the dreaded Russian front. He survived but returned to a broken homeland and the knowledge that it was unlikely he would ever be welcome in England again. A broken man, Karl died in 1919.

== Ancestry ==
Ancestors of Karl, 8th Prince Kinsky of Wchinitz and Tettau

8. Ferdinand, 5th Prince Kinsky of Wchinitz and Tettau
4. Rudolf, 6th Prince Kinsky of Wchinitz and Tettau
9. Baroness Maria Charlotte of Kerpen
2. Ferdinand Bonaventura, 7th Prince Kinsky of Wchinitz and Tettau
10. Count Hieronymus of Colloredo-Mannsfeld
5. Countess Wilhelmine of Colloredo-Mannsfeld
11. Countess Wilhelmine of Waldstein-Wartenberg
1. Karl, 8th Prince Kinsky of Wchinitz and Tettau
12. Prince Karl of Liechtenstein
6. Prince Karl of Liechtenstein
13. Countess Josepha of Khevenhüller-Metsch
3. Princess Maria of Liechtenstein
14. Rudolf, Count of Wrbna and Freudenthal
7. Countess Franzisca of Wrbna and Freudenthal
15. Countess Maria Theresia of Kaunitz-Rietberg-Questenberg

== Popular culture ==
He is portrayed in the 1974 television series, Jennie: Lady Randolph Churchill, by the actor Jeremy Brett.

== Notes and sources ==
- Almanach de Gotha, Reference: 1874 150; 1924 426

Karl, 8th Prince Kinsky of Wchinitz and Tettau House of Kinsky Born: 29 November 1858 Died: 11 December 1919
Titles of nobility
Preceded by Ferdinand Bonaventura	Prince Kinsky of Wchinitz and Tettau; 2 January 1904 – 3 April 1919	Succeeded by Republic declared
Titles in pretence
Loss of title Republic declared	— TITULAR — Prince Kinsky of Wchinitz and Tettau; 3 April 1919 – 11 December 1919; Reason for succession failure: Austrian nobility titles abolished	Succeeded by Rudolf
