= Rudolf, 9th Prince Kinsky of Wchinitz and Tettau =

Rudolf
- Prince Kinsky of Wchinitz and Tettau
- Born: 11 December 1859; Hermanmiestetz, Kingdom of Bohemia
- Died: 13 March 1930 (aged 70); Lissa, Republic of Poland
- Spouse: Countess Marie of Wilczek (m. 1881)
- Issue: Marie Gabrielle, Princess Erich of Thurn und Taxis; Maria Antonie, Countess Theobald Czernin of Chudenitz; Countess Emma; Wilhelmine, Countess Carl Czernin of Chudenitz; Countess Theresia Maria
Names
- Rudolf Ferdinand Joseph Damasus
- House: House of Kinsky
- Father: Ferdinand Bonaventura, 7th Prince Kinsky of Wchinitz and Tettau
- Mother: Princess Maria of Liechtenstein

Rudolf, 9th Prince Kinsky of Wchinitz and Tettau (German: Rudolf Fürst Kinsky von Wchinitz und Tettau; 11 December 1859 – 13 March 1930) was the titular pretender Prince Kinsky of Wchinitz and Tettau.

== Early life ==
Rudolf was born at Hermanmiestetz, Kingdom of Bohemia the third child and second son of Ferdinand Bonaventura, 7th Prince Kinsky of Wchinitz and Tettau (1834–1904) and Princess Maria of Liechtenstein (1835–1905).

== Marriage and family ==
Rudolf married on 20 September 1881 in Vienna to Countess Marie of Wilczek (1858–1938), eldest child of Graf Johann Nepomuk of Wilczek and his wife, Countess Emma Maria Helene Emo Capodilista.

They had five daughters:

- Countess Marie Gabrielle Josepha Guntram Kinsky of Wchinitz and Tettau (28 March 1883 – 28 October 1970), married in 1903 to Prince Erich of Thurn and Taxis; had issue.
- Countess Maria Antonie Kinsky of Wchinitz and Tettau (21 May 1885 – 3 July 1952), married in 1903 to Count Theobald Czernin of Chudenitz; had issue.
- Countess Emma Kinsky of Wchinitz and Tettau (13 March 1888 – 2 December 1957)
- Countess Wilhelmine Kinsky of Wchinitz and Tettau (6 July 1891 – 17 June 1971), married in 1912 to Count Carl Maria Joseph Czernin of Chudenitz; had issue.
- Countess Theresia Kinsky of Wchinitz and Tettau (13 January 1902 – 11 November 1973)

== Prince Kinsky ==
He became the titular pretender 9th Prince Kinsky of Wchinitz and Tettau at the death of his brother Karl in 1919, his brother died childless. As for him, without a male heir the title was passed to his nephew Ulrich at his death in 1930.

== Ancestry ==
Ancestors of Rudolf, 9th Prince Kinsky of Wchinitz and Tettau

16. Joseph, 4th Prince Kinsky of Wchinitz and Tettau
8. Ferdinand, 5th Prince Kinsky of Wchinitz and Tettau
17. Countess Rosa of Harrach of Rohrau and Thannhausen
4. Rudolf, 6th Prince Kinsky of Wchinitz and Tettau
18. Baron Franz of Kerpen
9. Baroness Maria Charlotte of Kerpen
19. Baroness Maria Antonetta of Hornstein-Göffingen
2. Ferdinand Bonaventura, 7th Prince Kinsky of Wchinitz and Tettau
20. Franz Gundackar, Prince of Colloredo-Mannsfeld
10. Count Hieronymus of Colloredo-Mannsfeld
21. Countess Maria Isabella of Mansfeld
5. Countess Wilhelmine of Colloredo-Mannsfeld
22. Georg Christian, Count of Waldstein
11. Countess Wilhelmine of Waldstein
23. Elisabeth, Countess Ulfeldt
1. Rudolf, 9th Prince Kinsky of Wchinitz and Tettau
24. Prince Carl Borromäus of Liechtenstein
12. Prince Karl of Liechtenstein
25. Princess Eleonore of Oettingen-Spielberg
6. Prince Karl of Liechtenstein
26. Franz Anton, Count of Khevenhüller-Metsch
13. Countess Josepha of Khevenhüller-Metsch
27. Countess Maria Theresia of Rottal
3. Princess Maria of Liechtenstein
28. Count Eugen Wenzel of Wrbna and Freudenthal
14. Rudolf, Count of Wrbna and Freudenthal
29. Count Maria Theresia Kollonitz of Kollegrad
7. Countess Franzisca of Wrbna and Freudenthal
30. Dominik Andreas, Prince of Kaunitz-Rietberg
15. Countess Maria Theresia of Kaunitz-Rietberg-Questenberg
31. Countess Bernhardine of Plettenberg-Wittem

== Notes and sources ==
- Genealogisches Handbuch des Adels, Fürstliche Häuser, Reference: 1956

Rudolf, 9th Prince Kinsky of Wchinitz and Tettau House of Kinsky Born: 11 December 1859 Died: 13 March 1930
Titles in pretence
Preceded by Karl	— TITULAR — Prince Kinsky of Wchinitz and Tettau; 11 December 1919 – 13 March 1930; Reason for succession failure: Austrian nobility titles abolished	Succeeded by Ulrich
