= Ulrich, 10th Prince Kinsky of Wchinitz and Tettau =

Ulrich
- Prince Kinsky of Wchinitz and Tettau
- Born: 15 August 1893; Chotzen, Kingdom of Bohemia
- Died: 19 December 1938 (aged 45); Vienna, Nazi Germany
- Spouse: Countess Katalin Széchényi de Sárvár-Felsövidek (m. 1918; div. 1930) Baroness Marie von dem Bussche-Haddenhausen (m. 1932)
- Issue: Count Ulrich Karl; Countess Maria; Countess Charlotte; Countess Eleonore; Countess Aglaë; Franz Ulrich, 11th Prince Kinsky of Wchinitz and Tettau
Names
- Ulrich Ferdinand Adolf Antonius Bonaventura Maria
- House: House of Kinsky
- Father: Count Ferdinand Kinsky of Wchinitz and Tettau
- Mother: Princess Aglaë of Auersperg

Ulrich, 10th Prince Kinsky of Wchinitz and Tettau (German: Ulrich Ferdinand Adolf Antonius Bonaventura Maria Fürst Kinsky von Wchinitz und Tettau; 15 August 1893 – 19 December 1938) was the titular pretender Prince Kinsky of Wchinitz and Tettau.

== Early life ==
Ulrich was born at Chotzen, Kingdom of Bohemia the eldest child of Count Ferdinand Vincent Kinsky von Wchinitz und Tettau (1866–1916) (sixth child of Ferdinand Bonaventura, 7th Prince Kinsky of Wchinitz and Tettau and Countess Wilhelmine of Colloredo-Mansfeld) and Princess Aglaë of Auersperg (1868–1919) (fourth child of Prince Adolf of Auersperg and Countess Johanna Festetics de Tolna).

== Marriage and family ==
Ulrich married on 19 January 1918 in Budapest to Countess Katalin Széchényi de Sárvár-Felsövidek (1893–1968), youngest daughter of Count Imre Széchényi de Sárvár-Felsövidék, and his wife, Countess Maria Andrássy de Csik-Szent-Király et Kraszna-Horka. They divorced in 1930.

They had three children:

- Count Ulrich Kinsky of Wchinitz and Tettau (9 December 1918 – 1929)
- Countess Maria Kinsky of Wchinitz and Tettau (5 June 1924 – 14 February 1960), (1) married in 1945 to Margrave Friedrich Pallavicini, divorced in 1949; one son. (2) married in 1950 to Pier-Luigi Tagliaferri, divorced in 1959; no issue. (3) married in 1959 to Conte Alvise Sagramoso-Sacchetti; no issue.
- Countess Charlotte Kinsky of Wchinitz and Tettau (born 18 November 1927), married in 1956 to Dimitri Borissovich Manakoff; no issue.

He married secondly on 10 March 1932 in Munich to Baroness Marie von dem Bussche-Haddenhausen (1900–1974), eldest daughter of Baron Hilmar von dem Bussche-Haddenhausen, and his wife Maria Eleonore Martinez de Hoz, first cousin twice removed of Argentina's Minister of Economy José Alfredo Martínez de Hoz. Her first husband was Walther von Mumm.

They had three children:

- Countess Eleonore Kinsky of Wchinitz and Tettau (22 November 1932 – 23 March 1983), married in 1961 to Carlos Enrique Daireaux; had issue.
- Countess Aglaë Kinsky of Wchinitz and Tettau (born 22 November 1932)
- Franz Ulrich, 11th Prince Kinsky of Wchinitz and Tettau (7 October 1936 – 2 April 2009), married in 1965 to Roberta Cavanagh; had issue.

== Prince Kinsky ==
He became the titular pretender 10th Prince Kinsky of Wchinitz and Tettau at the death of his uncle Rudolf in 1930, his uncle died without male heir. At his death, the title was inherited by his only surviving son Franz Ulrich.

== Ancestry ==
Ancestors of Ulrich, 10th Prince Kinsky of Wchinitz and Tettau

16. Ferdinand, 5th Prince Kinsky of Wchinitz and Tettau
8. Rudolf, 6th Prince Kinsky of Wchinitz and Tettau
17. Baroness Maria Charlotte of Kerpen
4. Ferdinand Bonaventura, 7th Prince Kinsky of Wchinitz and Tettau
18. Count Hieronymus of Colloredo-Mannsfeld
9. Countess Wilhelmine of Colloredo-Mannsfeld
19. Countess Wilhelmine of Waldstein
2. Count Ferdinand Kinsky of Wchinitz and Tettau
20. Prince Karl of Liechtenstein
10. Prince Karl of Liechtenstein
21. Countess Josepha of Khevenhüller-Metsch
5. Princess Maria of Liechtenstein
22. Rudolf, Count of Wrbna and Freudenthal
11. Countess Franzisca of Wrbna and Freudenthal
23. Countess Maria Theresia of Kaunitz-Rietberg-Questenberg
1. Ulrich, 10th Prince Kinsky of Wchinitz and Tettau
24. William I, Prince of Auersperg
12. William II, Prince of Auersperg
25. Countess Leopoldine of Waldstein
6. Prince Adolf of Auersperg
26. Carl von Lenthe
13. Friederike von Lenthe
27. Countess Sophie of Bennigsen
3. Princess Aglaë of Auersperg
28. Count János Jószef Festetics de Tolna
14. Count Ernö Festetics de Tolna
29. Franziska Constance Horváth de Zalabér
7. Countess Johanna Festetics de Tolna
30. Baron Wenceslaus Erasmus Koc of Dobrse
15. Baroness Johanna Kotz of Dobrze
31. Countess Johanna of Clam and Gallas

== Notes and sources ==
- Genealogisches Handbuch des Adels, Fürstliche Häuser, Reference: 1956

Ulrich, 10th Prince Kinsky of Wchinitz and Tettau House of Kinsky Born: 15 August 1893 Died: 19 December 1938
Titles in pretence
Preceded by Rudolf	— TITULAR — Prince Kinsky of Wchinitz and Tettau; 13 March 1930 – 19 December 1938; Reason for succession failure: Austrian nobility titles abolished	Succeeded by Franz Ulrich
