= Prince Ferdinand =

Prince Ferdinand may refer to:

- Ferdinand I of León and Castile (1017-1065)
- Ferdinand II of León (1137-188)
- Ferdinand, Count of Flanders (1188-1233)
- Ferdinand III of Castile (1199-1252)
- Prince Fernando, Lord of Serpa (after 1217 - ca. 1243)
- Ferdinand de la Cerda (1253-1275)
- Ferdinand IV of Castile (1285-1312)
- Ferdinand I of Aragon (1380-1416)
- Ferdinand the Saint Prince (1402-1443)
- Ferdinand I of Naples (1423-1494)
- Infante Ferdinand, Duke of Viseu (1433-1470)
- Ferdinand II of Aragon (1452-1516)
- Ferdinand II of Naples (1469-1496)
- Ferdinand I, Holy Roman Emperor (1503-1564)
- Infante Ferdinand, Duke of Guarda and Trancoso (1507-1534)
- Ferdinand, Prince of Asturias (1571-1578)
- Ferdinand of Bavaria (archbishop) (1577-1650)
- Ferdinand Maximilian, Hereditary Prince of Baden-Baden (1625-1669)
- Ferdinand IV, King of the Romans (1633-1654)
- Ferdinand VI of Spain (1713-1759)
- Ferdinand I, Duke of Parma (1751-1802)
- Ferdinand I of the Two Sicilies (1751-1825)
- Ferdinand, 5th Prince Kinsky of Wchinitz and Tettau (1781-1812)
- Ferdinand VII of Spain (1784-1833)
- Prince Ferdinand of Saxe-Coburg and Gotha (1785-1851)
- Ferdinand, Hereditary Prince of Denmark (1792-1863)
- Ferdinand I of Austria (1793-1875)
- Prince Ferdinand Philippe, Duke of Orléans (1810-1842)
- Ferdinand II of the Two Sicilies (1810-1859)
- Ferdinand II of Portugal (1816-1885)
- Prince Ferdinand, Duke of Genoa (1822–1855)
- Ferdinand Bonaventura, 7th Prince Kinsky of Wchinitz and Tettau (1834-1904)
- Prince Ferdinand, Duke of Alençon (1844-1910)
- Infante Ferdinand of Portugal (1846-1861)
- Ferdinand I of Bulgaria (1861-1948)
- Ferdinand I of Romania (1865-1927)
- Prince Ferdinand Pius, Duke of Calabria (1869-1960)
- Prince Ferdinand, Duke of Montpensier (1884-1924)
- Prince Ferdinand of Bavaria (1884-1958)
- Prince Ferdinando, Duke of Genoa (1884-1963)
- Prince Ferdinand, Duke of Castro (1926-2008)
- Ferdinand von Bismarck (born 1930)
