= Ferdinand Vincent, Count of Kinsky =

Czech nobleman, Austro-Hungarian officer and courtier

Ferdinand Vincent Rudolf Count Kinsky of Vchynice and Tetov (8 September 1866, Dornau – 3 February 1916, Vienna) was a Czech nobleman, Austro-Hungarian officer and courtier.

After serving in the army, he held functions at the court in Vienna, finally he was the Emperor's Master of the Horse (1909–1916), he was awarded the Order of the Golden Fleece (1915). The princely branch of the Kinsky family continued in his descendants.

== Biography ==
He came from the princely line of the Czech noble family of Kinsky. He was the third and youngest son of Prince Ferdinand Bonaventura Kinsky (1834–1904) and Maria Josepha of Liechtenstein (1835–1905). As the younger son of the Prince, he used the title of Count and served in the army from a young age. In the army, he eventually reached the rank of Lieutenant Colonel of dragoons, and received the Order of the Iron Crown 3rd class (1898) and the Order of Leopold (1906).

After leaving active military service, he worked at the imperial court. In 1907 he was appointed to the privy council and in 1908 he received the Grand Cross of the Order of Franz Joseph. In the years 1909–1916, he held the position of Imperial Oberststallmeister at court, in 1912 he received the Grand Cross of the Order of Leopold and finally he was awarded the Order of the Golden Fleece (1915).

=== Marriage and Children ===
In 1892, in Prague, he married Princess Aglaja Auersperg (1868–1919), daughter of the former Austrian Prime Minister Prince Adolf of Auersperg (1821–1885). Seven children came from their marriage. Three daughters married descendants of old noble families and important landowners in Bohemia (Buquoy, Waldstein and Trauttmansdorff). His eldest son Ulrich, 10th Prince Kinsky of Wchinitz and Tettau inherited the princely title and estates in northern and eastern Bohemia from his uncle Rudolf, who had 5 daughters, but no son.

== Sources ==
- World History
