= Kinský Palace =

Kinský Palace may refer to:

- Kinský Palace (Prague), Czech Republic
- Palais Kinsky, Vienna, Austria
