= Franz Ulrich, 11th Prince Kinsky of Wchinitz and Tettau =

Franz Ulrich
- Prince Kinsky of Wchinitz and Tettau
- Born: 7 October 1936; Vienna, Federal State of Austria
- Died: 2 April 2009 (aged 72); Buenos Aires, Argentina
- Spouse: Roberta Cavanagh (m. 1965; div. 1977) Countess Helena Victoria Hutten-Czapska (m. 1977)
- Issue: Karl, 12th Prince Kinsky of Wchinitz and Tettau
Names
- Franz Ulrich Johannes Clemens Christophorus Antonius Bonaventura Maria
- House: Kinsky
- Father: Ulrich, 10th Prince Kinsky of Wchinitz and Tettau
- Mother: Baroness Marie Julia Mathilde von dem Bussche-Haddenhausen

Franz Ulrich, 11th Prince Kinsky of Wchinitz and Tettau (German: Franz Ulrich Johannes Clemens Christophorus Antonius Bonaventura Maria Fürst Kinsky von Wchinitz und Tettau; 7 October 1936 – 2 April 2009) was the titular Prince Kinsky of Wchinitz and Tettau as well the head of an ancient House of Kinsky.

== Early life ==
Franz Ulrich was born at Vienna, Federal State of Austria, as the youngest son of Ulrich, 10th Prince Kinsky of Wchinitz and Tettau by his second marriage to Baroness Marie Julia Mathilde von dem Bussche-Haddenhausen (1900–1974), the eldest daughter of Baron Hilmar von dem Bussche-Haddenhausen. His father was previously married to Countess Katalin Széchényi de Sárvár-Felsövidek (1893–1968), with whom he had three children. They divorced in 1930. Franz Ulrich became the titular Prince upon the death of his father in 1938. He was first cousin of Countess Marie Aglaë Kinsky of Wchinitz and Tettau who later became Princess consort of Liechtenstein, and second cousin of Claus von Amsberg, Prince consort of Queen Beatrix of the Netherlands, both descendants of Baron Julius von dem Bussche-Haddenhausen.

In 1940, he emigrated with his mother to Argentina where he lived until his death. In 1942, Franz Ulrich inherited several estates from the Kinsky family, including the Kinsky Palace in Old Town Square in Prague. These properties were withdrawn from him in 1945 on the basis of the Beneš decrees. Starting in 2003, Franz Ulrich complained against various Czech courts for the return of the assets. In total there were 157 lawsuits filed in the dispute of €1.3 billion. The European Court of Human Rights held that his right to a fair trial (article 6 § 1 of the Convention) had been violated.

== Marriage and family ==
Franz Ulrich married on 14 April 1965 in Buenos Aires to Roberta Cavanagh (1942–2002), daughter of Roberto Cavanagh and his wife, Anne Rowell. The divorced on 25 April 1977.

They had one son:

- Karl, 12th Prince Kinsky of Wchinitz and Tettau (born 10 January 1967), married in 2000 to Maria de las Dolores Beccar Varela (b. 1971); had issue.

He married secondly on 24 October 1977 in Paris to Countess Helena Victoria Hutten-Czapska (1941–2012), the only daughter of Count Stanislaus Hutten-Czapski (1898–1959) and his wife, Verena Narkiewicz-Jodko (1909–1992). They had no issue.

After Kinsky's death, his son and his widow, Countess Helena Victoria Hutten-Czapska entered a legal dispute over Kinsky's properties. The Civil Judge Nº 103 was in charge of the claims.

== Later life ==
The Prince died on 2 April 2009, aged 72. In 2012, some of his jewel collection was auctioned by Sothebys.

== Ancestry ==
Ancestors of Franz Ulrich, 11th Prince Kinsky of Wchinitz and Tettau

8. Ferdinand Bonaventura, 7th Prince Kinsky of Wchinitz and Tettau
4. Count Ferdinand Kinsky of Wchinitz and Tettau
9. Princess Maria of Liechtenstein
2. Ulrich, 10th Prince Kinsky of Wchinitz and Tettau
10. Prince Adolf of Auersperg
5. Princess Aglaë of Auersperg
11. Countess Johanna Festetics von Tolna
1. Franz Ulrich, 11th Prince Kinsky of Wchinitz and Tettau
12. Baron Julius von dem Bussche-Haddenhausen
6. Baron Hilmar von dem Bussche-Haddenhausen
13. Mathilde von Salviati
3. Baroness Marie von dem Bussche-Haddenhausen
14. Federico Martínez de Hoz Fernández de Agüero
7. Maria Eleonore Martinez de Hoz Stegmann
15. Juana Francisca Stegmann Pérez Millán

== Notes and sources ==
- Genealogisches Handbuch des Adels, Fürstliche Häuser, Reference: 1984 450

Franz Ulrich, 11th Prince Kinsky of Wchinitz and Tettau House of Kinsky Born: 7 October 1936 Died: 2 April 2009
Titles in pretence
Preceded by Ulrich	— TITULAR — Prince Kinsky of Wchinitz and Tettau; 19 December 1938 – 2 April 2009; Reason for succession failure: Austrian nobility titles abolished	Succeeded by Karl
