= Kinsky =

European noble family

Kinsky von Wchinitz und Tettau
- Arms of the House of Kinsky
- Country: Bohemia; Holy Roman Empire; Austrian Empire; Austro-Hungarian empire
- Founded: 1237; 789 years ago
- Current head: Karl, 12th Prince Kinsky of Wchinitz and Tettau
- Titles: Imperial Counts; Princes of the Holy Roman Empire (honorary, one branch); Austro-Hungarian Princes

The House of Kinsky (formerly Vchynští, sg. Vchynský in Czech; later (in modern Czech) Kinští, sg. Kinský; German: Kinsky von Wchinitz und Tettau) is a prominent European noble family originating in the Kingdom of Bohemia. During the Thirty Years' War, the Kinsky family rose from minor nobles to comital rank (1628) and later princely status (1747) under the rule of the Habsburgs. The family, recorded in the Almanach de Gotha, is considered to have been one of the most illustrious in the Austro-Hungarian Empire.

== Rise ==
The first factual mention of an ancestor of this clan dates back to 1237, during the reign of the Přemyslid king Wenceslaus I of Bohemia. Over the next three centuries they were only minor nobles with estates in northwestern Bohemia, around the village of Vchynice (German: Wchinitz) near Litoměřice. Holding of Vchynice manor was confirmed by the Habsburg emperor Rudolf II in 1596 and in 1611 one of the family's members, Radslav Vchynský of Vchynice the Elder, ennobled as lord (Czech: pán), became a member of the Diet of Bohemia (zemský sněm).

The rise of the family to prominence began in the turbulent era of religious conflicts between Catholics and Protestants which finally led to the cataclysm for Bohemia in the Thirty Years' War: Radslav's nephew, the royal official Vilém Kinský, took part in the Protestant revolt against Emperor Ferdinand II, which culminated in the 1618 Defenestration of Prague. Vilém was among the nobles who, without success, offered the Bohemian crown to the Wettin elector John George I of Saxony. After the loss of Czech independence in 1620 (Battle of White Mountain), when the majority of local Protestant aristocracy was banished and their possessions expropriated in favour of nobility faithful to the Catholic House of Habsburg, he retained his possessions and was even elevated to the rank of a Count (Graf) in 1628. Through his marriage with Alžběta (Elisabeth) Trčka of Lípa, he was a brother-in-law of the Imperial generalissimo Albrecht von Wallenstein, with whom he was assassinated at Cheb in 1634.

A branch of the family was elevated to Princes of the Holy Roman Empire by Empress Maria Theresa in 1747. Many members of the family served in high diplomatic or military positions in the Habsburg monarchy and subsequently in the Austrian Empire.

== Confiscation and restoration ==
After World War II, estates of the princely (Choceň) branch of the family were confiscated under the Decree of the President of Republic, as the late Prince Ulrich (1893–1938) was reproached for his declared German nationality and active collaboration with the Sudeten German Party. Estates of the other branches, Kostelec and Chlumec, which had been confiscated by the Nazis during the German occupation, were returned after 1945 but confiscated again, this time by the ruling Communist Party in 1948. After the Velvet Revolution and the fall of Communism, several possessions – for example, Karlova Koruna Chateau and Kost Castle – were returned to the family.

From 2003, the senior member of the princely branch, Prince Ulrich's son Franz Ulrich, sued the Czech Republic for return of the properties confiscated in 1945 only because, he maintained, the confiscation implicitly labeled his family as historical traitors against Czechoslovakia and as willful collaborators during the Nazi occupation. The Kinsky family has denied such charges, arguing that Prince Franz Ulrich was just two years old at the time of his father's death and that he and his mother, Princess Kinsky (née Baroness Mathilde von dem Bussche-Haddenhausen — whose family reputedly plotted against Hitler), had left the occupied country and went into exile in Argentina shortly afterwards.

According to a 2005 judgement by the Constitutional Court of the Czech Republic, at least the expropriations enacted before the Communist coup d'état (1948) are valid. Prince Franz Ulrich died in 2009 in Buenos Aires after a brief illness and was survived by his widow, née Countess Lena Hutten-Czapska. He left as heir to his title, properties and pending claims against the Czech state, his son Karl ("Charlie") and three grandchildren.

== Notable members ==
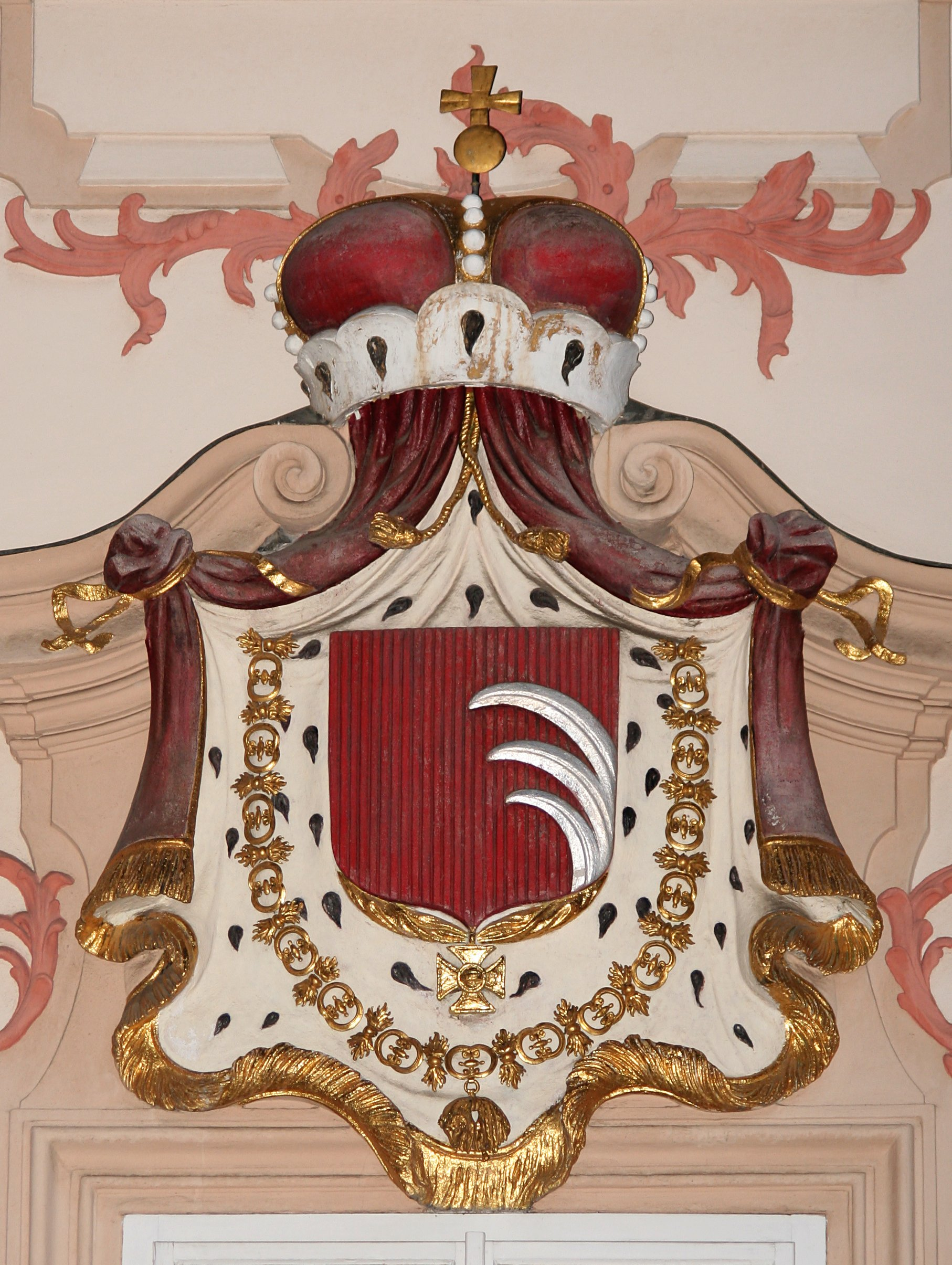
Princely Arms of the Kinsky family at Kinsky Palace in Old Town Square, Prague

=== Heads of the princely family ===
- Wenceslaus, Count 1687–1719 (1642–1719)
  - Stephan Wilhelm, 1st Prince 1747–1749 (1679–1749), fourth surviving son
    - Philip Franz Joseph, 2nd Prince 1749–1752 (1726–1752)
  - Count Philipp-Joseph Franz (1700–1749), fifth surviving son
    - Franz de Paula Ulrich, 3rd Prince 1752–1792 (1726–1792)
      - Joseph, 4th Prince 1792–1798 (1751–1798)
        - Ferdinand, 5th Prince 1798–1812 (1781–1812)
          - Rudolf, 6th Prince 1812–1836 (1802–1836)
            - Ferdinand Bonaventura, 7th Prince 1836–1904 (1834–1904)
              - Karl, 8th Prince 1904–1919 (1858–1919)
              - Rudolf, 9th Prince 1919–1930 (1859–1930)
              - Count Ferdinand Vincent (1866–1916)
                - Ulrich, 10th Prince 1930–1938 (1892–1938)
                  - Franz Ulrich, 11th Prince 1938–2009 (1936–2009)
                    - Karl, 12th Prince 2009–present (born 1967)
                      - Count Wenzel Ferdinand (born 2002)
                      - Count Maximilian Benedikt (born 2006)
                      - Count Stephan Wilhelm (born 2008)
                - two younger sons with male heirs surviving

=== Distinguished relatives ===
- Francis, Count of Kinsky of Wchinitz and Tettau (1634–1699), High Chancellor of Bohemia
- Francis Ferdinand, Count of Kinsky (1678–1741), Bohemian chancellor
- Philip Kinsky of Wchinitz and Tettau (1700–1749), Bohemian chancellor
- Joseph, Count Kinsky (1731–1804), Field Marshal in Imperial service
- Franz Joseph, Count Kinsky (1739–1805), Imperial General in the French Revolutionary Wars.
- Countess Franziska Kinsky of Wchinitz and Tettau (1813–1881), princess consort of Liechtenstein
- Bertha von Suttner (1843–1914), née Countess Kinsky of Wchinitz and Tettau, pacifist
- Sophie, Duchess of Hohenberg (1868–1914), wife of Franz Ferdinard
- Countess Marie Kinsky of Wchinitz and Tettau (1940–2021), princess consort of Liechtenstein

== Residences ==
Like many of the aristocratic families of the Habsburg monarchy, the Kinskys were great landowners and patrons of the arts. They employed (between 1713 and 1716) the celebrated architect Johann Lukas von Hildebrandt to build their residence Palais Kinsky in Vienna, which remained in the family's ownership until 1987. In addition to this home, from the 18th century the family also owned the vast baroque Kinsky Palace in Old Town Square, Prague. Another family home was Choceň Chateau, a medieval Bohemian fortress rebuilt in the neo-Gothic style in the 19th century. All of these homes were filled with priceless treasures and artifacts. The family lost most of its property in 1945 by confiscation in Czechoslovakia, but after 1990, Karlova Koruna Chateau and Kost Castle were restituted to the family. The Kinskys also own Burg Heidenreichstein in Lower Austria, which they inherited.

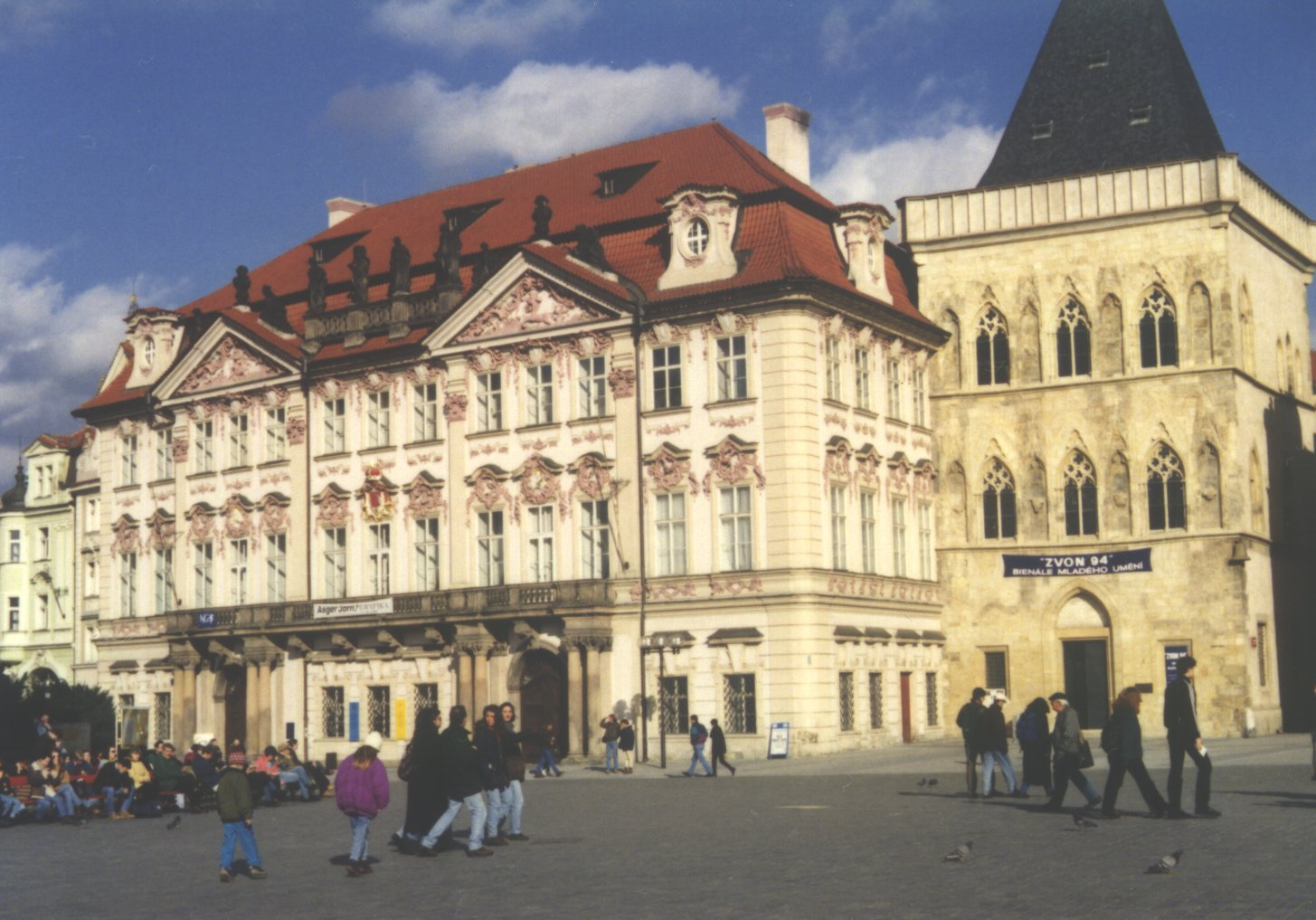
Kinsky Palace, Prague

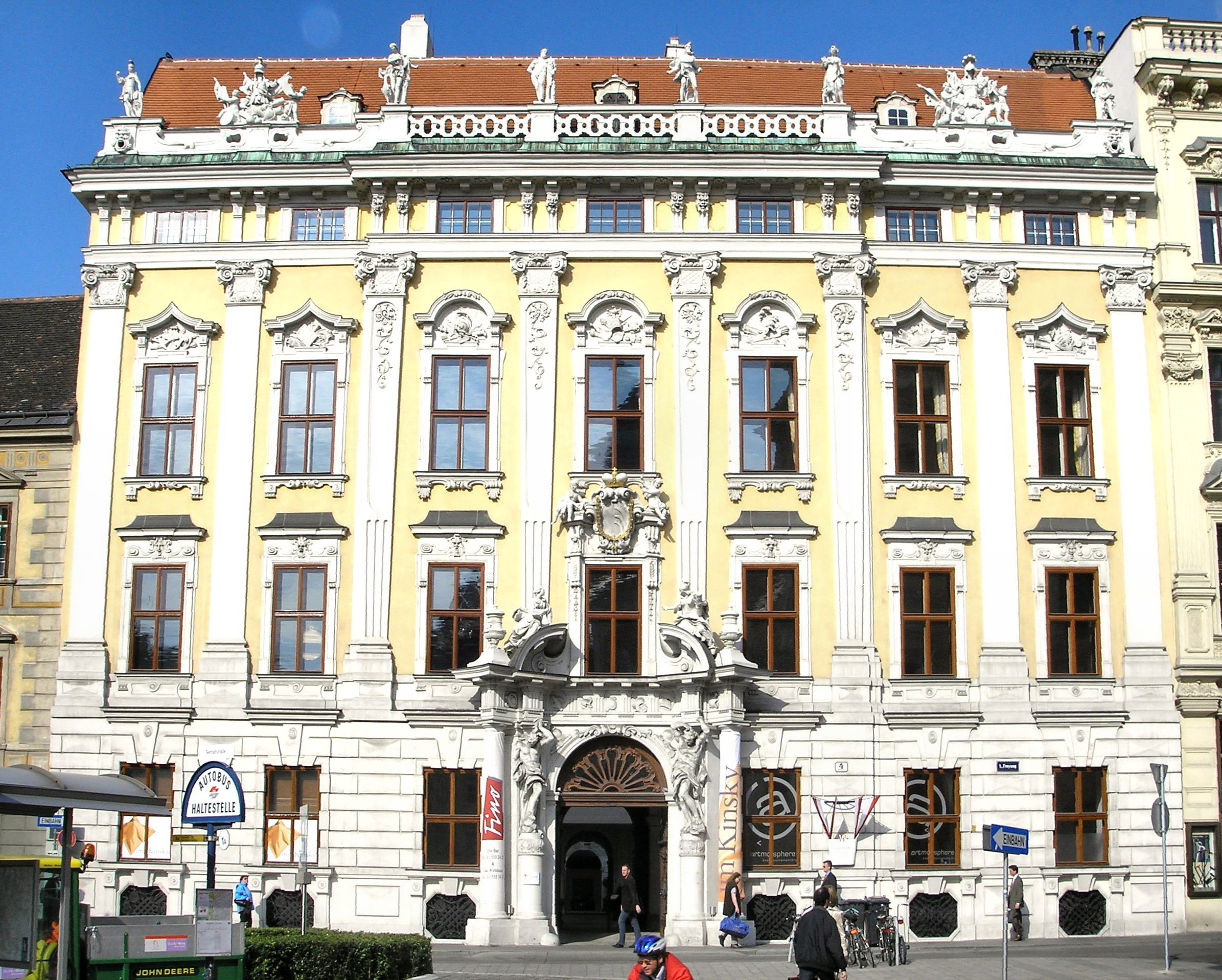
Palais Kinsky, Vienna

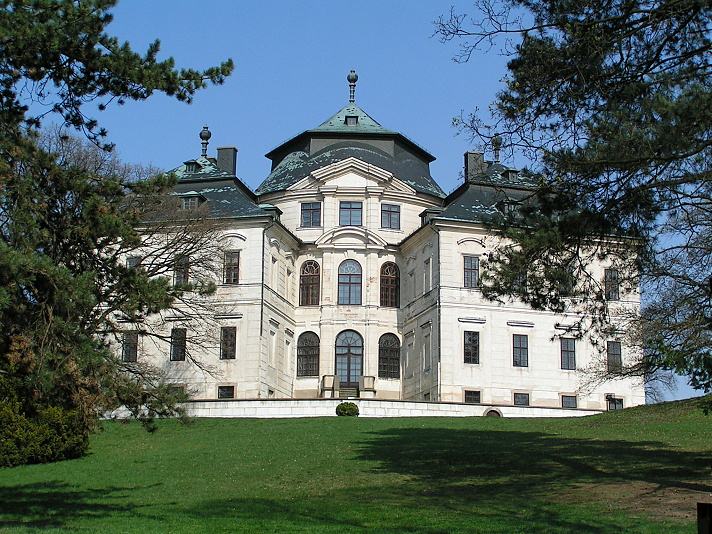
Karlova Koruna Chateau, Bohemia

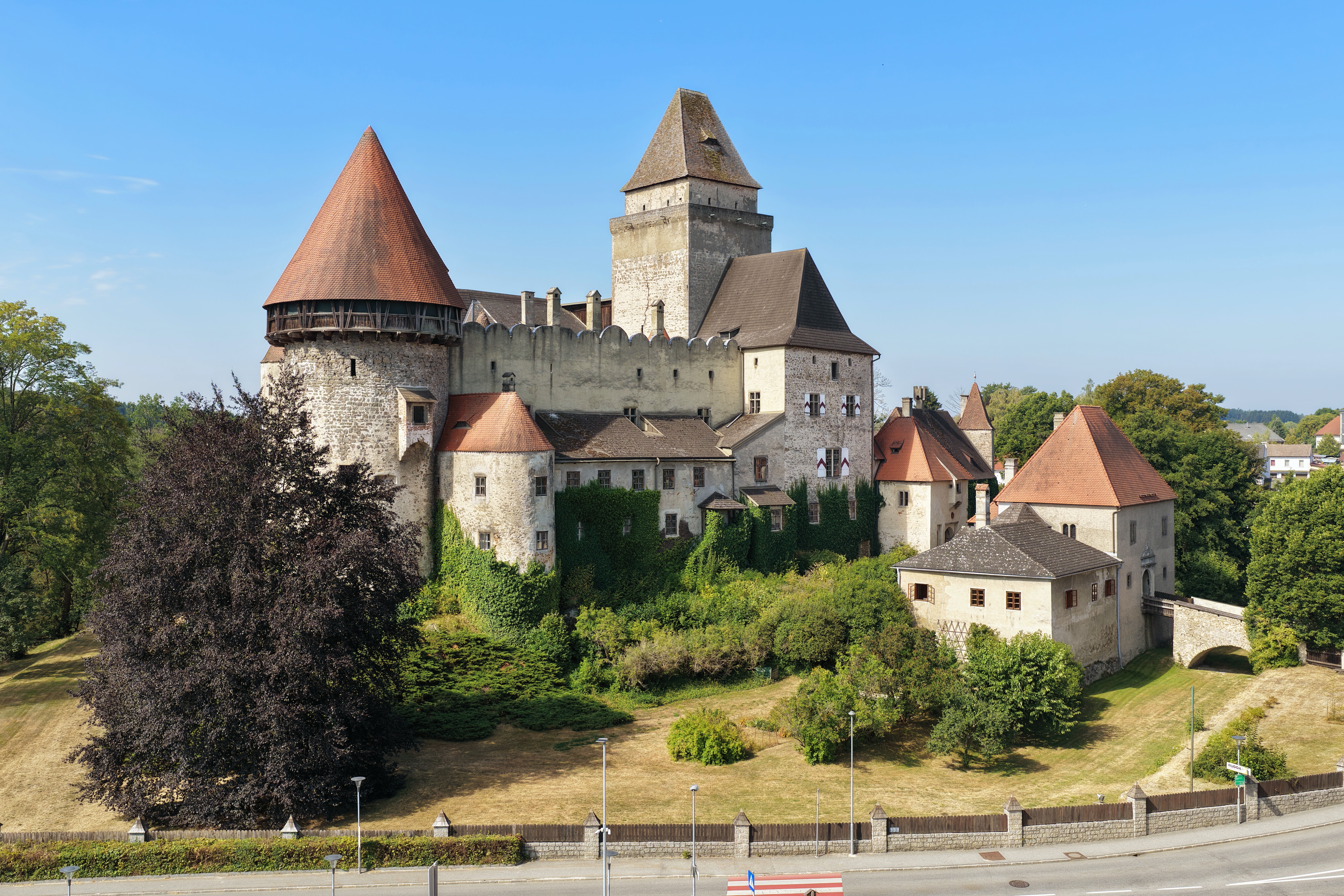
Burg Heidenreichstein, Lower Austria

== Support of Beethoven ==
As a patron of the arts, along with Archduke Rudolf and Prince Joseph Lobkowitz, Ferdinand Kinsky contributed 1,800 fl. to a yearly salary of 4,000 florin for Ludwig van Beethoven. Ferdinand arranged his share to be paid on as a pension until Beethoven died in March 1827.

== Stud farms ==
In 1723, Emperor Charles VI ordered the Kinsky family to develop their stud farms and breed horses of such quality as to provide superior mounts for the officers of the elite cavalry regiments of the empire. In 1776, the quality of the Kinsky horses was further improved by bloodstock from England.

In 1838, Count Oktavian Kinsky expanded still further the Kinsky studs, famous throughout Europe for their high equine quality, known as the Kinsky horse.

== See also ==
- Kinski (disambiguation)
- List of princes of Austria-Hungary

== Sources ==
- Brož, Ivan (1997). Velké postavy rodu Kinských [Great Figures of the Kinsky Family] (in Czech). Praha: Petrklíč. ISBN 80-7229-052-5.
- Richter, Karel (1995). Sága rodu Kinských [Saga of the Kinsky Family] (in Czech). Chlumec: [s.n.] OCLC 271612311.
- Valenta, Aleš (2004). Dějiny rodu Kinských [History of the Kinsky Family] (in Czech). Praha: Veduta. ISBN 80-86829-05-7.
