= Oktavian Kinsky =

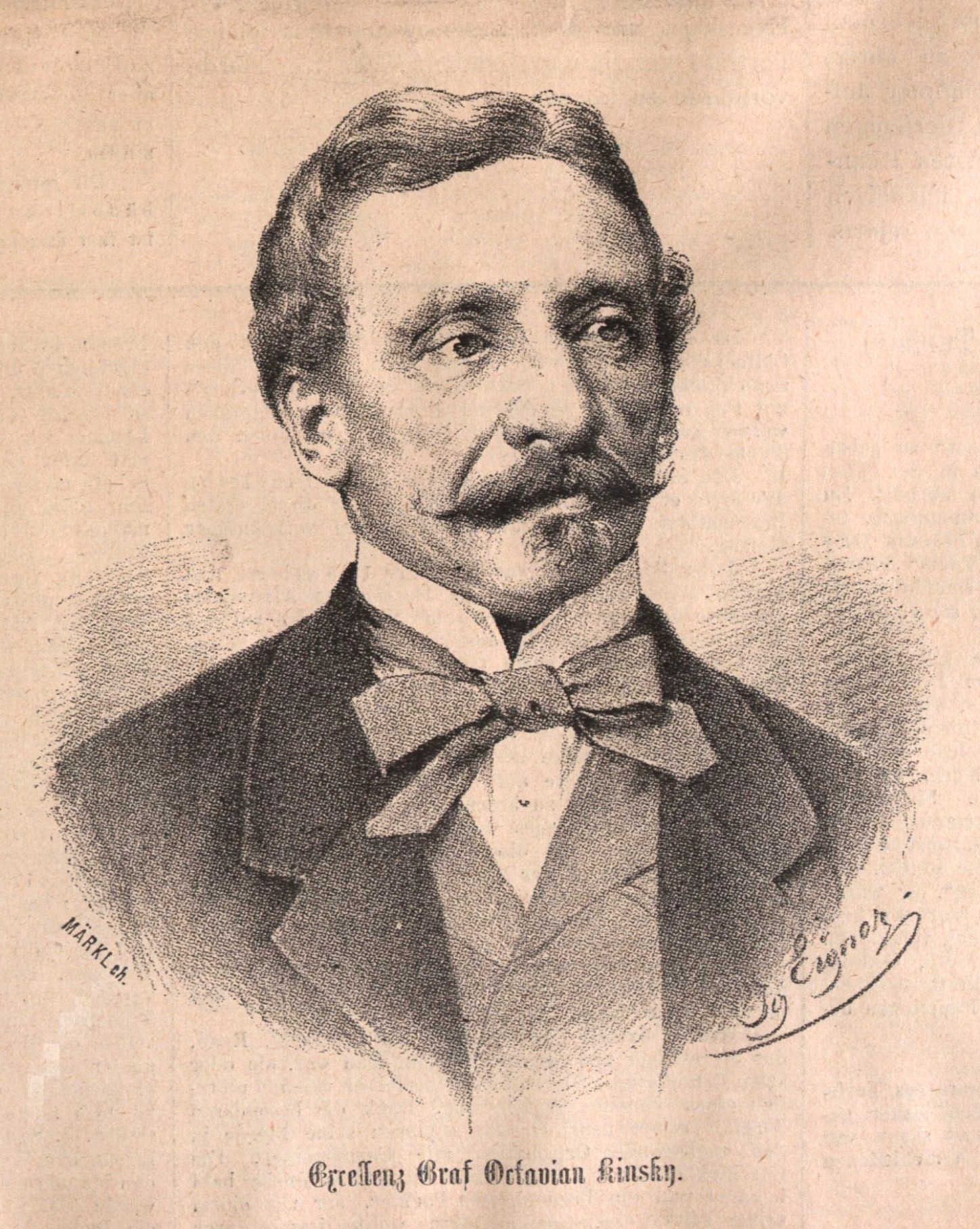
Octavian Kinsky by Ignaz Eigner, 1878

Count Oktavian Kinsky (1813–1896) was a member of the Kinsky dynasty and noted horse breeder. He married Agnes Schaffgotsch genannt Semperfrei von und zu Kynast und Greiffenstein (1810–1888). Recorded in the Almanach de Gotha, the couple were amongst the grandest elite of the Austro-Hungarian Empire. They had no children.

Kinsky was Bohemia's and Europe's most successful horse breeder. In 1834 he expanded the already renowned family stud farm in Eastern Bohemia. The gold-coloured horses he bred there were some of the finest in the world, and remained so until the mid 20th century.

The breeding programme of the Kinsky horse placed huge importance upon temperament, stamina and agility.

Later in his life Kinsky introduced European style fox hunting to Bohemia, and in 1846 he introduced English style point-to-point racing. Finally in 1874 he created a Grand National style race, known today as the Pardubice Grand National, Europe's most strenuous test of equine stamina.
