= Hilmar von dem Bussche-Haddenhausen =

German diplomat

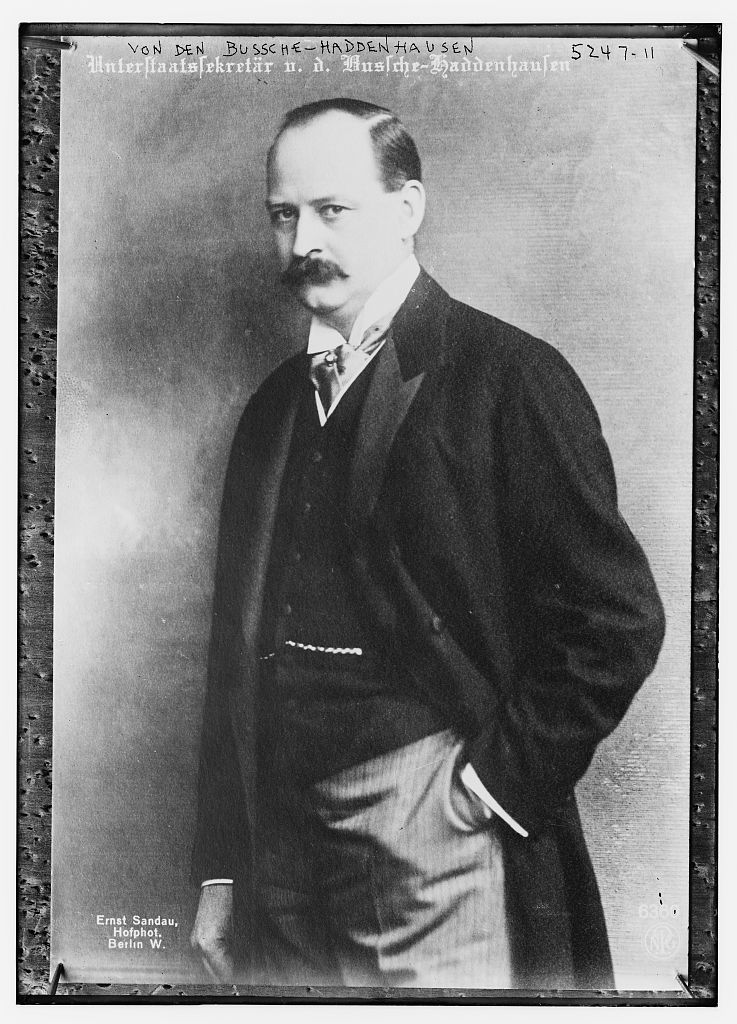
- Photograph of Baron von dem Bussche-Haddenhausen, between c. 1915 and c. 1920

German Ambassador to Romania
- In office 1914–1916
- Preceded by: Julius von Waldthausen
- Succeeded by: Hans Freytag (in 1921 as Envoy of the Weimar Republic)

German Ambassador to Argentina
- In office 1910–1914
- Preceded by: Julius von Waldthausen
- Succeeded by: Karl von Luxburg

Personal details
- Born: 31 January 1867; Hanover
- Died: 19 November 1939 (aged 72); Ramos Mejía, Argentina
- Spouse: María Eleonore Martínez de Hoz
- Relations: Franz Ulrich, 11th Prince Kinsky of Wchinitz and Tettau (grandson); Gösta von dem Bussche-Haddenhausen (niece)
- Children: 5
- Parent(s): Julius von dem Bussche-Haddenhausen; Mathilde von Salviati

Hilmar Freiherr von dem Bussche-Haddenhausen (31 January 1867 – 19 November 1939) was a German nobleman and a diplomat.

== Early life ==
Hilmar was born in Hanover on 31 January 1867, and belonged to the ancient von dem Bussche noble family which originated from the County of Ravensberg. He was a son of the deputy chief stable master Julius von dem Bussche-Haddenhausen (1827–1882) and his wife Mathilde von Salviati (1833–1892). His mother, the widow of Charles Frederick Rocheid of Inverleith (1831-1864), was a daughter of Peter Heinrich August von Salviati (1786-1856), the Prussian Ambassador to Spain. His younger brother, George von dem Bussche-Haddenhausen, was the mother of Baroness Gösta von dem Bussche-Haddenhausen (herself the mother of Prince Claus of the Netherlands, consort of Queen Beatrix of the Netherlands).

He was educated at the grammar school in Bückeburg, from which he completed his Abitur at Easter 1886. He then studied law at the Universities of Geneva, Leipzig and Berlin. After his exams, he began working in the Prussian judicial service. In the meantime, he received his juris doctor in 1890. Beginning in 1891, he took courses in Russian and Turkish at the Seminar for Oriental Languages in Berlin.

== Career ==
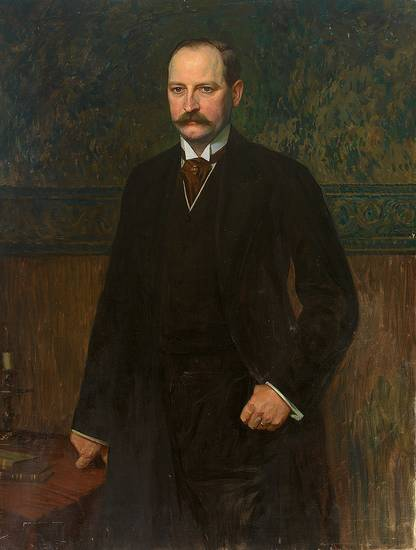
Portrait of Bussche-Haddenhausen by Heinrich Hellhoff

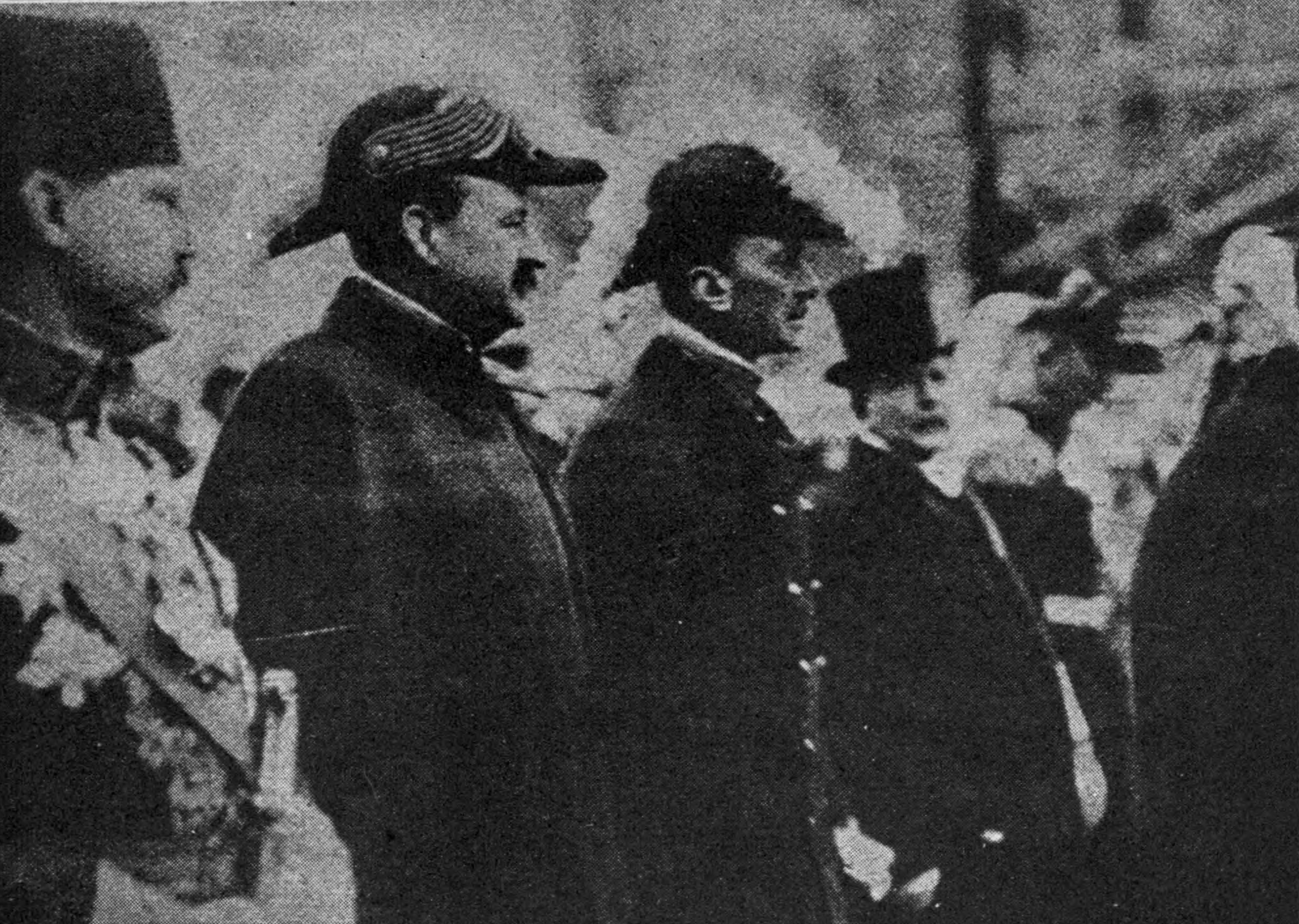
Monteforti (chargé d'affaires of Persia), Baron von dem Bussche-Haddenhausen, Count Ottokar Czernin (Austro-Hungarian Minister) and Charles J. Vopicka (American Minister) at the funeral of Queen Elisabeth of Romania, 1916.

In 1894, Bussche-Haddenhausen was appointed to the Foreign Office and began his diplomatic career. In May 1895, he was appointed as legation secretary to the German embassy in Tangier, replacing the incumbent envoy Christian von Tattenbach, before becoming chargé d'affaires in August 1895. In May 1896, Bussche-Haddenhausen was appointed legation councilor before he was recalled from Tangier in November.

He then began to organize preparations for Argentina, arriving in Buenos Aires at the beginning of 1897, taking a position at the German embassy there. He replaced Friedrich von Mentzingen as chargé d'affaires the following year on 1 July 1898. He left Argentina a year later and was assigned to Egypt, working at the German embassy in Cairo on 26 February 1900 under chargé d'affaires Maximilian von Loehr. He stayed in Cairo for two years becoming legation councilor in October 1902 before moving to the German embassy in London on 30 October 1902. He served in London as Second Secretary of the Embassy under Ambassador Paul Wolff von Metternich. His assignment was brief as he was assigned to the German embassy in Washington, D.C. on 2 July 1903 as First Secretary of the embassy under Ambassador Hermann Speck von Sternburg before becoming embassy counselor the following year. Bussche-Haddenhausen's served in Washington until May 1906, when he returned to the Foreign Office in Berlin in the Politics Department working, primarily, as a department head for English affairs. Shortly before his return to Argentina where he replaced Julius von Waldthausen, he became a Privy Legation Councilor on 17 May 1909. At the beginning of 1910, he returned to Buenos Aires as Envoy also responsible for the tasks in Paraguay. He served in that role for four years, until his mission ended shortly before the outbreak of World War I.

Bussche-Haddenhausen took over as acting head of the German embassy in Bucharest on 18 September 1914, again succeeding Julius von Waldthausen, who retired. In December 1915, Bussche-Haddenhausen was appointed Envoy but had to return to Germany at short notice in the summer of 1916 because of the unexpected break in diplomatic relations with Romania. When he arrived, he was put into temporary retirement in September, but was deployed again at the Foreign Office in Berlin in November 1916, focusing on various departments, including Politics, Trade Policy, Law, Intelligence, and the Central Office for Foreign Service. On 27 January 1918, he was awarded the title of Real Privy Councilor with the title of "Excellence". As a result of the collapse of the Empire and the dissolution of state institutions, his assignment at the Foreign Office in Berlin ended on 1 January 1919.

=== Later life ===
In August 1919, he was reported to have said that "the indemnities provided for in the Peace Treaty will never be collected, because they are so ridiculous and high that the League of Nations will eventually annul or reduce them. He declare[ed] that it [was] only a matter of time until Germany will regain 'her old place of supremacy.'" In the beginning of the Weimar Republic, Bussche-Haddenhausen withdrew from public life. By 1928, however, he held the office of chairman of the Verein für Deutsche Kulturbeziehungen im Ausland (Association for German Cultural Relations Abroad), serving until 1931. He retired in February 1932. In 1936, he purchased the Mecklenburg estate Katelbogen in northern Germany.

== Personal life ==
On 15 August 1899 in Buenos Aires, Bussche-Haddenhausen married María Eleonore Martínez de Hoz (1875–1957), the daughter of Argentinian landowner Narciso Martínez de Hoz, who was from one of the richest families in Argentina, and Mathilde Stegmann. His wife's first cousin twice removed was Argentina's Minister of Economy José Alfredo Martínez de Hoz. Together, they had five children, including:

- Mathilde Marie von dem Bussche-Haddenhausen (1900–1974), who married Walther Mumm von Schwarzenstein in 1924. They divorced in 1928, and she married Ulrich, 10th Prince Kinsky of Wchinitz and Tettau in 1932.
- Carl von dem Bussche-Haddenhausen (1901–1960), a banker who married American Josephine Timberlake in 1934.
- Kurt von dem Bussche-Haddenhausen (b. 1905)
- Else von dem Bussche-Haddenhausen (1914–1969), who married Wilfried, Edler von Rienzburg in 1939. They divorced and she married diplomat Max Löwenthal-Chlumecky in 1941.
- Hans Ernst von dem Bussche-Haddenhausen (1916–1981), who married Maria Kurthy in 1941.

Baron von dem Bussche-Haddenhausen died on 19 November 1939 in Ramos Mejía, Argentina.

=== Descendants ===
Through his eldest daughter, he was a grandfather of Franz Ulrich, 11th Prince Kinsky of Wchinitz and Tettau (1936–2009).
