= Vchynice =

- Municipality
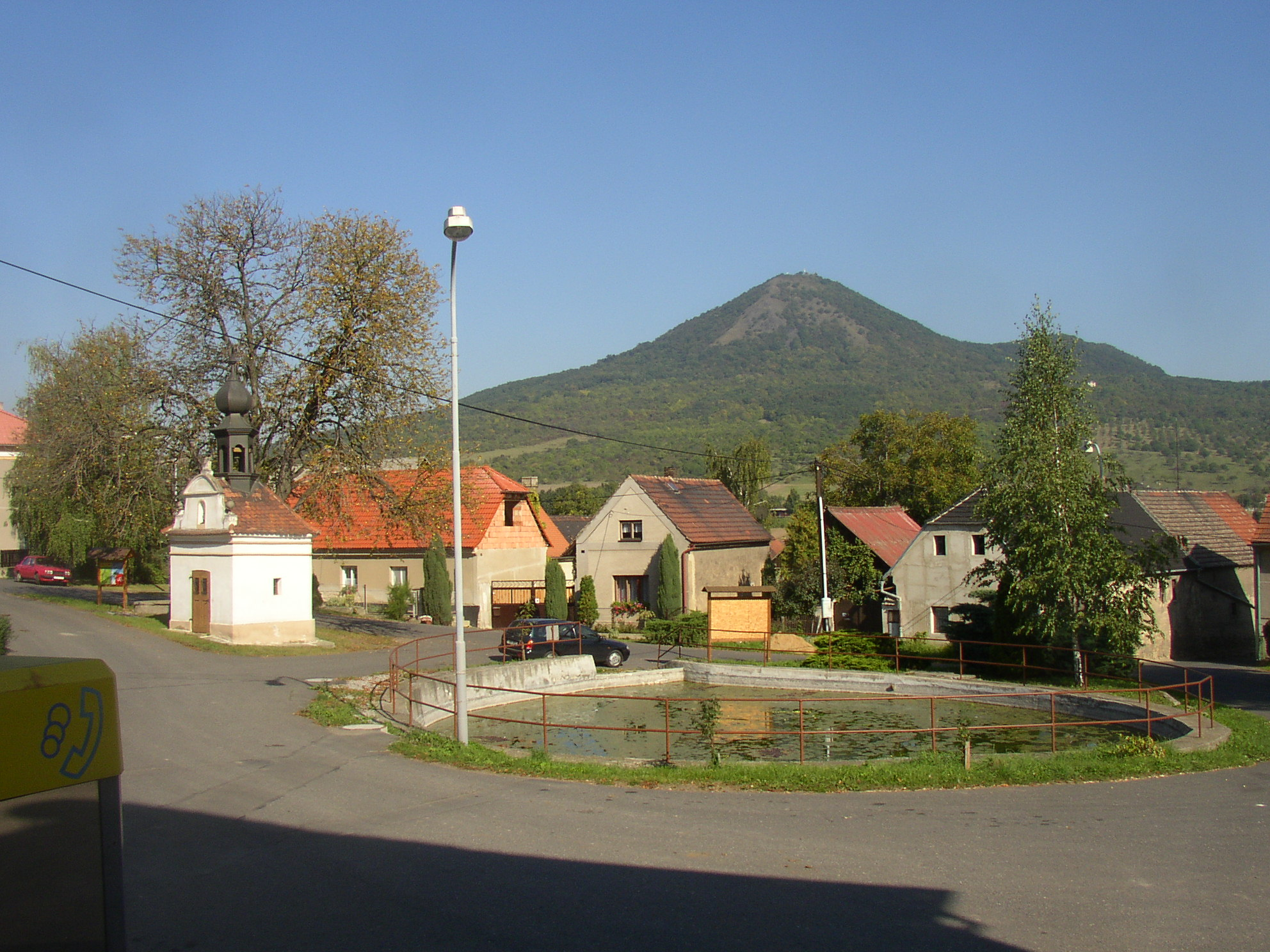
- Centre of Vchynice

- Flag Coat of arms

- Location in the Czech Republic
- Coordinates: 50°30′38″N 14°1′13″E
- Country: Czech Republic
- Region: Ústí nad Labem
- District: Litoměřice
- First mentioned: 1293

Area
  - Total: 5.21 km^{2} (2.01 sq mi)
- Elevation: 204 m (669 ft)

Population (2026-01-01)
  - Total: 307
  - Density: 58.9/km^{2} (153/sq mi)
- Time zone: UTC+1 (CET)
  - Summer (DST): UTC+2 (CEST)
- Postal code: 410 02
- Website: www.vchynice.cz

Vchynice is a municipality and village in Litoměřice District in the Ústí nad Labem Region of the Czech Republic. It has about 300 inhabitants. The noble Kinsky family originates from Vchynice and derived its name from the name of the village.

== Administrative division ==
Vchynice consists of five municipal parts (in brackets population according to the 2021 census):

- Vchynice (229)
- Radostice (48)

== Etymology ==
According to the most probable theory, the initial name of the village was Chynice. The name was derived from the personal name Chýna, meaning "the village of Chýna's people", and then distorted to Vchynice from the phrase v Chynicích ('in Chynice'). There is also a theory that the name of the village was derived from Vchyna, but existence of such a personal name is not proven.

== Geography ==
Vchynice is located about 8 kilometres (5 mi) west of Litoměřice and 17 km (11 mi) south of Ústí nad Labem. Most of the municipal territory lies in the Central Bohemian Uplands, but the eastern part extends into the Lower Ohře Table. The highest point is the hill Ovčín at 431 m (1,414 ft) above sea level. The entire municipality lies in the České středohoří Protected Landscape Area.

== History ==
The first written mention of Vchynice is from 1293. Since time immemorial, the village was the property of a noble family that called itself Vchynický of Vchynice and Tetov. According to unverified reports, there was a knight named Vchyna in 1205 who had a fortress built here. The Vchynický family, later known as Vchynský family and then as Kinský (Anglicised and Germanised as Kinsky) family, gained additional property and respect in the 16th century and gradually became one of the most prominent Czech noble families.

== Demographics ==
Historical population

Year	Pop.	±%
1869	344	—
1880	374	+8.7%
1890	397	+6.1%
1900	478	+20.4%
1910	522	+9.2%

Year	Pop.	±%
1921	480	−8.0%
1930	464	−3.3%
1950	402	−13.4%
1961	426	+6.0%
1970	399	−6.3%

Year	Pop.	±%
1980	353	−11.5%
1991	294	−16.7%
2001	312	+6.1%
2011	293	−6.1%
2021	277	−5.5%

Source: Censuses

== Transport ==
The D8 motorway from Prague to Ústí nad Labem runs through the municipal territory.

== Sights ==
Among the protected cultural monuments in the municipality are a Baroque chapel from 1764, modified to its present form in 1908, and a late Baroque statue of Saint Wenceslaus created in 1761.
