= Burg Heidenreichstein =

Lowland castle in Austria

Coordinates: 48°51′52″N 15°07′18″E

- Lower Austria, Austria
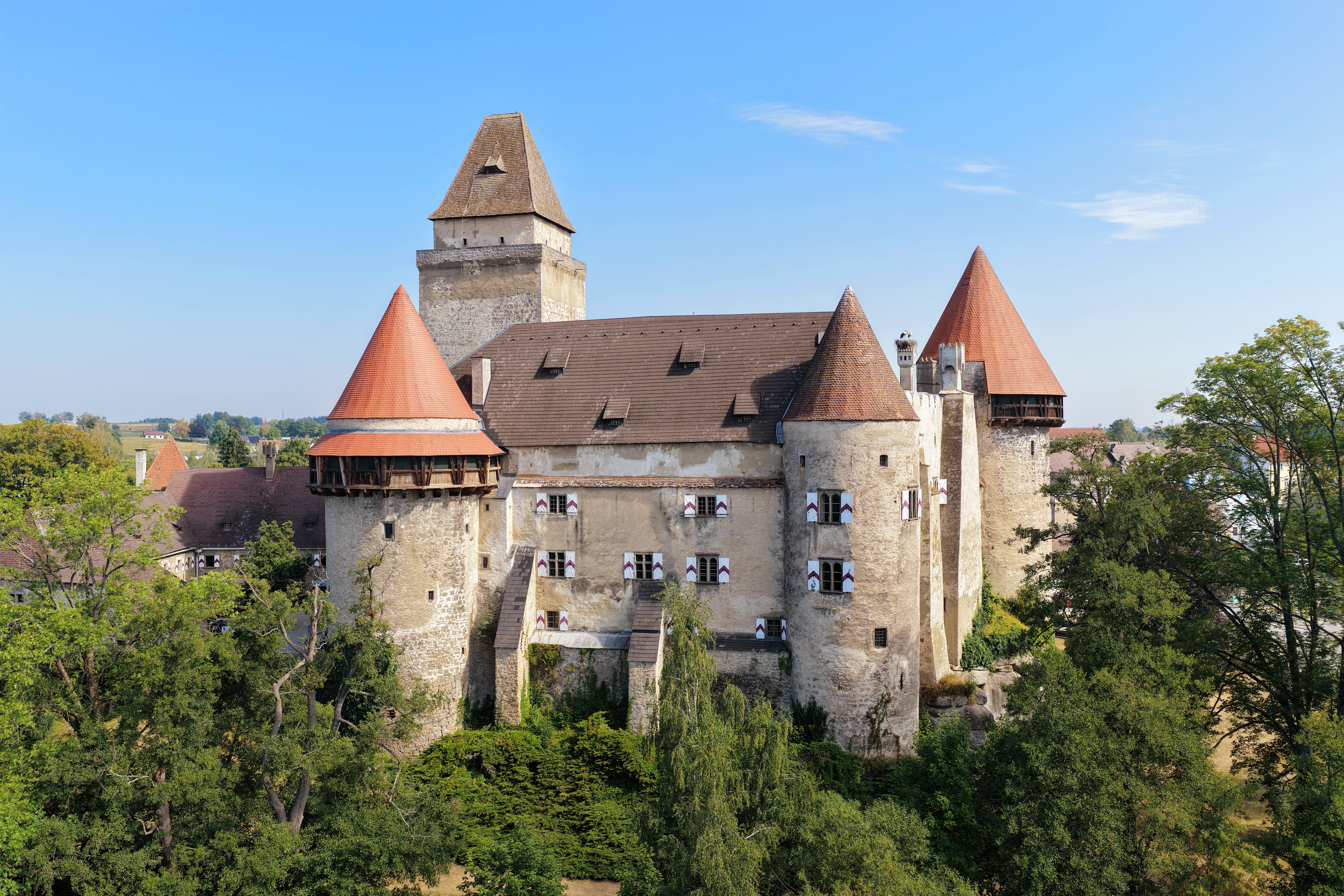
- South view of Heidenreichstein Castle

Site information
- Type: Castle

Burg Heidenreichstein is a castle in Lower Austria, Austria. Burg Heidenreichstein is 556 metres (1,824 ft) above sea level.

The oldest parts of the castle are dated back to the 12th century. The castle has recently been inherited by the House of Kinsky.

== See also ==
- List of castles in Austria
