= Palais Kinsky =

Baroque palace in Vienna, Austria

Coordinates: 48°12′42″N 16°21′50″E

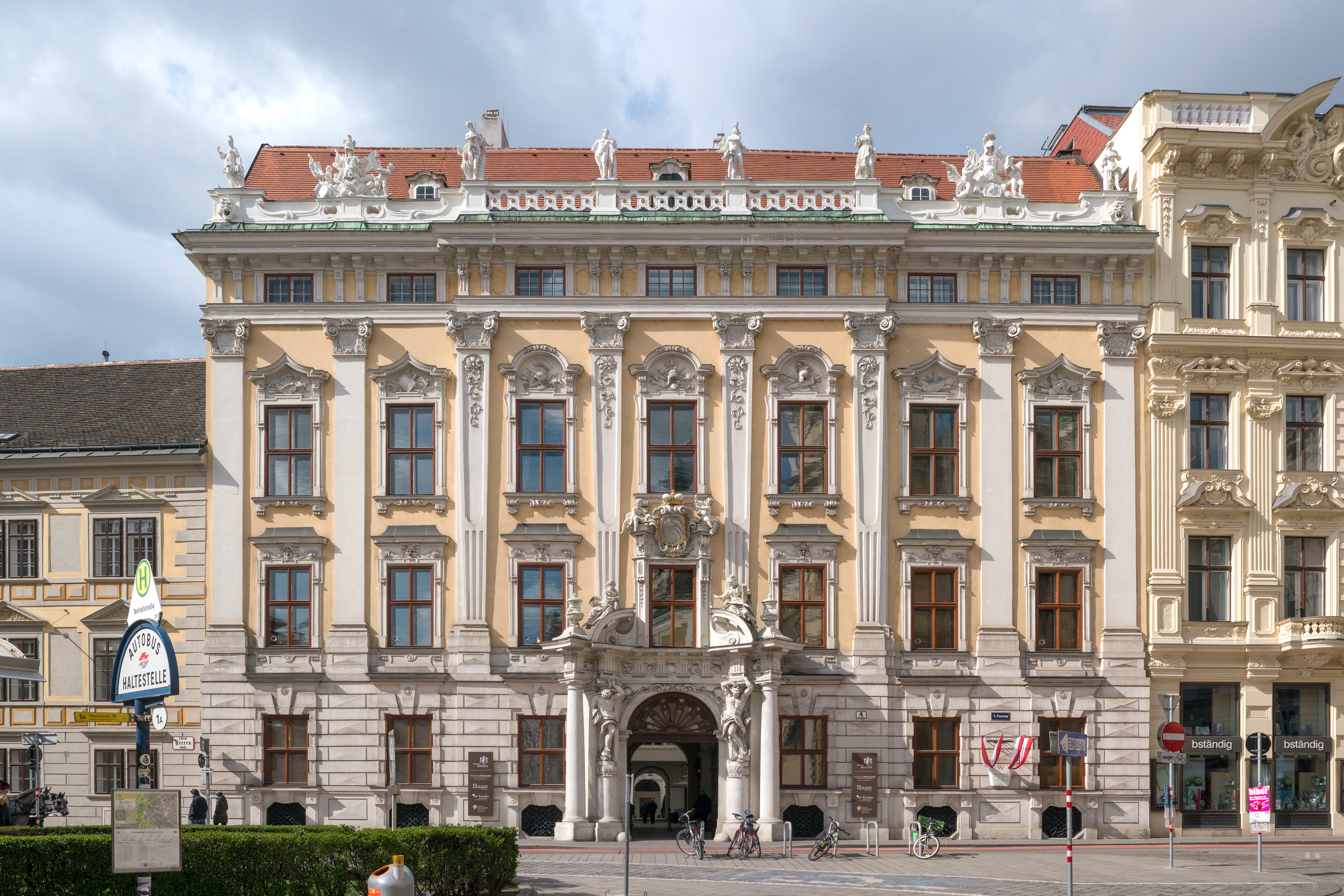
Palais Kinsky

Palais Kinsky is a Baroque palace in central Vienna, Austria. It was originally built for Count Wirich Philipp von Daun, the garrison commander whose son Leopold became a Field Marshal of Empress Maria Theresa. The palace was later bought by the Kinsky family of Bohemia, and it is sometimes called the Palais Daun-Kinsky.

== History ==
The palace was commissioned by Count Wirich Philipp von Daun, and construction started in 1713 under the direction of architect Johann Lucas von Hildebrandt. Prince Józef Poniatowski, a Polish general and Marshal of France, was born in the palace on 7 May 1763.

The palace has a yellow and white façade, and a richly decorated staircase with frescoed ceilings, mirrors and statues. In 1784, it was sold to the noble Kinsky family. Matilde Kinsky inherited the Palace and married the Argentine Martinez de Hoz. The Palais became the Argentine embassy for a decade in the 1960s.

Palais Kinsky underwent renovation in the late 1990s and was restored to its earlier design. The rooms have Baroque frescoed ceilings and expensive parquet floors. The palace is used for auction events (Auktionshaus im Kinsky) and receptions, and it houses shops and a restaurant named Freyung 4. It was also used for the final-status negotiations between Serbian and Kosovo Albanians in EU-sponsored negotiations.

== Gallery ==
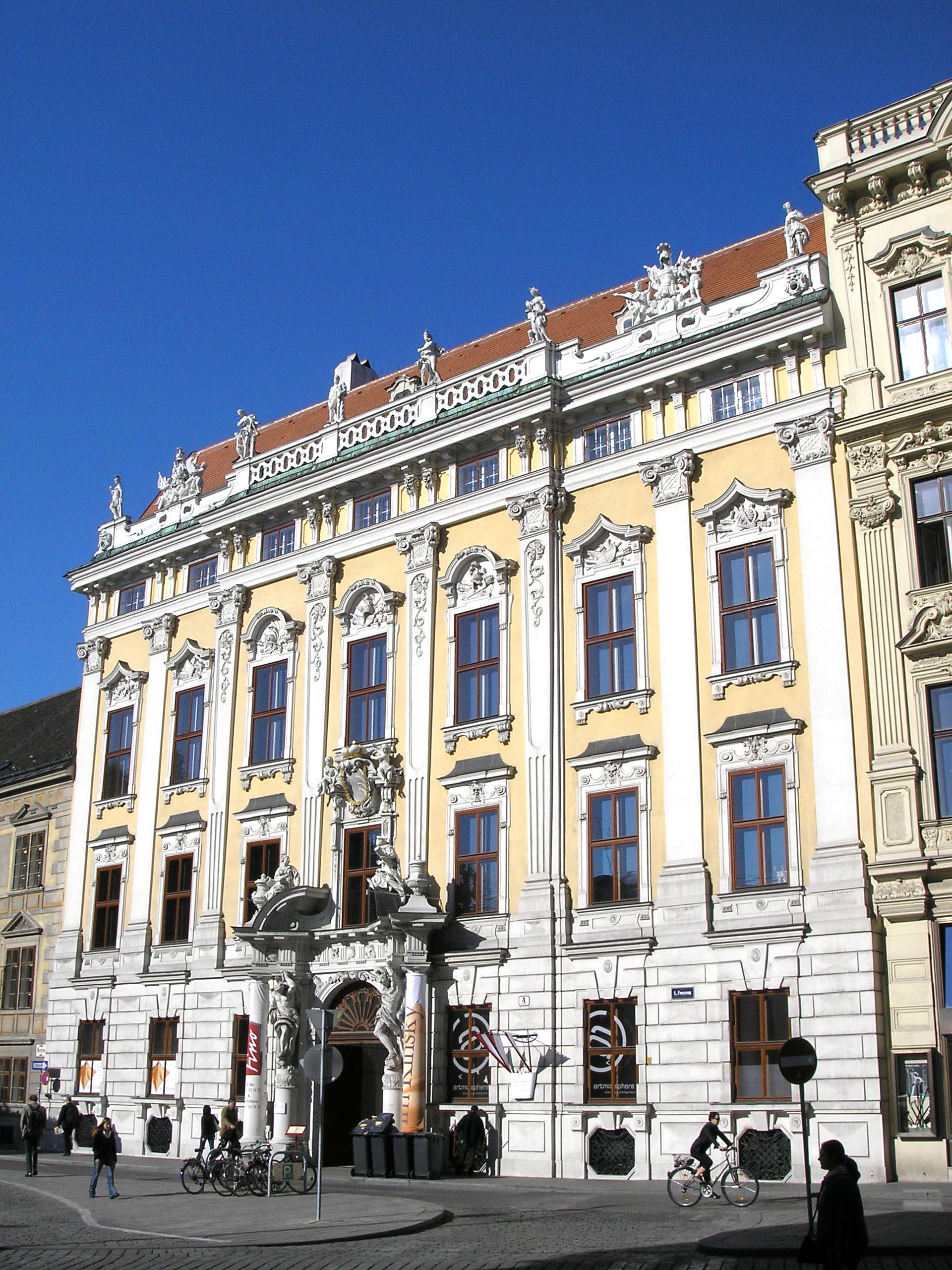
Palais Kinsky façade

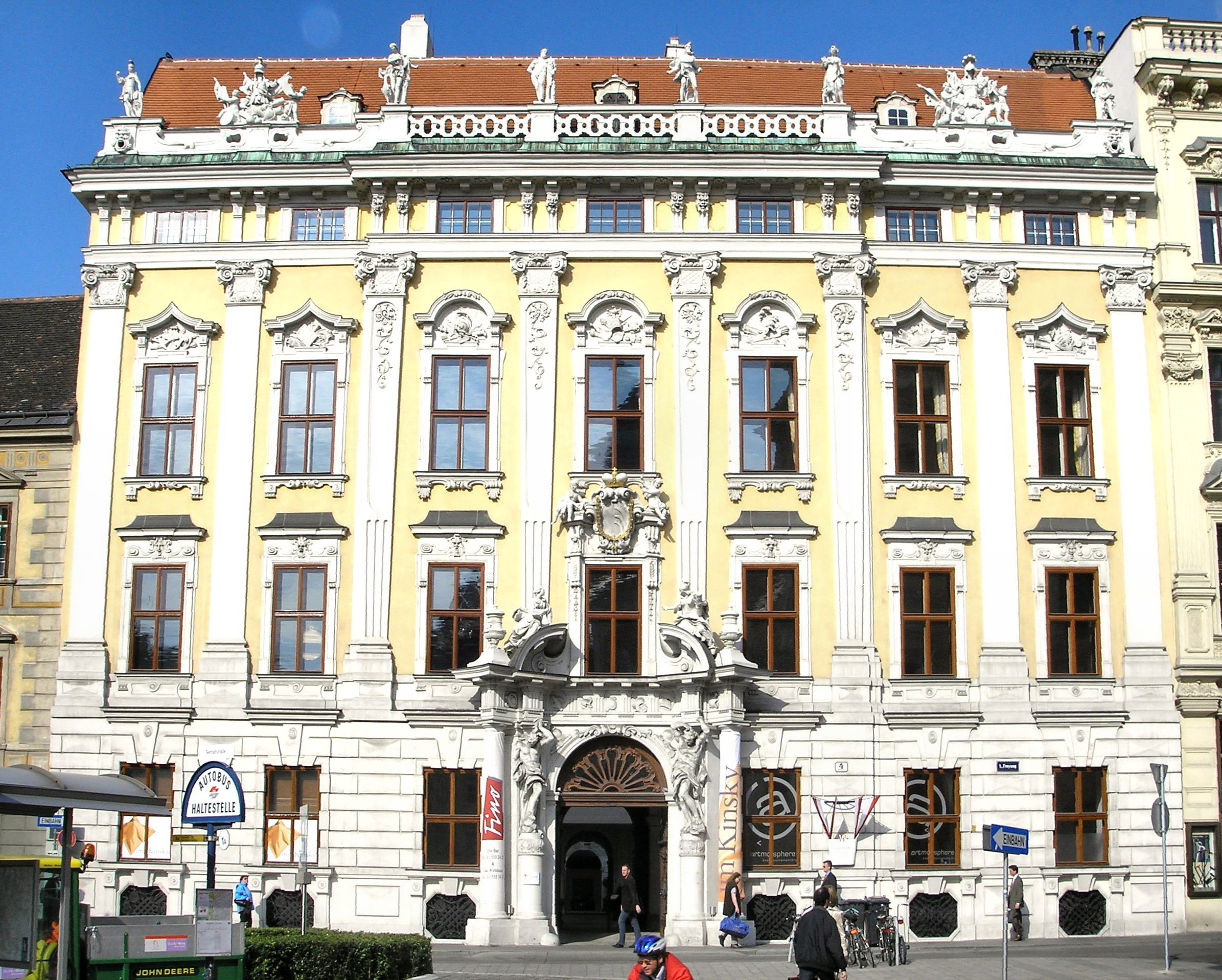
Front entrance

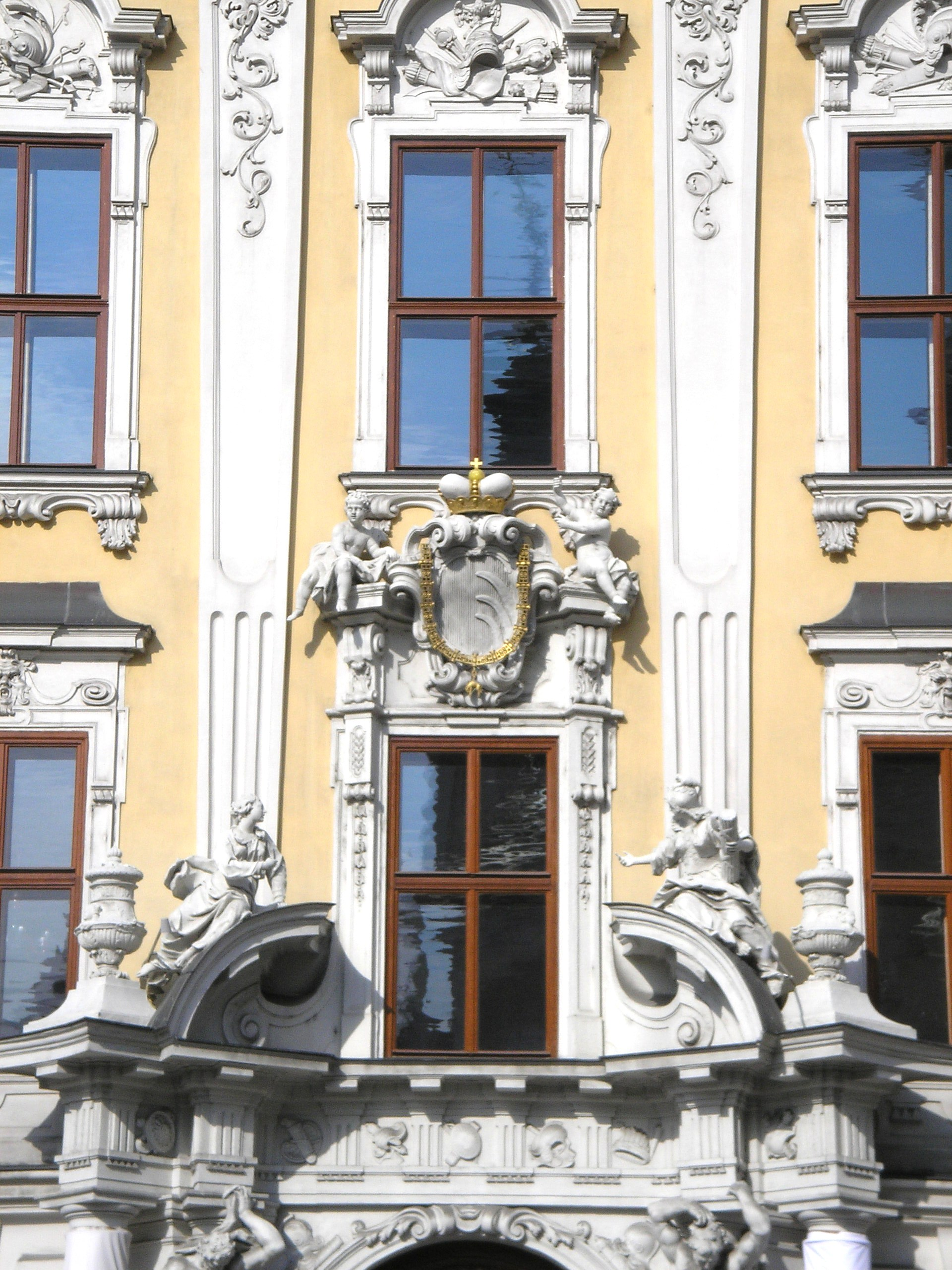
Coat of arms

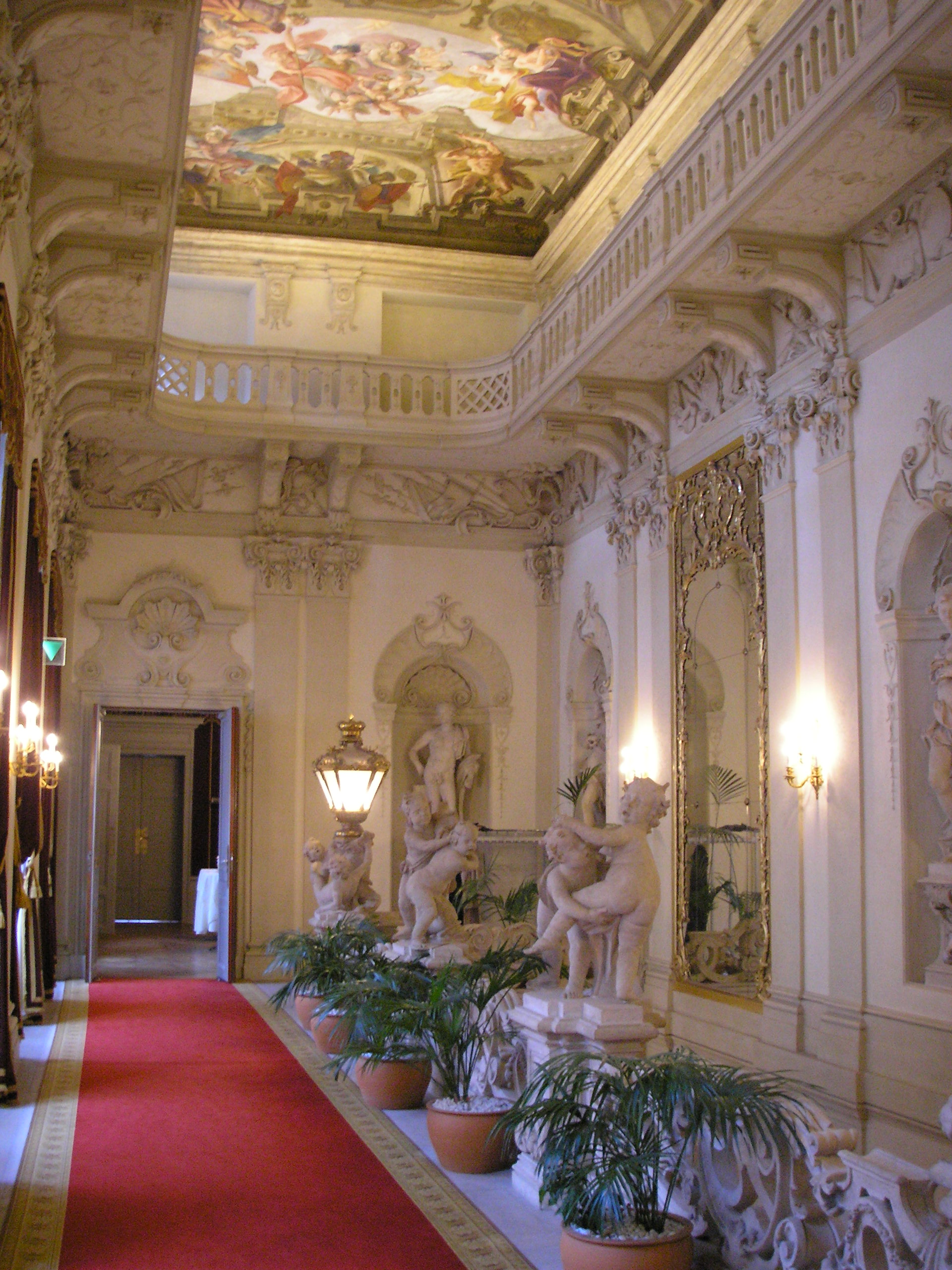
Baroque interior

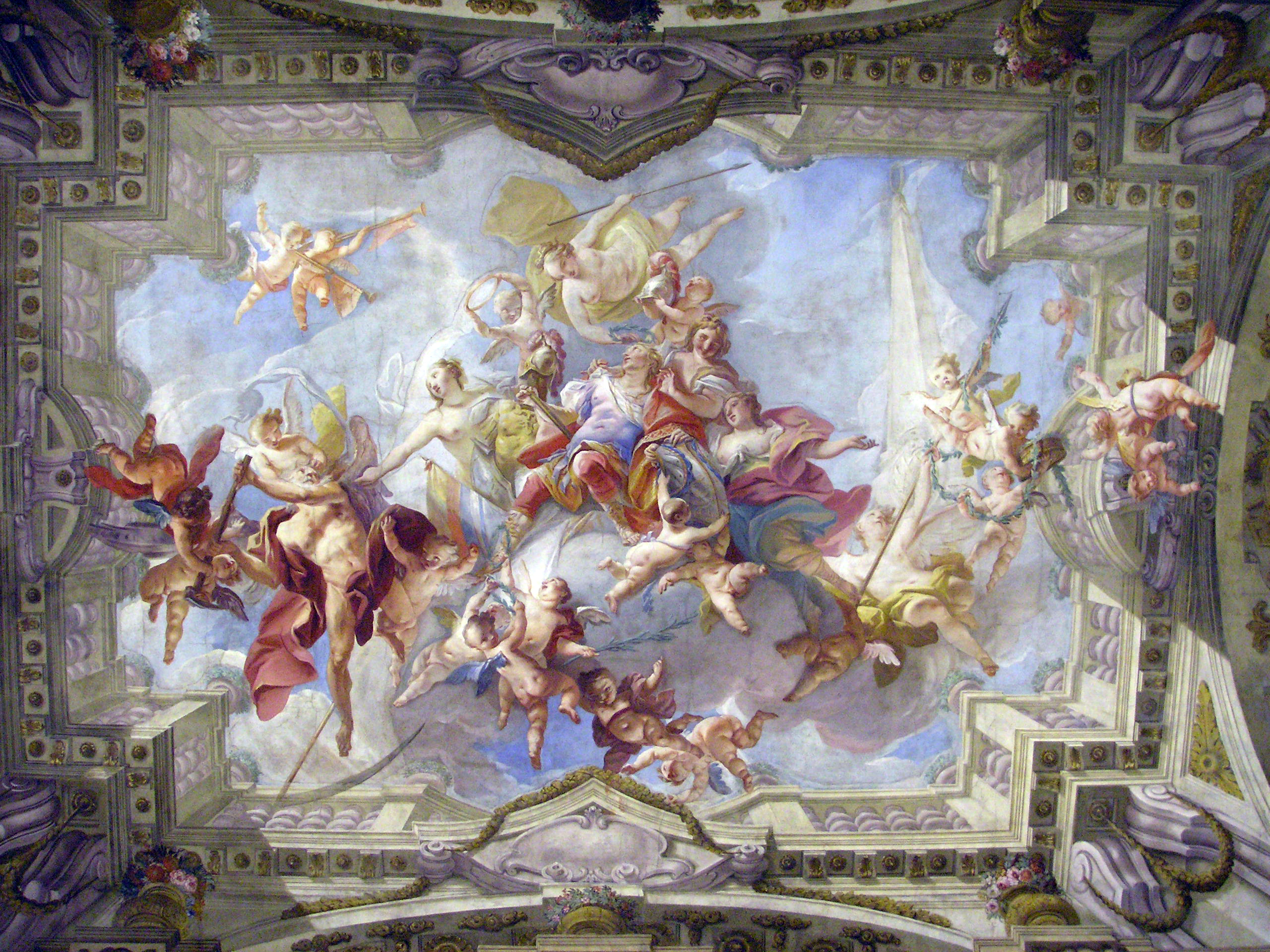
Frescoed ceiling above the grand staircase

== Sources ==
- Wilhelm G. Rizzi, Hellmut Lorenz, Wolfgang Prohaska, Amisola AG (ed.). Palais Daun-Kinsky - Wien, Freyung. Johann Lehner GmbH Verlagsbüro, Vienna. 2001. ISBN 3-901749-22-5
