= Rudolf, 6th Prince Kinsky of Wchinitz and Tettau =

Rudolf
- Prince Kinsky of Wchinitz and Tettau
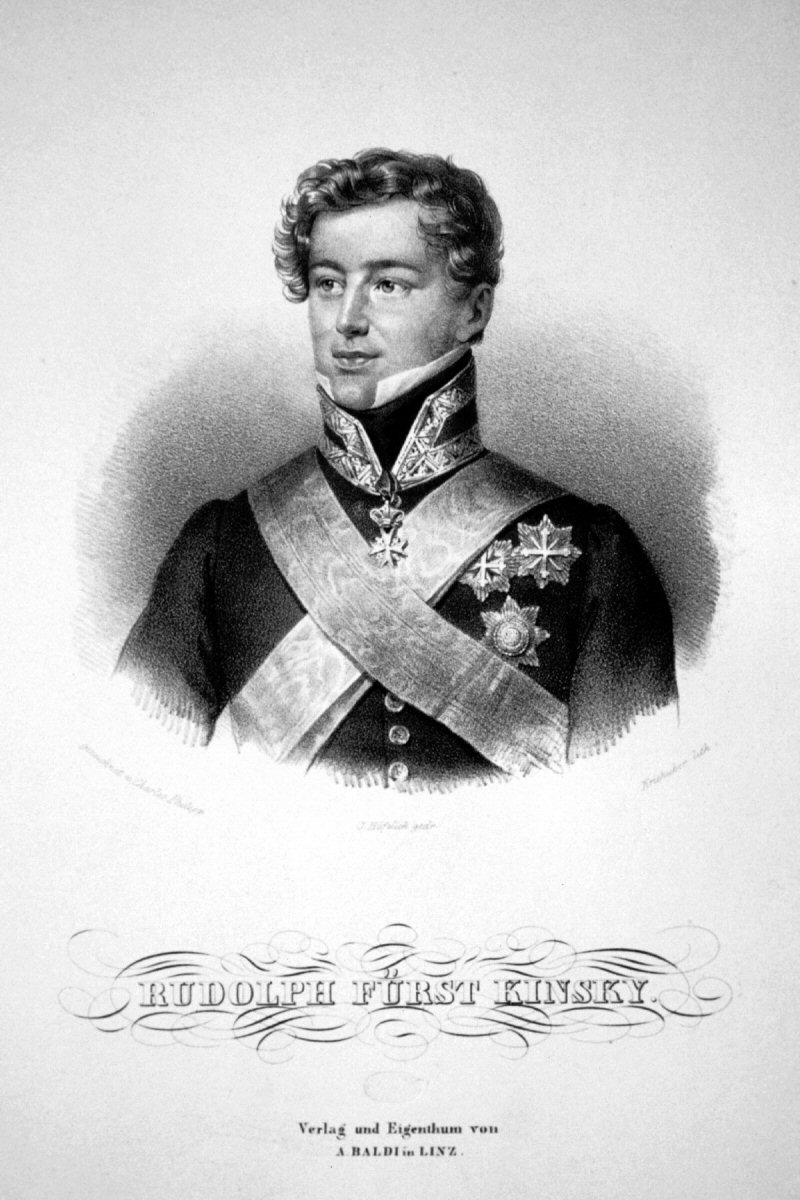
- Born: 30 March 1802; Prague, Kingdom of Bohemia
- Died: 27 January 1836 (aged 33); Linz, Austrian Empire
- Spouse: Countess Wilhelmine of Colloredo-Mansfeld
- Issue: Marie, Countess of Thun and Hohenstein; Ferdinand Bonaventura, 7th Prince Kinsky of Wchinitz and Tettau; Rudolhpine, Countess Franz of Bellegarde
Names
- Rudolf Josef Anton Ferdinand Franz Leonhard Wilhelm Guido
- House: Kinsky
- Father: Ferdinand, 5th Prince Kinsky of Wchinitz and Tettau
- Mother: Baroness Maria Charlotte Caroline of Kerpen

Rudolf, 6th Prince Kinsky of Wchinitz and Tettau (German: Rudolf Josef Anton Ferdinand Franz Leonhard Wilhelm Guido Fürst Kinsky von Wchinitz und Tettau; 30 March 1802 – 27 January 1836) was the 6th Prince Kinsky of Wchinitz and Tettau.

== Early life ==
Rudolf was born at Prague, Kingdom of Bohemia elder son of Ferdinand, 5th Prince Kinsky of Wchinitz and Tettau and Baroness Maria Charlotte Caroline of Kerpen. He became the prince at the age of 9, upon the death of his father in 1812.

== Marriage and family ==
Rudolf married on 12 May 1825 in Prague to Countess Wilhelmine Elisabeth of Colloredo-Mannsfeld (1804–1871), only daughter of Count Hieronymus of Colloredo-Mannsfeld and his wife, Countess Wilhelmine of Waldstein.

They had three children:

- Countess Marie Karoline Kinsky of Wchinitz and Tettau (22 September 1832 – 29 December 1904), married in 1850 to Theodor, Graf von Thun und Hohenstein; had issue.
- Ferdinand Bonaventura, 7th Prince Kinsky of Wchinitz and Tettau (22 October 1834 – 2 January 1904), married in 1856 to Princess Maria Josepha of Liechtenstein; had issue.
- Countess Rudolphine Karoline Kinsky of Wchinitz and Tettau (26 June 1836 – 25 November 1899), married in 1857 to Count Franz Alexander Ernst Noyel of Bellegarde; had issue.

The Rudolph Stone at Bohemian Switzerland in Jetřichovice was named after him. He was owner of Choceň Castle from 1824 until his death in 1836, he was succeeded by his only son Ferdinand Bonaventura.

== Ancestry ==
Ancestors of Rudolf, 6th Prince Kinsky of Wchinitz and Tettau

8. Franz de Paula Ulrich, 3rd Prince Kinsky of Wchinitz and Tettau
4. Joseph, 4th Prince Kinsky of Wchinitz and Tettau
9. Countess Sidonie of Hohenzollern-Hechingen
2. Ferdinand, 5th Prince Kinsky of Wchinitz and Tettau
10. Ferdinand Bonaventura II Anton, Count of Harrach of Rohrau and Thannhausen
5. Countess Rosa Harrach of Rohrau and Thannhausen
11. Countess Maria Rosa of Harrach of Rohrau and Thannhausen
1. Rudolf, 6th Prince Kinsky of Wchinitz and Tettau
12. Baron Lothar Franz of Kerpen
6. Baron Franz of Kerpen
13. Baroness Maria Charlotte Mohr of Wald
3. Baroness Maria Charlotte of Kerpen
14. Baron Marquard Eustach of Hornstein-Göffingen
7. Baroness Maria Antonetta of Hornstein-Göffingen
15. Walburga Schertel von Burtenbach

== Notes and sources ==
- Almanach de Gotha, Reference: 1874 150
- Genealogisches Handbuch des Adels, Fürstliche Häuser, Reference:

Rudolf, 6th Prince Kinsky of Wchinitz and Tettau House of Kinsky Born: 30 March 1802 Died: 27 January 1836
Titles of nobility
Preceded by Ferdinand	Prince Kinsky of Wchinitz and Tettau; 3 November 1812 – 27 January 1836	Succeeded by Ferdinand Bonaventura
