= Franz de Paula Ulrich, 3rd Prince Kinsky of Wchinitz and Tettau =

Austrian general and prince (1726–1792)

Franz de Paula Ulrich Prince Kinsky of Wchinitz and Tettau
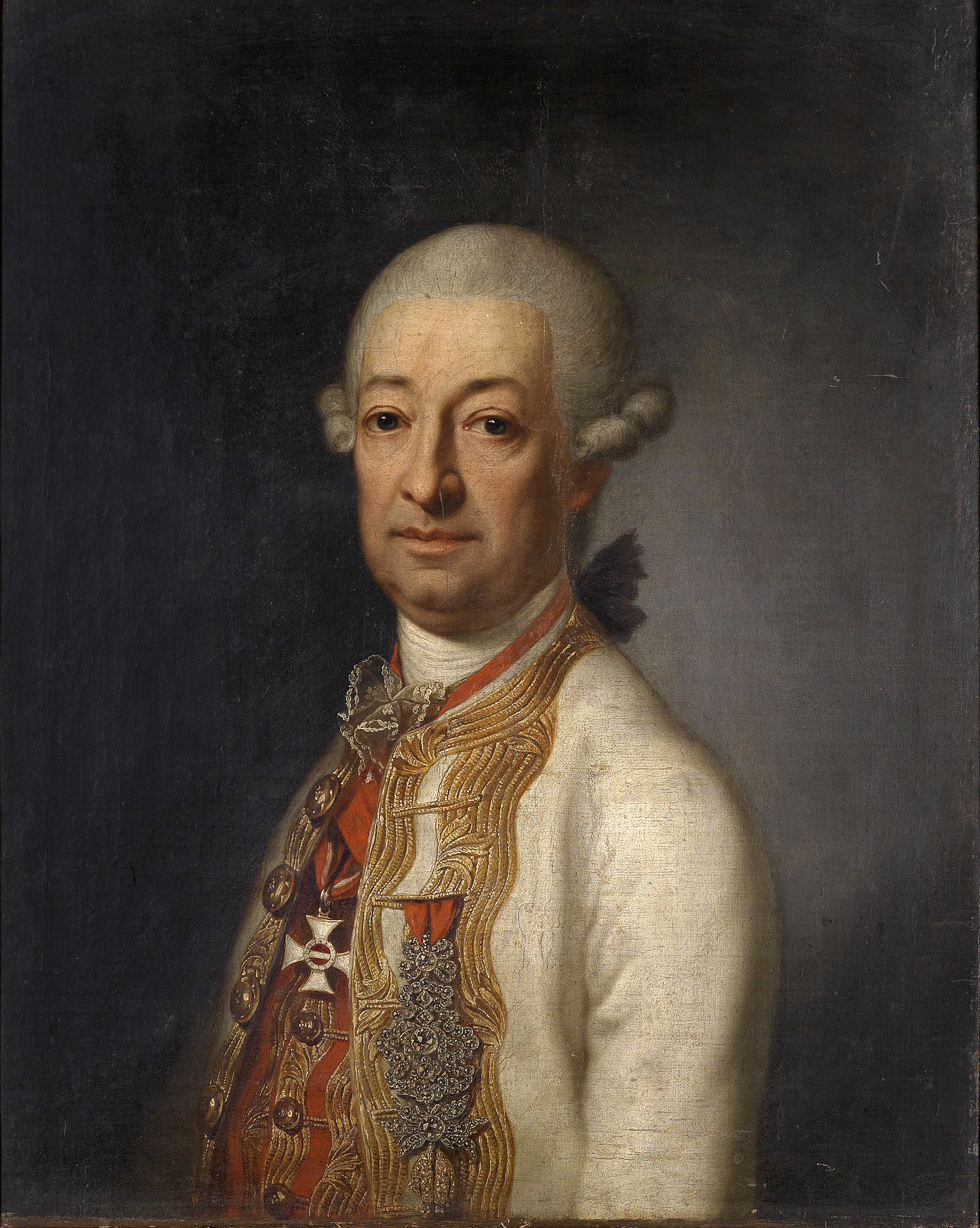
- Portrait by Johann Baptist von Lampi the Elder (c. 1760–92)
- Born: 23 June 1726; Zlonice, Kingdom of Bohemia
- Died: 19 December 1792 (aged 66); Prague, Kingdom of Bohemia
- Relatives: Count Philip Kinsky of Wchinitz and Tettau (father)
- Military career
- Allegiance: Habsburg monarchy
- Branch: Colonel and Proprietor, 36th Infantry Regiment
- Service years: 1753–1778
- Rank: Field Marshal
- Conflicts: Seven Years' War
- Awards: Military Order of Maria Theresa

Franz de Paula Ulrich, 3rd Prince Kinsky of Wchinitz und Tettau, (23 June 1726 – 19 December 1792) was a Bohemian noble and general in service of the House of Habsburg. He was born in Zlonice, Bohemia and died in Prague, Bohemia (present day Czech Republic).

Originally a career bureaucrat in Habsburg state service, he inherited the family properties and title following the deaths of his father and his uncle in 1749, and the childless death of his cousin in 1752. Upon his succession, he left state service and joined the Habsburg military. He distinguished himself in several battles of the Seven Years' War, particularly at the battles of Lobositz and Kolin. He retired from the military in 1778, just prior to the War of the Bavarian Succession, to care for his widespread estates in Moravia, Bohemia, and Vienna. He died in 1792.

== Family and career ==
His father, Count Philip Kinsky of Wchinitz and Tettau (1700–1749), was a Habsburg state administrator, jurist, and ambassador to the Court of St. James's. He married Maria Carolina, Countess of Martinitz in 1722: from this marriage, he had four sons and four daughters. For the eldest son, Franz de Paula Ulrich, he planned a career in government service, similar to his own, which his son accepted. Franz de Paula Ulrich served for a short time in the Hofrat (High Council) in a juridical position. While in this branch of the state service, on 12 September 1749, he married Countess Maria Sidonie of Hohenzollern-Hechingen (1729–1815); they had four children: Philipp Joseph, Joseph, Wenzel Octavian and Maria Anna.

In 1752, his cousin, the Fürst Franz Joseph, died childless; his own father had died in 1749, as had his uncle. The allodial seat came to him. After his succession, he gave up state bureaucratic service and joined the Army. He was assigned to the Regiment Colledo in 1754, and in the following year, promoted to Colonel and regimental commander. He led this regiment during the Battle of Lobositz, the first battle of the Seven Years' War and the following year he was promoted to Major General, on 25 June 1757 (effective 26 January 1757).

In the second campaign of the war, 1757, he commanded the Infantry Regiment Bolla, in the Austrian victory at the Battle of Kolin. During the battle, he led his regiment to secluded, low ground where they fixed their bayonets and fell upon the Prussian flank; his regiment fought against twice their number, and the Prussians were armed with two cannons. In the battle he was so badly wounded he had to be carried from the field. Reportedly, General Loudon wrote to the Empress that she should put the Order in the regimental flag. He received the Knights Cross of the Military Order of Maria Theresa on 7 March 1758.

He returned to the field for the Battle of Mansfeld, in September of that year, his horse was killed by a cannonball, and he received a severe contusion. In the third campaign, he participated in the Battle of Hochkirch, in which Leopold Josef Graf Daun masterminded an early morning attack on the Prussian camp. In this battle, he lost two horses when they were shot from under him. He received the Commanders Cross on 15 September 1758, and was promoted to Lieutenant Field Marshal on 19 March 1759.

In 1767, he was appointed Feldzeugmeister, of General of Artillery; he also became a member of the Imperial Privy Council on 28 January 1767. He served as Director-General of Artillery, from February 1772 to 1778, when he was promoted to Field Marshal in March of that year. In this capacity, he participated in the War of the Bavarian Succession. In 1761, the Emperor appointed him as Colonel and Proprietor (Inhaber) of the Infantry Regiment N°36, a position he held until his death 18 December 1792. He retired from the military service in 1779, and managed his extensive properties in Vienna, Prague and Moravia. He received the Order of the Golden Fleece on 21 September 1771.

== Ancestry ==
Ancestors of Franz de Paula Ulrich, 3rd Prince Kinsky of Wchinitz and Tettau

16. Wenceslaus Kinsky of Wchinitz and Tettau
8. Count Jan Oktavian Kinsky of Wchinitz and Tettau
17. Elisabeth Kragjrz of Kraigk
4. Count Wenceslaus Norbert Kinsky of Wchinitz and Tettau
18. Count Johann of Porcia and Brugnera
9. Countess Margaretha Magdalena of Porcia and Brugnera
19. Baroness Anna Maria of Raunach
2. Count Philip Kinsky of Wchinitz and Tettau
20. Bertram, Baron of Nesselrode
10. Philipp Wilhelm Christoph, Baron of Nesselrode
21. Maria Magdalena von Hatzfeldt-Wildenburg
5. Baroness Anna Theresia of Nesselrode
22. Baron Heinrich Wilhelm of Leerodt
11. Baroness Adriana of Leerodt
23. Baroness Johanna Franziska of Cortenbach
1. Franz de Paula Ulrich, 3rd Prince Kinsky of Wchinitz and Tettau
24. Count Jaroslav Bořita z Martinic
12. Count Maximilian Valentin Borita of Martinic
25. Marie Eusebie ze Sternberka
6. Count Jiri Adam Ignác Borita of Martinic
26. Bernhard Bukuwka von Bukuwky
13. Anna Katharina Bukuwka von Bukuwky
27. Anna Maria Sobekursky von Sobekur
3. Countess Marie Karolina Borita of Martinic
28. Jan Rudolf of Sternberka
14. Count Oldrich Adolf Vratislav of Sternberka
29. Helene Eustachie Krinecka z Ronova
7. Countess Josepha of Sternberka
30. Jachym Oldrich, Count of Chlumu a Kosumberka
15. Countess Anna Lucia Slavata of Chlumu a Kosumberka
31. Countess Franziska of Meggau

== Sources ==
=== Bibliography ===
- Smith, Digby; Kudrna, Leopold (2008). Burnham, Robert (ed.). "Kinsky von Wchinitz un Tettau, Franz de Paula Ulrich Graf". The Napoleon Series.
- (in German)Wurzbach, Constant von. Biographisches lexikon des kaiserthums Österreich. Vienna: k. u. k Hof-und staatsdruckerei, 1856–91, vol. 11,

Franz de Paula Ulrich, 3rd Prince Kinsky of Wchinitz and Tettau House of Kinsky Born: 23 April 1726 Died: 18 December 1792
Military offices
Preceded by	Proprietor (Inhaber) of Infantry Regiment N°36; 1761–1792	Succeeded by Karl Aloys zu Fürstenberg
Titles of nobility
Preceded by Franz Joseph	Prince Kinsky of Wchinitz and Tettau; 23 September 1752 – 18 December 1792	Succeeded by Joseph
