= Ferdinand, 5th Prince Kinsky of Wchinitz and Tettau =

Ferdinand
- Prince Kinsky of Wchinitz and Tettau
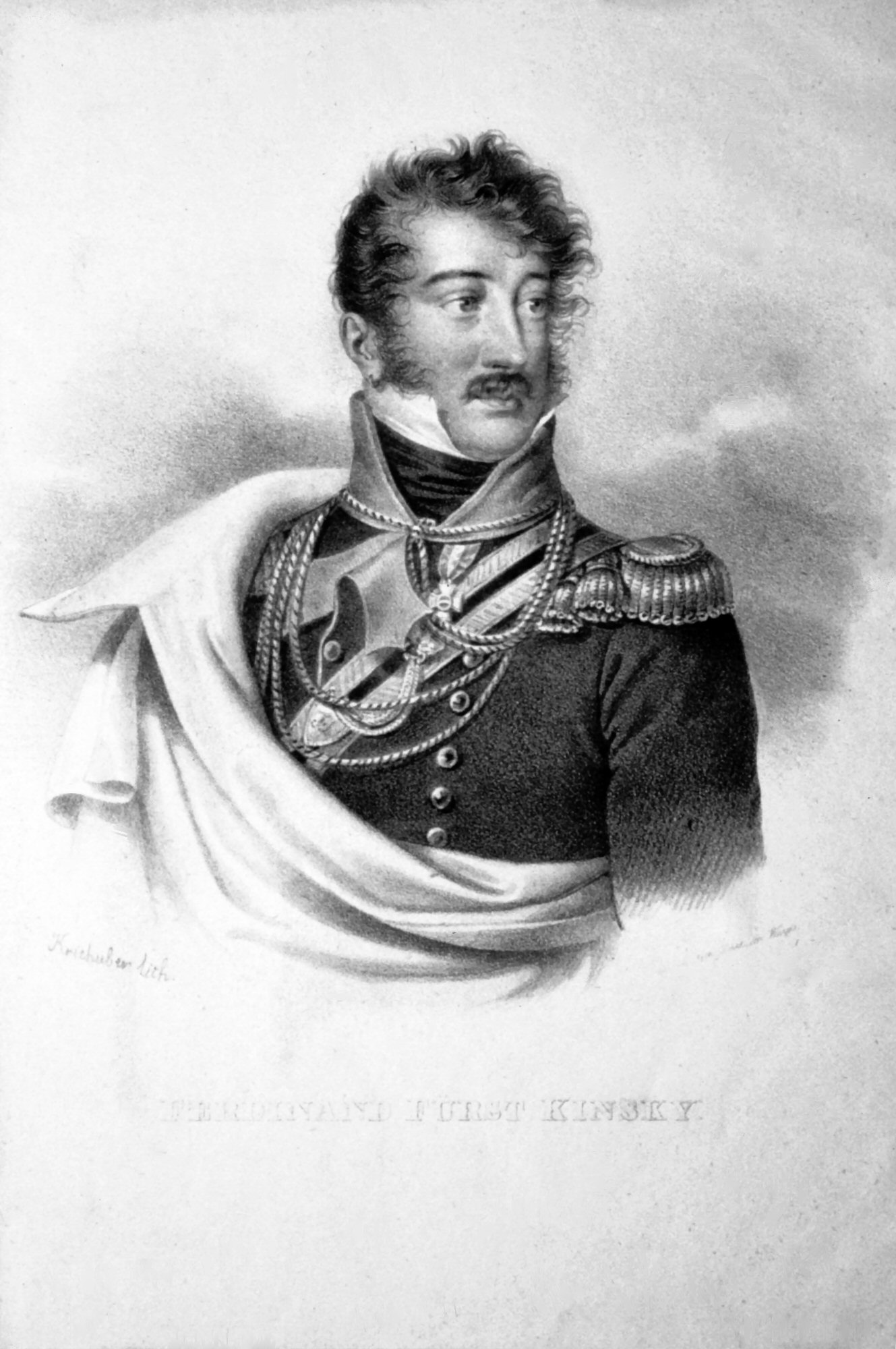
- Lithograph by Josef Kriehuber
- Born: 5 December 1781; Vienna, Habsburg monarchy
- Died: 3 November 1812 (aged 30); Veltrusy, Kingdom of Bohemia
- Spouse: Baroness Maria Charlotte Caroline of Kerpen
- Issue: Rudolf, 6th Prince Kinsky of Wchinitz and Tettau; Count Joseph Sidonius
Names
- Rudolf Josef Anton Ferdinand Franz Leonhard Wilhelm Guido
- House: Kinsky
- Father: Joseph, 4th Prince Kinsky of Wchinitz and Tettau
- Mother: Countess Rosa of Harrach of Rohrau and Thannhausen

Ferdinand, 5th Prince Kinsky of Wchinitz and Tettau (German: Ferdinand Johann Nepomuk Fürst Kinsky von Wchinitz und Tettau; 5 December 1781 – 3 November 1812) was the 5th Prince Kinsky of Wchinitz and Tettau.

== Early life ==
Ferdinand was born at Vienna, Habsburg monarchy as the elder son of Joseph, 4th Prince Kinsky of Wchinitz and Tettau (1751–1798) and Countess Rosa of Harrach of Rohrau and Thannhausen (1758–1814). He became Prince upon the death of his father in 1798. In 1809 he became one of Ludwig van Beethoven's important patrons.

== Marriage and family ==
Ferdinand married on 8 June 1801 in Prague to Baroness Maria Charlotte of Kerpen (1782–1841), second daughter of Baron Lothar Franz Christoph of Kerpen, and his wife, Baroness Maria Charlotte Mohr of Wald.

They had two children:

- Rudolf, 6th Prince Kinsky of Wchinitz and Tettau (30 March 1802 – 27 January 1836), married in 1825 to Countess Wilhelmine of Colloredo-Mansfeld; had issue.
- Count Joseph Sidonius Kinsky of Wchinitz and Tettau (25 October 1806 – 17 July 1862), married in 1828 to Countess Marie Henriette Czernin of Chudenitz; had issue.

== Ancestry ==
Ancestors of Ferdinand, 5th Prince Kinsky of Wchinitz and Tettau

16. Count Wenceslaus Norbert of Wchinitz and Tettau
8. Count Philip Kinsky of Wchinitz and Tettau
17. Baroness Anna Theresia of Nesselrode
4. Franz de Paula Ulrich, 3rd Prince Kinsky of Wchinitz and Tettau
18. Count Jiri Adam Ignác Borita of Martinic
9. Countess Marie Karolina Borita of Martinic
19. Countess Josepha of Sternberka
2. Joseph, 4th Prince Kinsky of Wchinitz and Tettau
20. Philipp, Prince of Hohenzollern-Hechingen
10. Count Hermann Friedrich of Hohenzollern-Hechingen
21. Margravine Marie Sidonie of Baden
5. Countess Sidonie of Hohenzollern-Hechingen
22. Franz Albrecht, Prince of Oettingen-Spielberg
11. Countess Maria Josefa of Oettingen-Spielberg
23. Baroness Johanna Margaretha of Schwendi
1. Ferdinand, 5th Prince Kinsky of Wchinitz and Tettau
24. Ferdinand Bonaventura I, Count of Harrach of Rohrau
12. Aloys Thomas Raymund, Count of Harrach of Rohrau and Thannhausen
25. Countess Johanna Theresia of Lamberg
6. Ferdinand Bonaventura II Anton, Count of Harrach of Rohrau and Thannhausen
26. Count Johann Joseph of Thannhausen
13. Countess Anna Cacilia of Thannhausen
27. Countess Anna Eleonore of Wetzhausen
3. Countess Rosa of Harrach of Rohrau and Thannhausen
28. Aloys Thomas Raymund, Count of Harrach of Rohrau and Thannhausen (= 12)
14. Count Friedrich August of Harrach-Rohrau and Thannhausen
29. Countess Anna Cacilia of Thannhausen (= 13)
7. Countess Maria Rosa of Harrach of Rohrau and Thannhausen
30. Anton Florian, Prince of Liechtenstein
15. Princess Maria Eleonora of Liechtenstein
31. Countess Eleonore Barbara of Thun and Hohenstein

== Notes and sources ==
- Genealogisches Handbuch des Adels, Fürstliche Häuser, Reference: 1956

Ferdinand, 5th Prince Kinsky of Wchinitz and Tettau House of Kinsky Born: 5 December 1781 Died: 3 November 1812
Titles of nobility
Preceded by Joseph	Prince Kinsky of Wchinitz and Tettau; 11 August 1798 – 3 November 1812	Succeeded by Rudolf
