= Hieronymus von Colloredo-Mansfeld =

Austrian corps commander

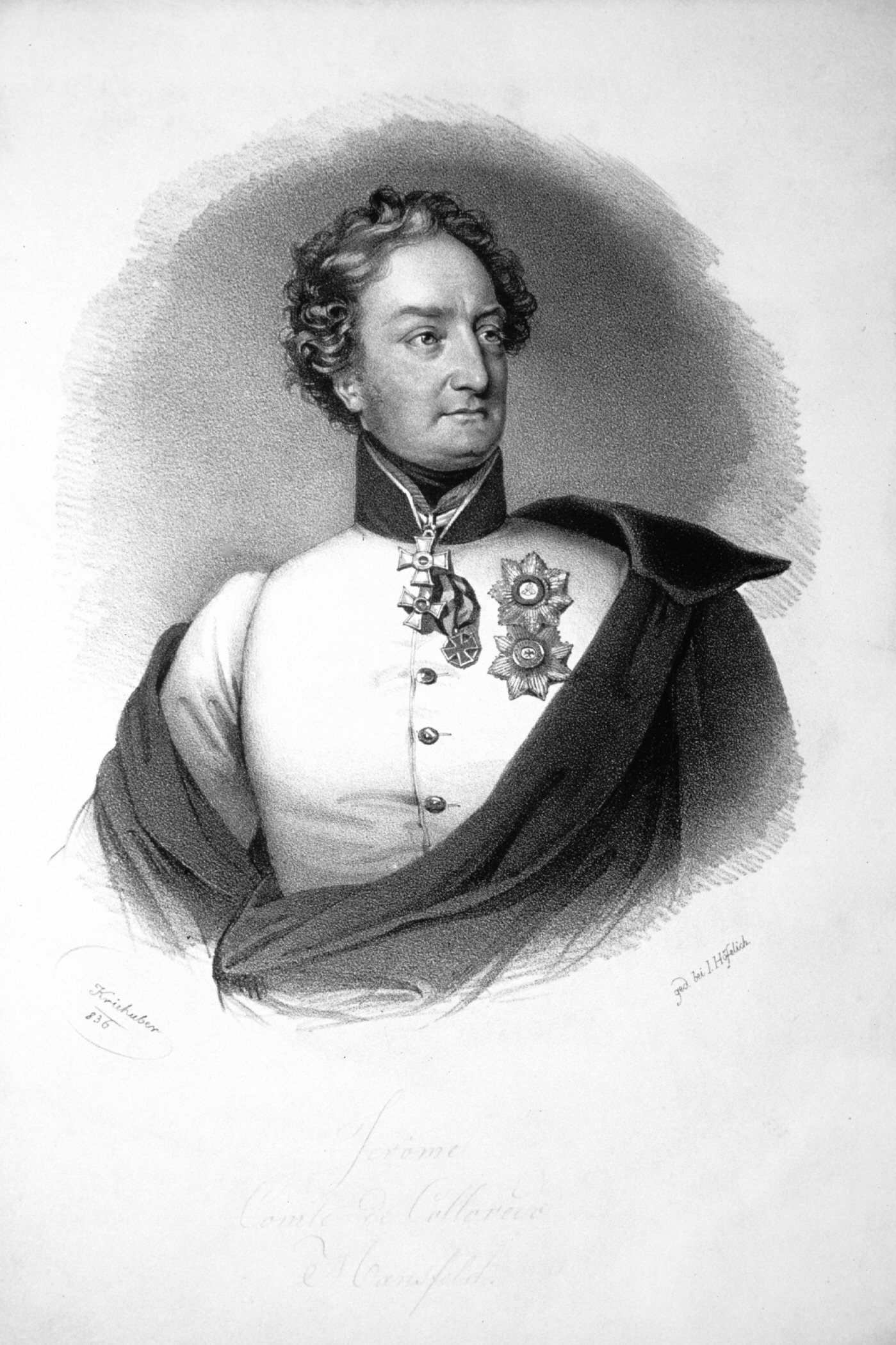
Hieronymus Karl Graf von Colloredo-Mansfeld.

Hieronymus Karl Graf von Colloredo-Mansfeld (30 March 1775 – 23 July 1822) was an Austrian corps commander during the Napoleonic Wars.

== Early life ==
Hieronymus Josef Johann Franz Quirinus was born as the younger son of Prince Franz Gundackar I von Colloredo-Mansfeld (1731-1807) and his wife, Countess Anna Maria Isabella von Mansfeld-Vorderort (1750-1794).

== Career ==
During his military career, he played an important part in the German campaign of 1813, which contributed decisively to the coalition victory at the battle of Kulm.

== Marriage and issue ==
He was married to Countess Wilhelmina Johanna von Waldstein-Wartenberg (1775-1840), daughter of Count Georg Christian von Waldstein-Wartenberg (1743-1791) and his wife, Countess Elisabeth Maria von Ulfeldt (1747-1791). They had one son and a daughter:

- Prince Franz de Paula Gundaker von Colloredo-Mannsfeld (1802-1852); married Countess Christine von Clam-Gallas and had issue.
- Countess Wilhelmina Maria Elisabeth Johanna Baptista (1804-1871); married Prince Rudolf Kinsky von Wchinitz und Tettau and had issue.

== See also ==
- Colloredo-Mannsfeld
