= Ferdinand Bonaventura II von Harrach =

Austrian statesman and diplomat (1708-1778)

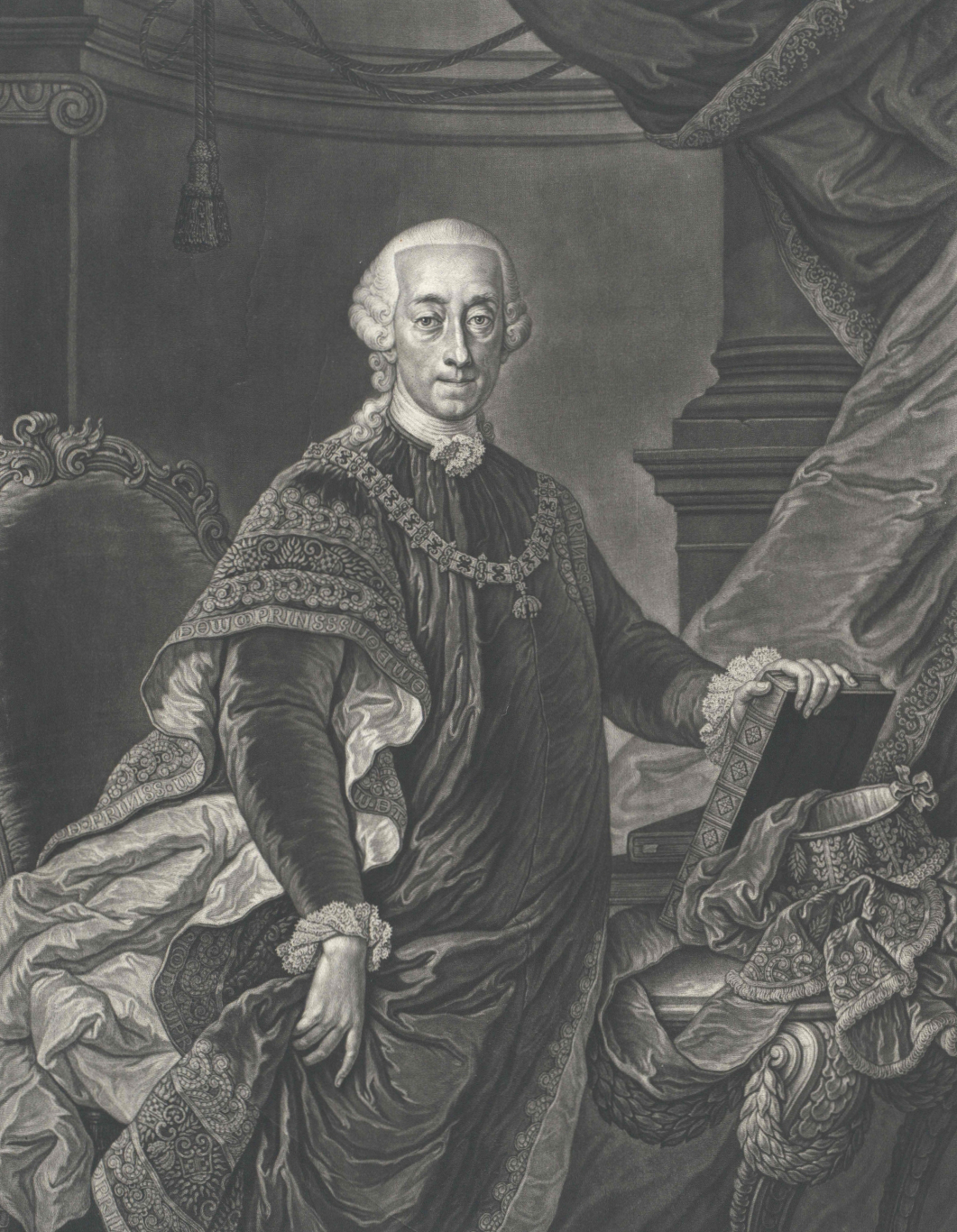
Ferdinand Bonaventura II. von Harrach

Ferdinand Bonaventura Anton von Harrach zu Rohrau und Thannhausen (11 April 1708 – Vienna, 28 January 1778) was an Austrian statesman, diplomat, Knight of the Order of the Golden Fleece and Governor of Milan. To distinguish him from his grandfather of the same name, he is referred to in contemporary sources as Ferdinand Bonaventura II.

== Biography ==
Ferdinand Bonaventura II was the youngest son of Aloys Thomas Raimund, Count Harrach and his second wife Anna Cäcilia von Thannhausen.

He entered the civil service and soon became an Austrian Privy councillor. In October 1744 he was seconded as imperial commissioner to the selection of a new Archbishop of Salzburg. From 1745 to 1750 he was Land Marshal of Lower Austria. In October 1746, Maria Theresa sent him to the Congress of Breda as Minister Plenipotentiary.
In August 1747, Count Harrach was appointed Governor of the Duchy of Milan. He mastered this difficult task and returned to Vienna in 1750, one reason was probably also the death of his eldest brother Friedrich August von Harrach-Rohrau in 1749.
Ferdinand Bonaventura was a Knight of the Golden Fleece, State conference minister, Supreme judicial president and from January 1751 President of the Aulic Council.

=== Marriage and children ===
His first marriage, concluded in 1733 with Maria Elizabeth (1718–1738), daughter of Johann Wenzel von Gallas, Viceroy of Naples, remained childless.
In 1740, he married for the second time to Maria Rosa (1721–1785), his own niece, daughter of his brother Friedrich.
The marriage produced two daughters:

- Marie Eleonora (1757), died in infancy
- Maria Rosa Aloysia (1758–1814), married in 1777 with Joseph, 4th Prince Kinsky of Wchinitz and Tettau (1751–1798).

== Sources ==
- ADB:Harrach, Ferdinand Graf von
- University of Klagenfurt
- BLKÖ:Harrach, Ferdinand Bonaventura (II.) Graf von
- Harrach genealogy C11 – D1 – E5 – F15
