= Joseph, 4th Prince Kinsky of Wchinitz and Tettau =

Joseph
- Prince Kinsky of Wchinitz and Tettau
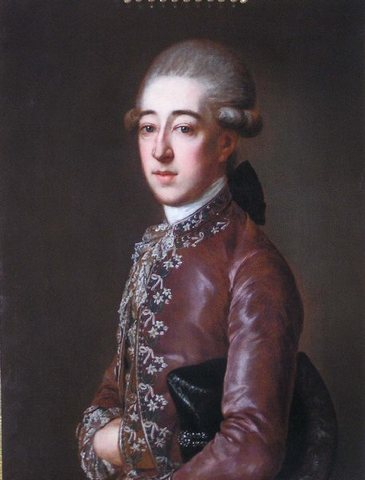
- Born: 12 January 1751; Vienna, Habsburg monarchy
- Died: 11 August 1798 (aged 47); Prague, Kingdom of Bohemia
- Spouse: Countess Rosa of Harrach of Rohrau and Thannhausen
- Issue: Maria Sidonia, Princess of Lobkowicz; Countess Maria Rosa Johanna; Ferdinand, 5th Prince Kinsky of Wchinitz and Tettau; Count Franz de Paula
Names
- Joseph Ernst Leonhard Dominik
- House: House of Kinsky
- Father: Franz de Paula Ulrich, 3rd Prince Kinsky of Wchinitz and Tettau
- Mother: Countess Maria Sidonie of Hohenzollern-Hechingen

Joseph, 4th Prince Kinsky of Wchinitz and Tettau (German: Joseph Ernst Leonhard Dominik Fürst Kinsky von Wchinitz und Tettau; 12 January 1751 – 11 August 1798) was the 4th Prince Kinsky of Wchinitz and Tettau.

== Early life ==
Joseph was born at Vienna, Habsburg monarchy second son of Franz de Paula Ulrich, 3rd Prince Kinsky of Wchinitz and Tettau and Countess Maria Sidonie of Hohenzollern-Hechingen. He became the prince upon the death of his father in 1792.

== Political career ==
Joseph became an Imperial chamberlain in 1767, Lord-in-waiting (wirklicher Kammerherr) in 1772, counsellor to the government of the Archduchy of Austria in 1774, and imperial counsellor in 1775. In this role he travelled extensively throughout Europe. He succeeded his father in 1792, becoming the 4th Prince Kinsky of Wchinitz and Tettau. At this stage he resigned his position in the state service.

He was a patron of Pavel Wranitzky (1756–1808) and other Moravian and Bohemian musicians in Vienna.

== Marriage and family ==
Joseph married on 23 April 1777 in Vienna to Countess Rosa of Harrach of Rohrau and Thannhausen (1758–1814), youngest daughter of Ferdinand Bonaventura II von Harrach and his wife, Countess Maria Rosa of Harrach of Rohrau and Thannhausen.

They had four children:

- Countess Maria Sidonia of Wchinitz and Tettau (12 February 1779 – 26 March 1837), married in 1796 to Anton Isidor, Prince of Lobkowicz; had issue.
- Countess Maria Rosa Johanna of Wchinitz and Tettau (23 May 1780 – 16 March 1842), married to Franz Anton, Count of Kolowrat-Liebsteinsky (1778-1861).
- Ferdinand, 5th Prince Kinsky of Wchinitz and Tettau (5 December 1781 – 3 November 1812), married in 1801 to Baroness Maria Charlotte Caroline of Kerpen; had issue.
- Count Franz de Paula Joseph of Wchinitz and Tettau (23 March 1784 – 17 November 1823), married in 1809 to Countess Therese of Wrbna and Freudenthal; had issue, including Countess Franziska Kinsky of Wchinitz and Tettau.

== Ancestry ==
Ancestors of Joseph, 4th Prince Kinsky of Wchinitz and Tettau

16. Count Jan Oktavian Kinsky of Wchinitz and Tettau
8. Count Wenceslaus Norbert Kinsky of Wchinitz and Tettau
17. Countess Margaretha Magdalena of Porcia and Brugnera
4. Count Philip Joseph Kinsky of Wchinitz and Tettau
18. Philipp Wilhelm Christoph, Baron of Nesselrode
9. Baroness Anna Theresia of Nesselrode
19. Baroness Adriana of Leerodt
2. Franz de Paula Ulrich, 3rd Prince Kinsky of Wchinitz and Tettau
20. Count Maximilian Valentin Borita of Martinic
10. Count Jiri Adam Ignác Borita of Martinic
21. Anna Katharina Bukuwka von Bukuwky
5. Countess Marie Karolina Borita of Martinic
22. Count Oldrich Adolf Vratislav of Sternberka
11. Countess Josepha of Sternberka
23. Count Anna Lucia Slavata of Chlumu a Kosumberka
1. Joseph, 4th Prince Kinsky of Wchinitz and Tettau
24. Johann Georg, Prince of Hohenzollern-Hechingen
12. Philipp, Prince of Hohenzollern-Hechingen
25. Countess Franziska of Salm, Wild- and Rheingräfin in Neufville
6. Count Hermann Friedrich of Hohenzollern-Hechingen
26. Hermann Fortunatus, Margrave of Baden in Rodemachern
13. Margravine Marie Sidonie of Baden
27. Countess Antonie Elisabeth of Criechingen
3. Countess Sidonie of Hohenzollern-Hechingen
28. Johann Franz, Count of Oettingen of Spielberg
14. Franz Albrecht, Prince of Oettingen-Spielberg
29. Countess Ludovica Rosalia of Attems
7. Countess Maria Josefa of Oettingen-Spielberg
30. Franz Ignaz, Baron of Schwendi
15. Baroness Johanna Margaretha of Schwendi
31. Countess Maria Margareta Fugger of Glött

== Notes and sources ==
- Genealogisches Handbuch des Adels, Fürstliche Häuser, Reference: 1956 548

Joseph, 4th Prince Kinsky of Wchinitz and Tettau House of Kinsky Born: 12 January 1751 Died: 11 August 1798
Titles of nobility
Preceded by Franz de Paula Ulrich	Prince Kinsky of Wchinitz and Tettau; 19 December 1792 – 11 August 1798	Succeeded by Ferdinand
