= Ferdinand Bonaventura, 7th Prince Kinsky of Wchinitz and Tettau =

Ferdinand Bonaventura
- Prince Kinsky of Wchinitz and Tettau
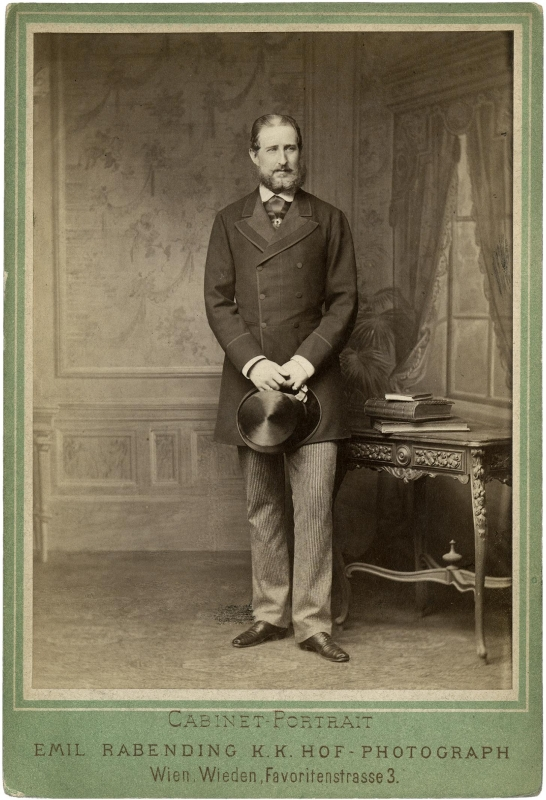
- Ferdinand Bonaventura Kinsky, by Emil Rabending
- Born: 22 October 1834; Vienna, Austrian Empire
- Died: 2 January 1904 (aged 69); Hermanmiestetz, Kingdom of Bohemia
- Spouse: Princess Maria of Liechtenstein (m. 1856)
- Issue: Wilhelmine, Princess of Auersperg; Karl, 8th Prince Kinsky of Wchinitz and Tettau; Rudolf, 9th Prince Kinsky of Wchinitz and Tettau; Franziska, Princess of Montenuovo; Elisabeth, Countess of Wilczek; Count Ferdinand; Marie, Countess Czernin von Chudenitz
Names
- Ferdinand Bonaventura Christian Josef Hieronymus Rudolf Rafael
- House: House of Kinsky
- Father: Rudolf, 6th Prince Kinsky of Wchinitz and Tettau
- Mother: Countess Wilhelmine of Colloredo-Mansfeld

Ferdinand Bonaventura, 7th Prince Kinsky of Wchinitz and Tettau (German: Ferdinand Bonaventura Christian Josef Hieronymus Rudolf Rafael Fürst Kinsky von Wchinitz und Tettau; 22 October 1834 – 2 January 1904) was the 7th Prince Kinsky of Wchinitz and Tettau.

== Early life ==
Prince Ferdinand Bonaventura was born in Vienna, capital of the Austrian Empire, as the only son of Rudolf, 6th Prince Kinsky of Wchinitz and Tettau and Countess Wilhelmine Elisabeth of Colloredo-Mannsfeld. He became the prince at the age of 1, upon the death of his father in 1836.

== Marriage and family ==
Ferdinand Bonaventura was married on 5 April 1856 in Vienna to Princess Maria Josepha of Liechtenstein (1835–1905), youngest daughter of Prince Karl of Liechtenstein and his wife, Countess Franzisca of Wrbna and Freudenthal.

They had seven children:

- Countess Wilhelmine Kinsky of Wchinitz and Tettau (5 April 1857 – 1 October 1909), married in 1878 to Franz, Prince of Auersperg; had issue.
- Karl Rudolf Ferdinand Andreas, 8th Prince Kinsky of Wchinitz and Tettau (29 November 1858 – 11 December 1919), married in 1895 to Countess Elisabeth Wolff-Metternich zur Gracht; no issue.
- Rudolf, 9th Prince Kinsky of Wchinitz and Tettau (11 December 1859 – 13 March 1930), married in 1881 to Countess Marie of Wilczek; had 5 daughters.
- Countess Franziska Kinsky of Wchinitz and Tettau (26 December 1861 – 11 July 1935), married in 1879 to Alfred, 2nd Prince of Montenuovo; had issue.
- Countess Elisabeth Wilhelmina Maria Prokopia Cyrilla Methodia Kinsky of Wchinitz and Tettau (4 July 1865 – 10 July 1941), married in 1884 to Johann, Count of Wilczek; had issue. Grandmother of Georgina, Princess Consort of Liechtenstein, born Countess Georgina von Wilczek
- Count Ferdinand Vincenz Rudolf Kinsky of Wchinitz and Tettau (8 September 1866 – 3 February 1916), married in 1892 to Princess Aglaë of Auersperg; had issue. Father of Ulrich, 10th Prince Kinsky of Wchinitz and Tettau; grandfather of Marie, Princess Consort of Liechtenstein, born Countess Marie Aglaë Kinsky of Wchinitz and Tettau
- Countess Marie Clotilde Kinsky of Wchinitz and Tettau (30 May 1878 – 19 July 1945), married in 1897 to Count Ottokar von Czernin; had issue.

In 1873 he was invested as Knight of the Austrian Order of the Golden Fleece. He died in 1904 and was succeeded by his eldest son Karl.

== Notes and sources ==
- Almanach de Gotha, Reference: 1874 150
- Genealogisches Handbuch des Adels, Fürstliche Häuser, Reference: 1956

Ferdinand Bonaventura, 7th Prince Kinsky of Wchinitz and Tettau House of Kinsky Born: 22 October 1834 Died: 2 January 1904
Titles of nobility
Preceded by Rudolf	Prince Kinsky of Wchinitz and Tettau; 27 January 1836 – 2 January 1904	Succeeded by Karl
