= Himmelkron Abbey =

Abbey in Kulmbach, Bavaria, Germany

Coordinates: 50.0621°N 11.5932°E

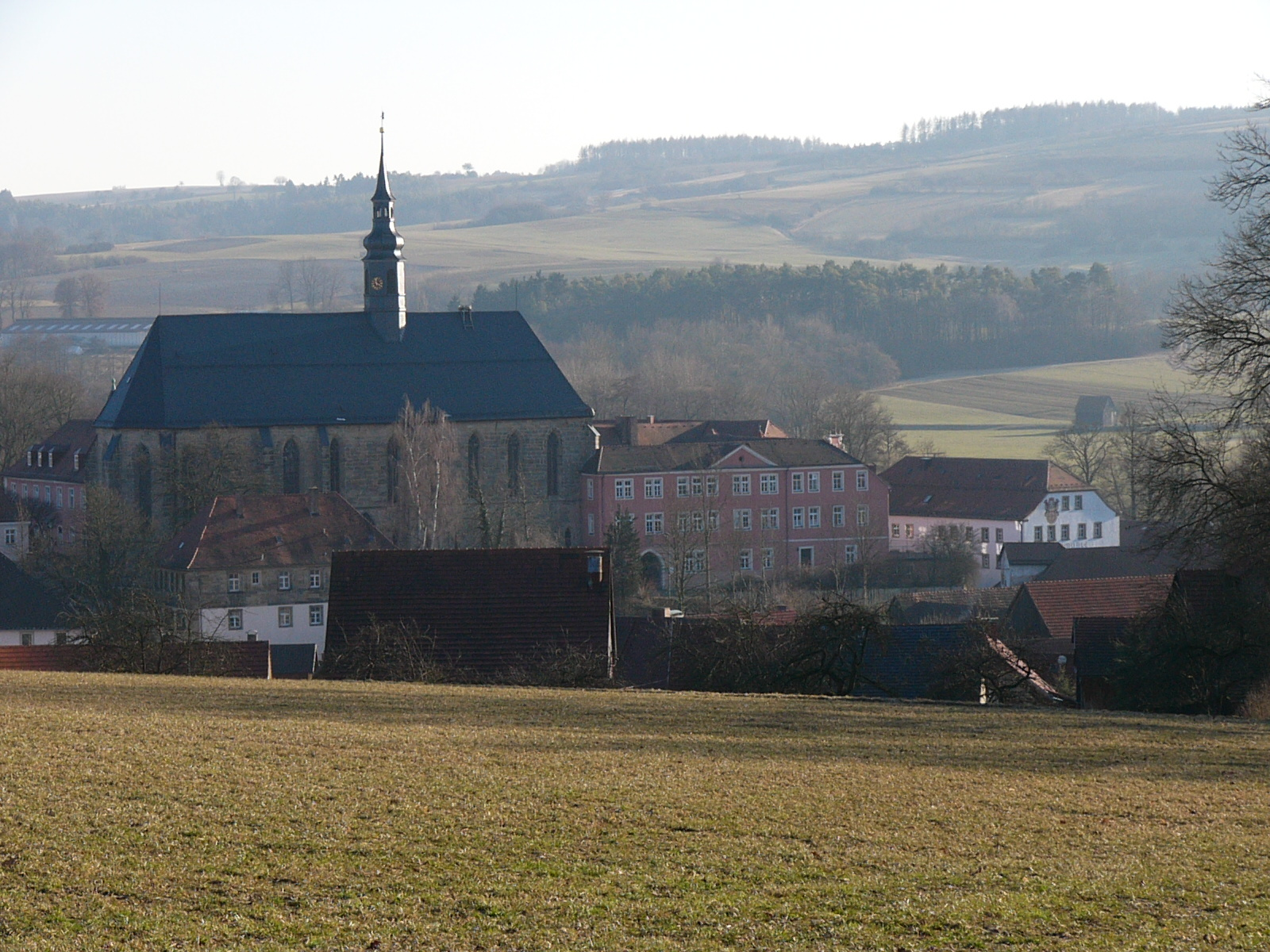
Himmelkron Abbey from the north

Himmelkron Abbey (German: Kloster Himmelkron) is located in Himmelkron in the district of Kulmbach in Upper Franconia, Bavaria, Germany. From the 13th to the 16th century it was a Cistercian abbey in the Archdiocese of Bamberg. It then served the Margraviate of Brandenburg-Bayreuth as a summer residence and Jagdschloss until the 19th century. Today it is a residential home and day care center for people with intellectual disabilities.

The originally Gothic abbey church was baroqueized in the 17th and 18th centuries. Today the collegiate church of St. Mary is an evangelical lutheran parish church. Of the other buildings of the abbey, only one wing of the Gothic cloister has been preserved; the present buildings date mainly from the 16th to 18th centuries. The entire building complex is entered in the Bavarian list of monuments as both an architectural monument and an archaeological monument.

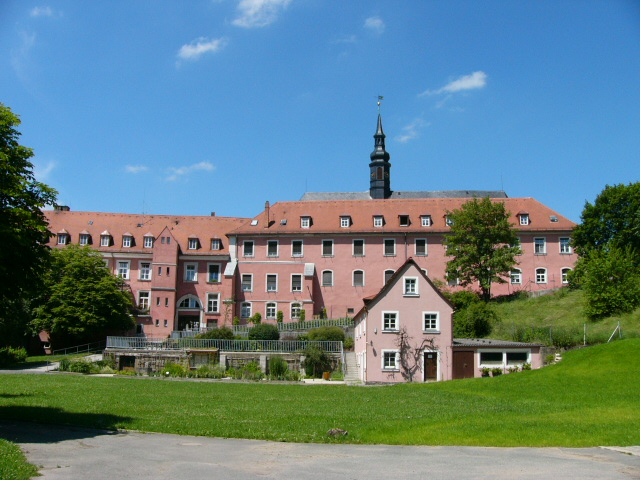
Himmelkron Abbey from the south

== History ==
=== Foundation ===
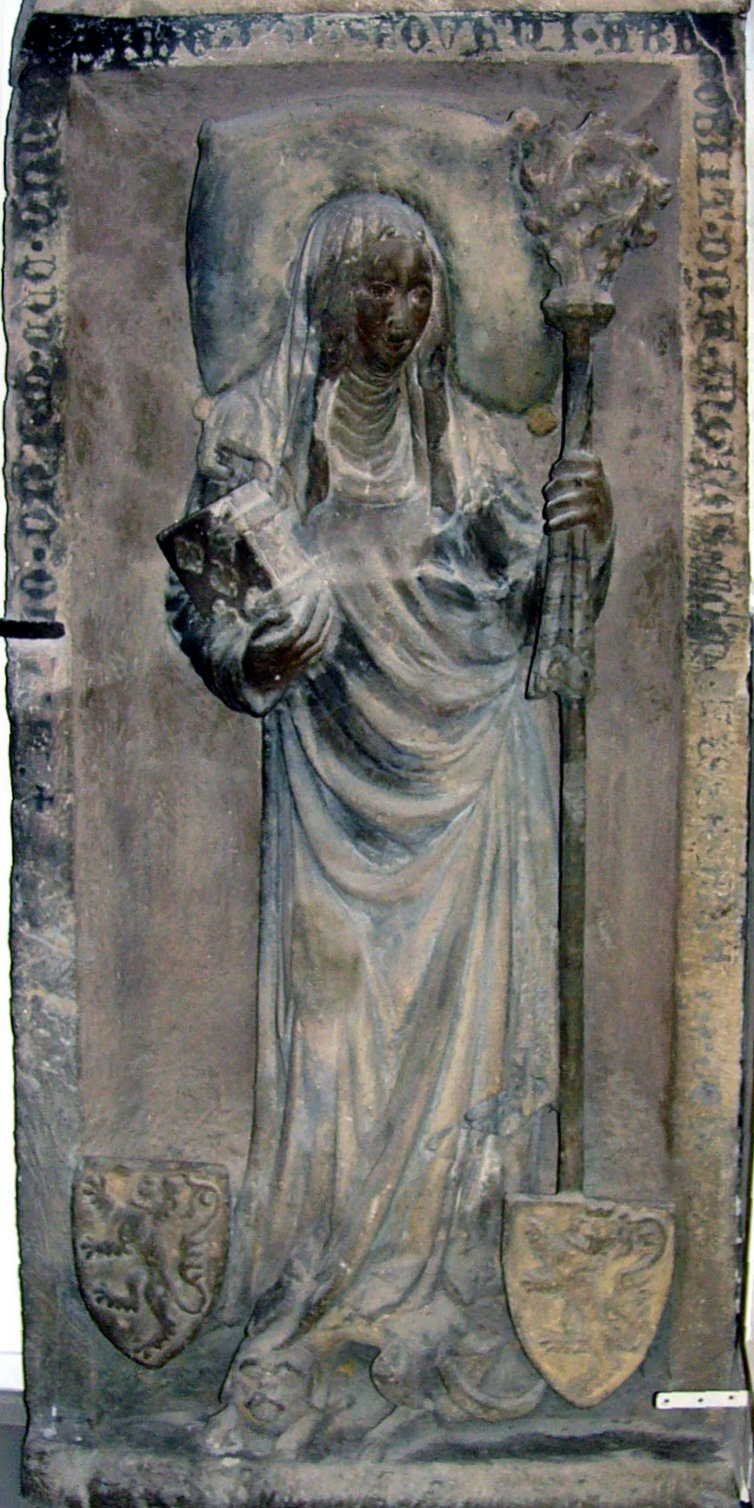
Epitaph of Abbess Agnes of Weimar-Orlamünde (ded 1354)

The abbey was founded in 1279 by Count Otto III (IV) of Weimar-Orlamünde. Through his mother Beatrix, the Orlamünde had received from the inheritance of the Andechs-Meranians the dominion of Plassenburg, to which the village of Pretzendorf also belonged. Otto had Pretzendorf castle converted into an abbey. In addition to the castle and the village of Pretzendorf, Otto gave the abbey the surrounding fields, meadows and forests as well as the villages of Hardt, Nemhards and Boschendorf. The area belonged to the Bamberg diocese, whose bishop at that time was Berthold von Leiningen.

The foundation deed of 28 December 1279 states as the purpose of the foundation that Otto wanted to hand down his memory to posterity and do something for the salvation of his soul. The foundation letter also mentions the name Himmelkron for the new abbey. However, the transfer of this name to the village of Pretzendorf did not take place until the 16th century. In addition to representatives of the local nobility, personalities who clearly show the connection to the monasteries of Sonnefeld and Langheim are listed as witnesses. These included the founder of the Sonnefeld abbey Heinrich II von Sonneberg, the magister Brother Gottfried from Sonnefeld and the abbot of Langheim Abbey, who continued to accompany the development of the Himmelkron abbey as a visitator.

The first nuns of the newly established abbeys probably came from Sonnefeld Abbey, the nearest branch of the Cistercian nuns. Tradition names Otto's daughter Agnes as the first abbess. However, because of the long period between the foundation of the abbey in 1279 and her death in 1354, and because Agnes is not mentioned in the foundation letter, it is assumed that there was at least one other abbess or prioress in the early days of the abbey.

=== Further development ===
For the period from 1398 to 1547, the landlordship of the abbey can be recorded as a nearby scattered estate. It extended in the south into the Bayreuth area and bordered in the southeast on the Warme Steinach. While in the southeast the Red Main formed another natural border, there were possessions in the surroundings of Thurnau beyond that. In the north, the landlordship ended at the Schorgast. In the northeast there were possessions in Stammbach, Mussen and up to the Hof area.

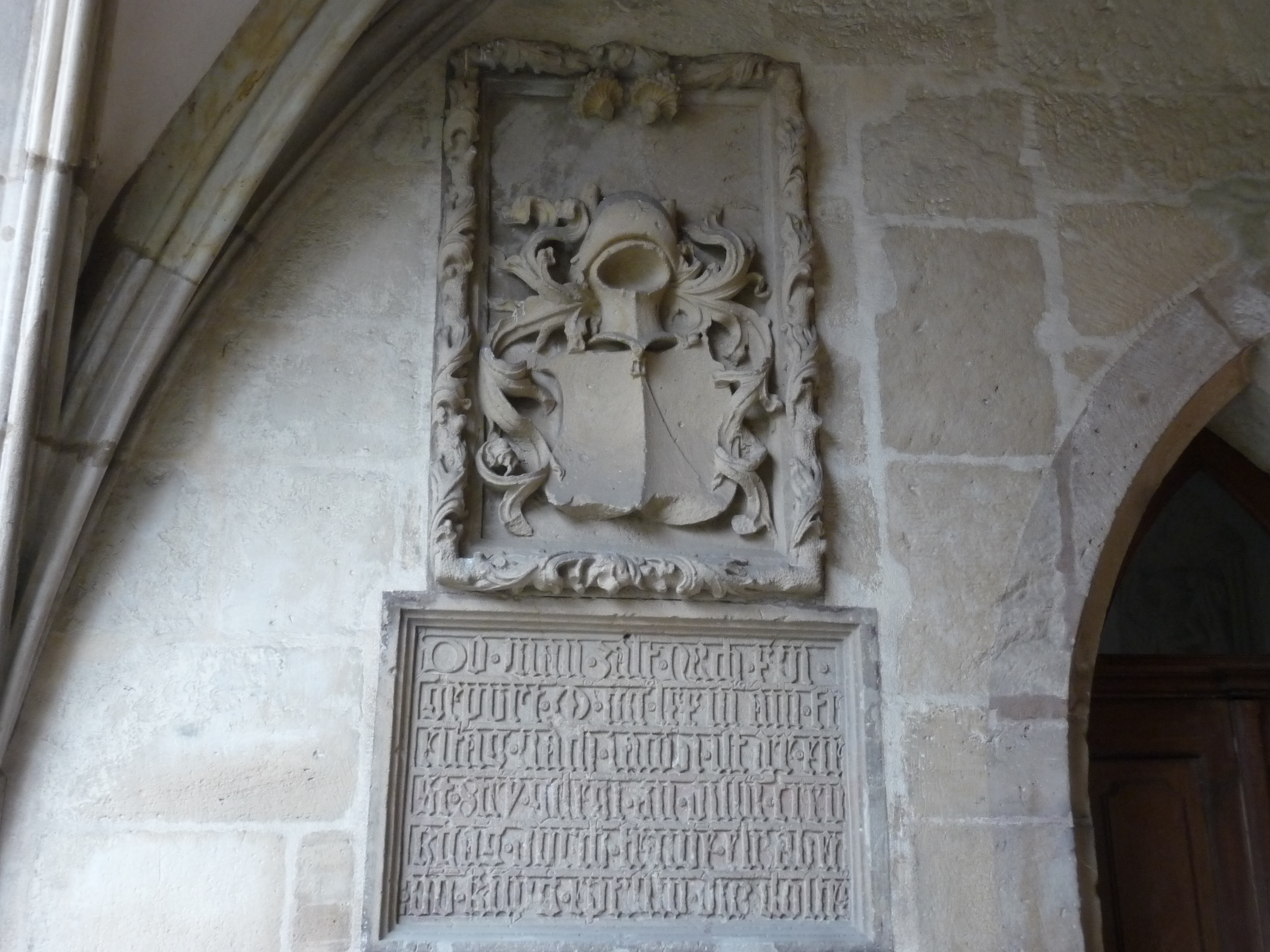
Memorial plaque to Elisabeth von Künsberg as the builder of the cloisters

The history of the abbey can mostly only be traced through war events or major building activities of the abbesses. In 1430, during the Hussite wars, the Hussites came to the area and, among other things, burned down nearby Kulmbach. However, no major damage to Himmelkron abbey has been recorded. Thus, no major reconstruction work was mentioned in the aftermath and many works of art survived the time. The abbesses Elisabeth von Künsberg (1460–1484) and Magdalena von Wirsberg (1499–1522) developed a lively building activity, of which armorial stones and inscriptions still bear witness. Elizabeth's most important building project was probably the construction of the cloister with its many artistic elements in 1473. Magdalena extended the abbey church by a wing. These two building phases were interrupted by the time of Margaret von Zedtwitz (1484–1499), when the abbey suffered from difficult economic conditions. Abbey buildings became ruinous and the cultivation of the lands succeeded only incompletely. The part of the Margraviate of Brandenburg-Kulmbach called Oberland was less affected by the Peasants' War from 1524. Apparently some rebels gathered in Bayreuth, but the damage to the abbey, e.g. the theft of a silver cross, remained minor, and no persons were harmed. Also in the Second Margrave War, looting resulted only in some losses from the inventory.

=== Downfall ===
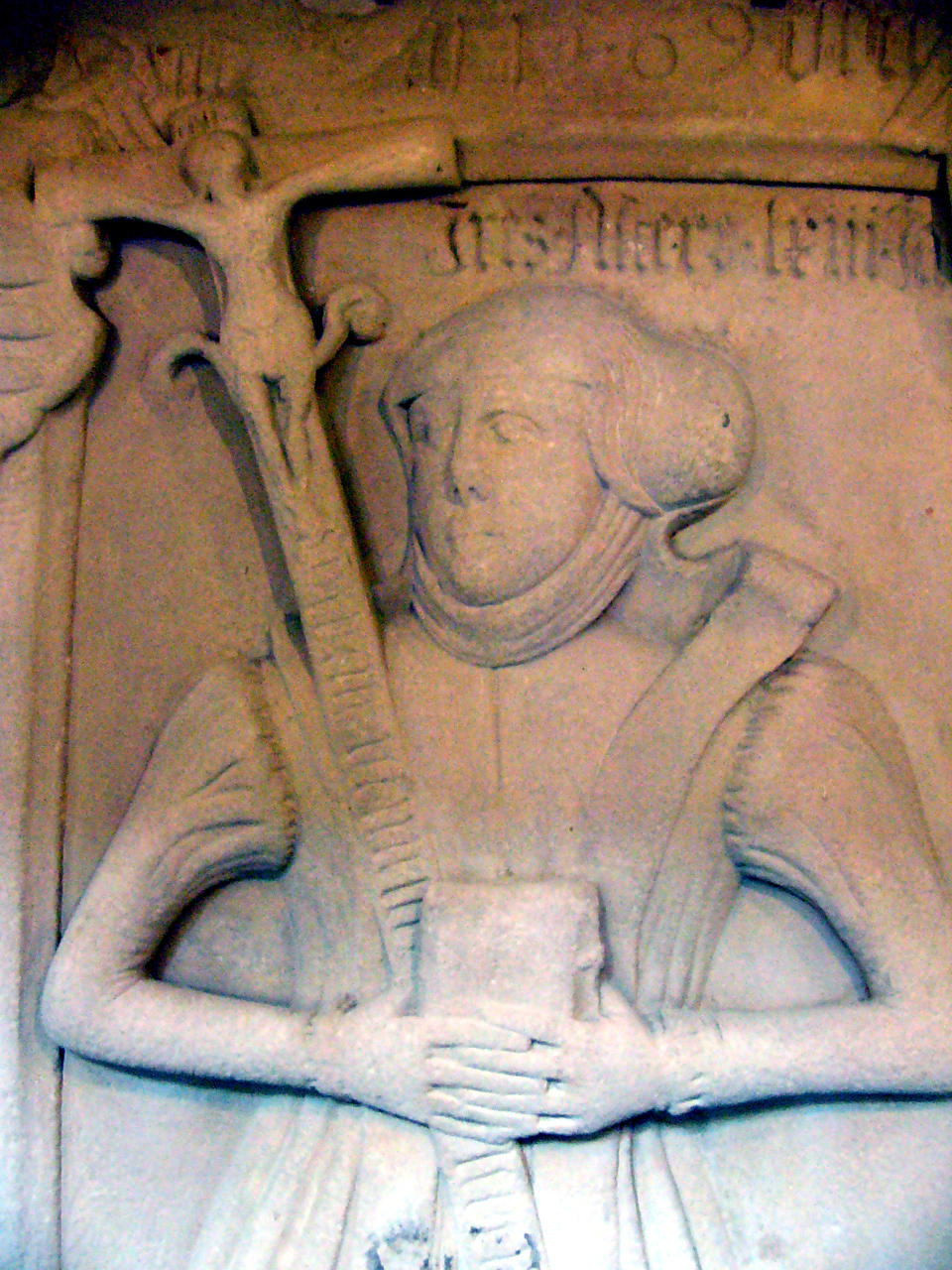
Epitaph of the last abbess Margarethe von Döhlau (died 1569)

In the time of abbess Apollonia von Waldenfels, the Reformation moved into the region and found favor among the population and the clergy. Margrave George, an early follower of Martin Luther, forced conversions to Protestantism and allowed a forcible expulsion of nuns from Himmelkron and Hof unless they accepted the new denomination. The Bamberg bishop Weigand of Redwitz lodged a complaint about this with the Swabian League in 1529. However, the development could not be stopped. The margrave-friendly preacher Johannes Behaim, who was appointed in Himmelkron, criticized Abbess Apollonia and Prioress Dorothea von Wirsberg from the pulpit.

The last abbess of Himmelskron, Margarethe von Döhlau, was appointed in 1544 under Albrecht II. Alcibiades. This gave the margrave the opportunity to impose conditions on the abbess for her conduct of office and to gain insight into life in the abbey and its furnishings. As early as 1545 Margarethe was deposed as abbess and provided with a pension. The income of the abbey was now to be used to maintain Princess Barbara (died 17 June 1591), a cousin of Albrecht who had previously stayed at the Heilsbronn abbey. In 1548 Margarethe was reinstated as abbess; she converted to Protestantism. The number of nuns decreased to two by 1560. Margarethe eventually converted part of the convent into a school for noble girls. The school existed only until the end of the 16th century, and at last it also accepted commoners and boys.

=== Abbesses ===
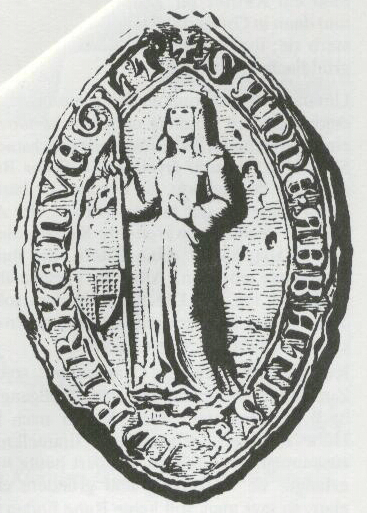
Seal of Anna of Nuremberg, abbess 1370-1383

Lists of the abbesses of Himmelkron abbey were compiled by Johann E. Teichmann in 1739 and by Pastor Theodor Zinck in 1925. Both named 16 abbesses and began their list with Agnes von Weimar-Orlamünde.

There are sparse references to further abbesses, their names are partly unsecured. Thus Wieland was able to name a "Lawke" and a "Leukardis", who succeeded Katharina von Schaumberg according to parish registers, in a document of 27 June 1401. In the founding phase of the abbey it can be assumed that another abbess or administrator was already active before the minor Agnes. Similar to the tradition of the founding period of the Hof abbey, the focus on Agnes as the last member of the family group could have originated. Wieland mentions from a document of the Sonnefeld abbey from 15 September 1287, a "Rihze" and for 1357, thus after the death of Agnes, a "Reitzgk II."

The abbesses came from local noble families, the ruling Counts of Orlamünde and the Burgraviate of Nuremberg who succeeded them. Thus there are parallels to the development of the nearby Clarissan abbey of Hof, see List of abbott of Hof.

No.	Name	Term of office	Notes	Emblem
1	Agnes von Weimar-Orlamünde	until 1354	Agnes came from the family of the Counts of Weimar-Orlamünde. She was a daughter of Otto III (IV), the founder of the abbey. Her epitaph is in the church.	
2	Kunigunde von Nothaft	until 1370	Kunigunde, also called Katharina, came from the family von Nothaft.	
3	Anna von Nürnberg	1370–1383	Anna came from the family of the Franconian Hohenzollerns. She was the daughter of the Nuremberg Burgrave Johann II, who took over the rule of Plassenburg from the Counts of Orlamünde and thus also the abbey they founded. Her mother was Elisabeth von Henneberg († 1377), daughter of Berthold VII. Anna had previously been abbess in the Birkenfeld Abbey. Her epitaph is in the church.	
4	Ruth von Mosbach-Lindenfels	after 1383	Ruth came from the Mosbach-Lindenfels family.	
5	Agnes von Wallenroth	until 1409	Agnes came from the family of Wallenroth. Her epitaph is in the church.	
6	Katharina Förtsch von Thurnau	1409–1410	Katharina came from the family of Förtsch von Thurnau.	
7	Katharina Rieter	1410	Catherine came from the Rieter family. She died immediately after her appointment.	
8	Katharina von Schaumberg	1410–1411	Catherine came from the von Schaumberg family.	
9	Longa von Kotzau	1411–1428	According to the genealogist Alban von Dobeneck, Longa came from a branch von Kotzau family, which was propertied in Rehau and Leimitz and was founded by her father Goßwein. Another abbess of the family was Katharina von Kotzau in the nearby Clarissan Hof Abbey.	
10	Adelheid von Plassenberg	1428–1460	Adelheid came from the family von Plassenberg. Her epitaph is located in the church.	
11	Elisabeth von Künsberg	1460–1484	Elisabeth came from the family von Künsberg . She developed an active building activity, including the construction of the cloister. Her epitaph is located in the church.	
12	Margareta von Zedtwitz	1484–1499	Margaret came from the family von Zedtwitz. Her epitaph is located in the church.	
13	Magdalena von Wirsberg	1499–1522	Magdalena came from the family von Wirsberg. An inscription with her family coat of arms and the Redwitz coat of arms in the inner courtyard of the abbey testifies to her building activity from 1516. Her epitaph is in the church.	
14	Ottilia Schenk von Siemau	1522-1529	Ottilia came from the family of Schenk von Siemau. Her epitaph is in the church.	
15	Apollonia von Waldenfels	1529-1543	Apollonia came from the family von Waldenfels.	
16	Margarethe von Döhlau	1543-1569	Margarethe, the last abbess of Himmelkron Abbey, came from the noble family of Dölau. With Abbess Veronika von Dölau, the von Dölau family was also represented in the nearby Clarissan Abbey Hof. Since Margarethe and with her the entire abbey had converted to Protestantism, her epitaph in the church depicts her with a crucifix as a sign of the new confession instead of the previously customary crosier.	

Only a few of the nuns are known by name. Like the abbesses, a good part of them also came from the noble families of the immediate vicinity. The family von Guttenberg is frequently represented, Dobeneck and Feilitzsch can be traced with one person each.

=== Later use ===
The abbey church became a Protestant parish church in 1590. The abbey buildings served the Bayreuth margraves as Jagdschloss Himmelkron. Especially under Margrave Christian Ernst it was expanded and the cloister was partially destroyed in the process. Margrave George Wilhelm had the baroque Red Eagle Hall built, which is used by the Himmelkron parish for weddings and concerts.

In 1893, deaconesses from Neuendettelsau founded a "home for feeble-minded girls" in Himmelkron under the direction of Pastor Langheinrich. Today, the convent and the surrounding grounds house a residential home, a daycare center and a workshop for people with disabilities. The responsible body is the Diakonie Neuendettelsau.

The former nuns' choir was established as the Collegiate Church Museum.

=== Legends ===
Himmelkron Abbey is connected with the legend of the White Lady, who is said to have been a lady of Plassenburg and to have murdered her two children. According to one version of the legend, she founded the Himmelkron abbey (according to another tradition, Himmelthron Abbey) as a penance and became its first abbess. According to another version, the abbey already existed and the murdered children are said to be buried there. Kaspar Brusch, the author of the oldest written account of the legend, claims to have seen the graves of the two children in the Himmelkron abbey himself.

== Church ==
=== Exterior ===
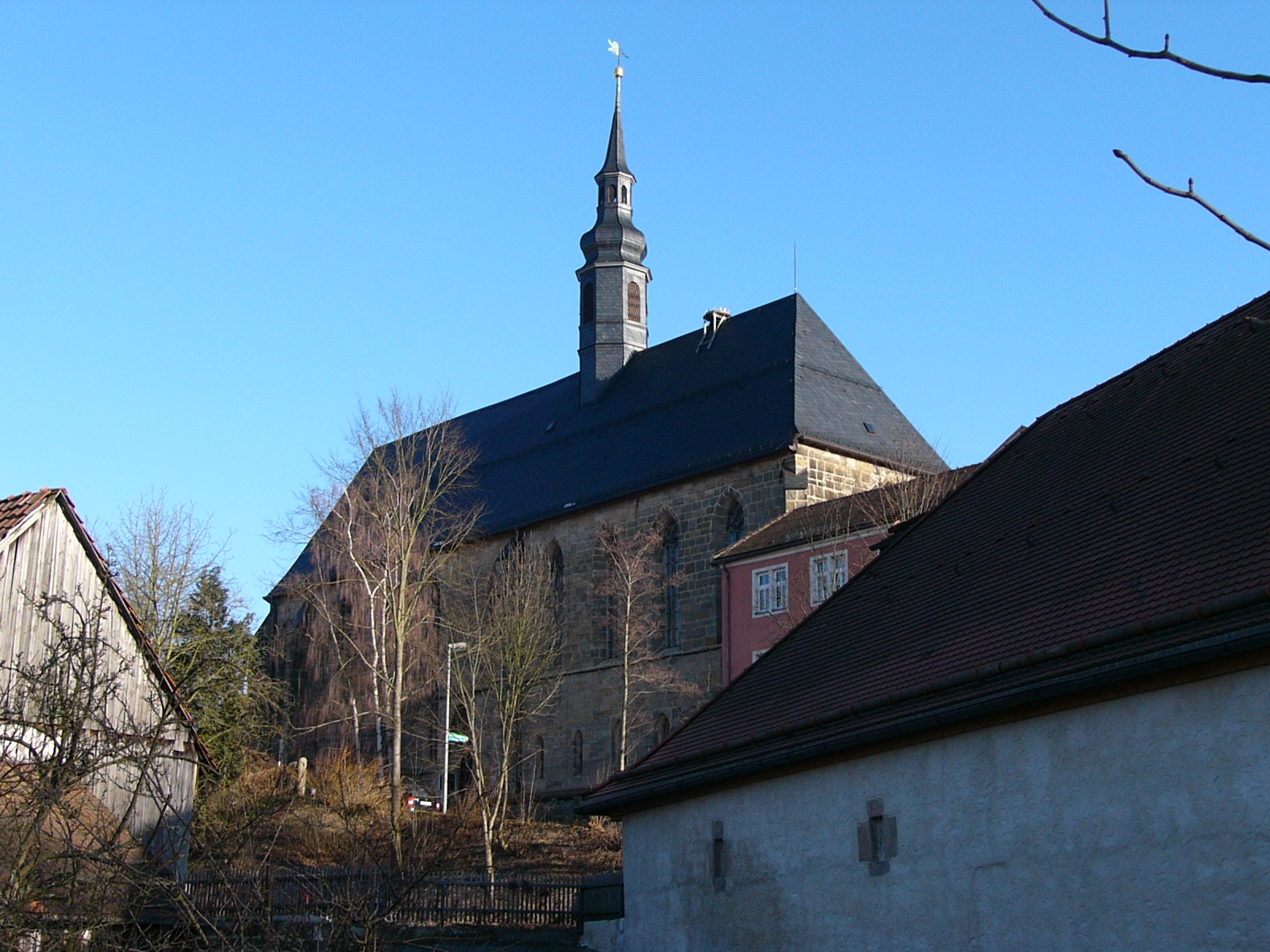
Collegiate church Himmelkron

The Gothic abbey church of St. Mary was built at the highest point within the village and towers over the village and the rest of the abbey complex. According to the rules of the order, the relatively small church had a simple exterior and instead of a tower it had a ridge turret.

Despite the Baroque overhaul in the Margrave period, the Gothic stylistic elements of the building are clearly recognizable. On the outside, a structural peculiarity is recognizable: the chancel and the nave in the east, which extend over the entire height of the church, are followed in the west half by a crypt at ground level and above it the nuns' choir. This can be seen from the outside by the fact that in the eastern part (to the left of the entrance portal on the north side) of the church the lancet windows extend over the entire height of the church, while the western part (to the right of the entrance portal) is divided horizontally by a cornice. Under the cornice there are seven lower lancet windows belonging to the crypt, above them five higher lancet windows of the nuns' choir.

=== Collegiate church - parish church ===
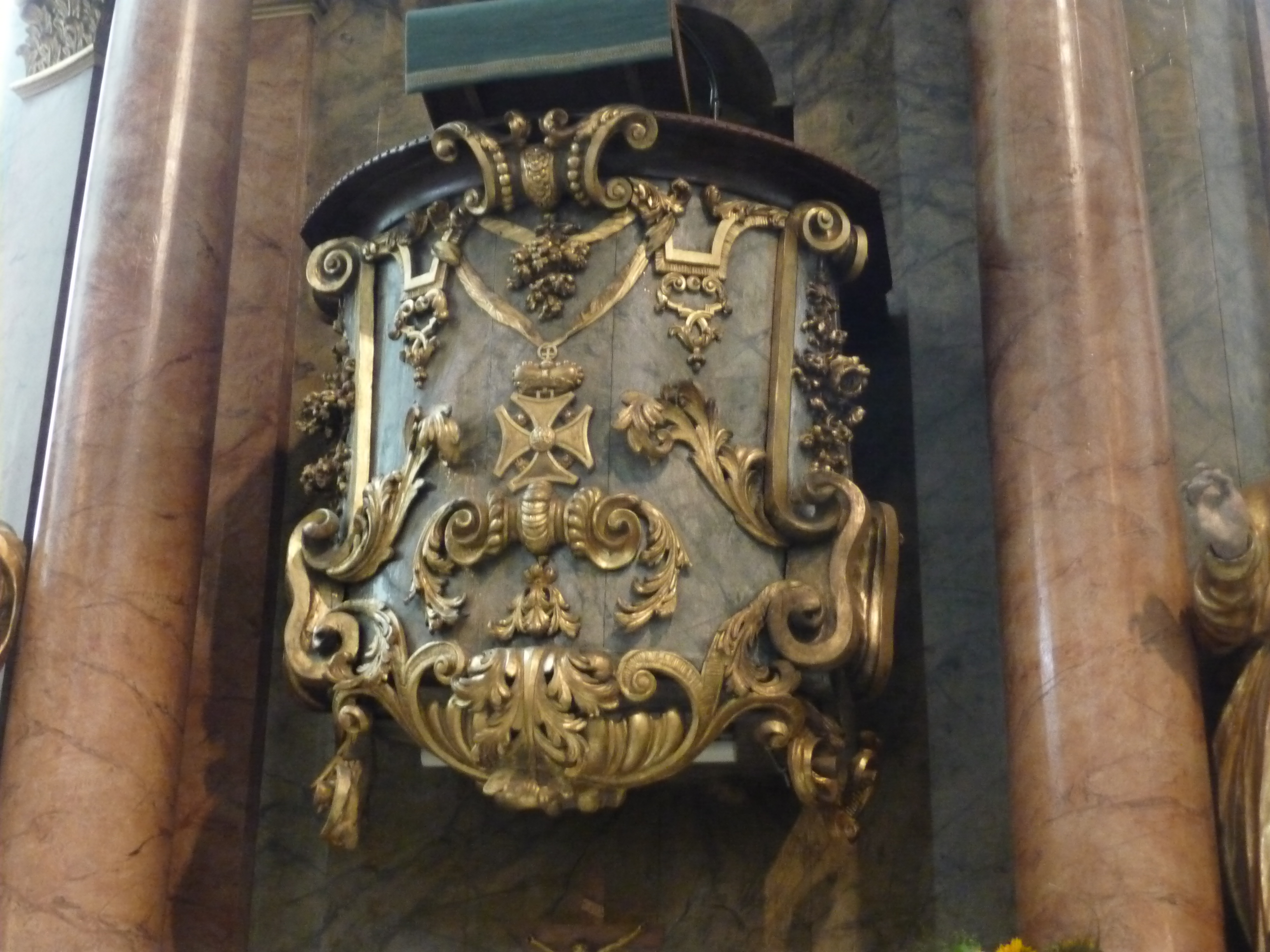
Pulpit in baroque pulpit altar

Starting in 1698, the northern Italian architect Antonio della Porta fundamentally rebuilt the church. The remodeling, which was carried out due to the new Lutheran principles of form, can be classified in the Baroque and Rococo styles. In a local expression, the incipient Margraviate style is evident. The windows were widened, the original Gothic Wimperg at the main portal was removed, the Margravial coat of arms took the place of a figure of the Virgin Mary, and an Olivet group at the outer chancel was removed. The flat ceiling of the nave was vaulted, the two-story gallery was built (it was the first church gallery where the columns are continuous from the floor to the second floor), and the floor was leveled. In 1718 the pulpit altar was made.

In the chancel, isolated traces give clues to the earlier decoration of the church. The middle choir window has a stained glass from the 14th century. The remnant of a 15th-century wall painting depicts the Veronica's veil. In the early 1990s, restoration work in the floor of the choir found more stone slabs with frescoes, which are exhibited in the Collegiate Church Museum. These include a figural representation that has been fixed to the wall in the cloister for some time. Also from the monastic period are the piscina behind the altar and a crucifix from around 1470.

=== Crypt - Knight Chapel ===
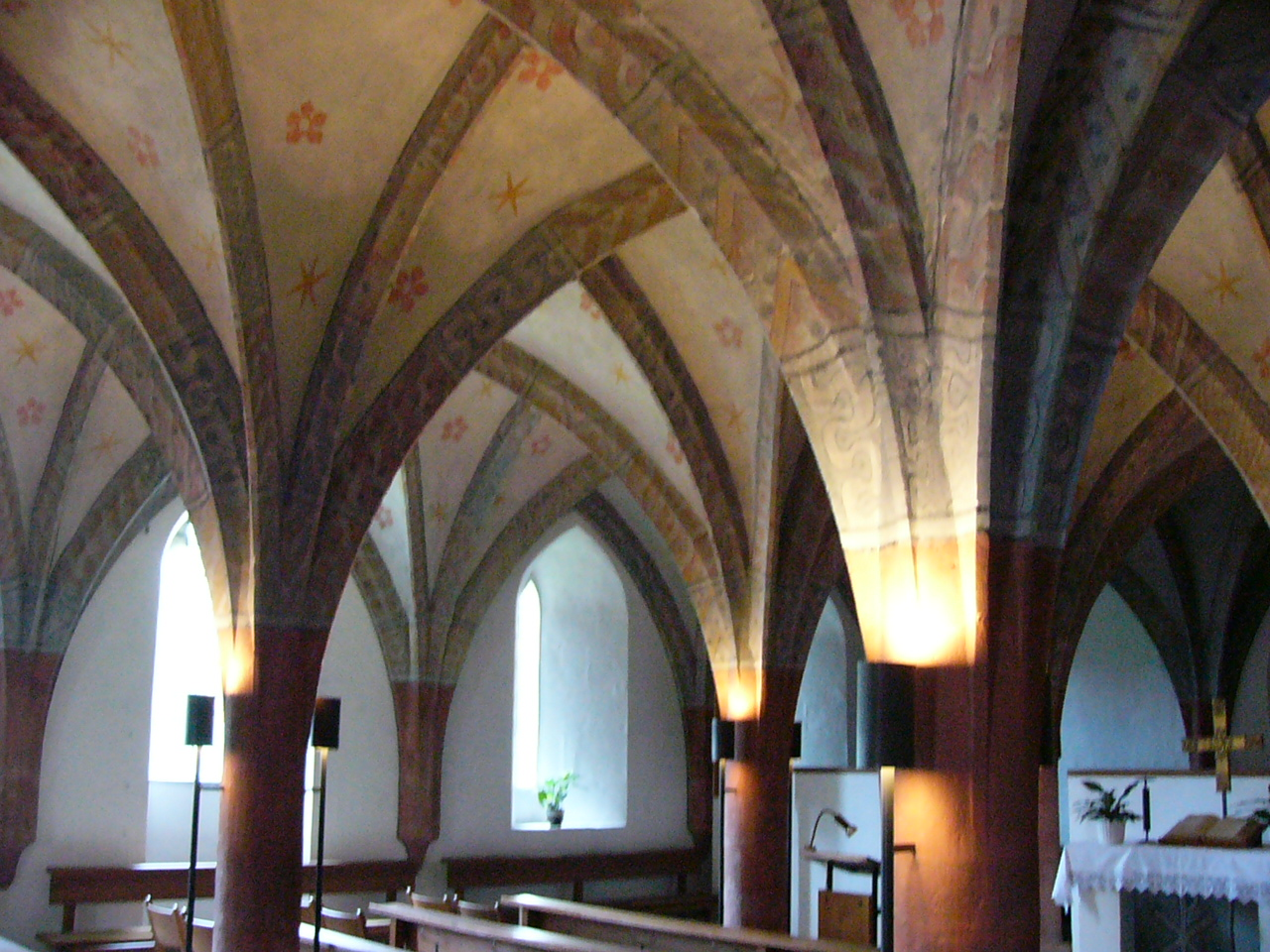
Knight's Chapel

The ground-level section in the west of the church was probably originally laid out as the burial place of the Counts of Orlamünde. The high tomb of the abbey founder Otto III (IV) of Orlamünde († 1285) has been preserved. In addition, sarcophagi of some margraves of the principality of Bayreuth from the House of Hohenzollern are placed there. Therefore, the crypt was called "Prince's crypt". There are:

- the sarcophagus of Margrave George Frederick Charles († 1735),
- the sarcophagus of Prince Christian Heinrich († 1708, buried in Himmelkron in 1738),
- the sarcophagus of Prince Albrecht Wolfgang (fallen 1734, buried 1742) and
- the sarcophagus of Margrave Friedrich Christian († 1769).

Today, the crypt is called the Knight's Chapel and is used as a devotional space for the Day Care Center for the Disabled. A small area adjacent to the nave with the sarcophagi of the margraves is divided by a partition wall that does not reach the ceiling. Most of the room is used for devotions and ceremonies and is furnished accordingly. The vault ends with ornate keystones, which have coats of arms of local noble families in rounded form and other colored ornaments, including a pentagram, as a motif.

=== Nuns' choir - Collegiate church museum ===
In the nuns' choir and in a neighboring room of the former convent, St. John's parlor, the Collegiate Church Museum has been located since 1987. Among other things, textiles and liturgical utensils from the 16th to 18th centuries are exhibited there, as well as an Olivet group from the convent period and an altar shrine. Painted stone slabs once used as wall decorations are also on display, which later served as floor slabs in the abbey church.

=== Epitaphs ===
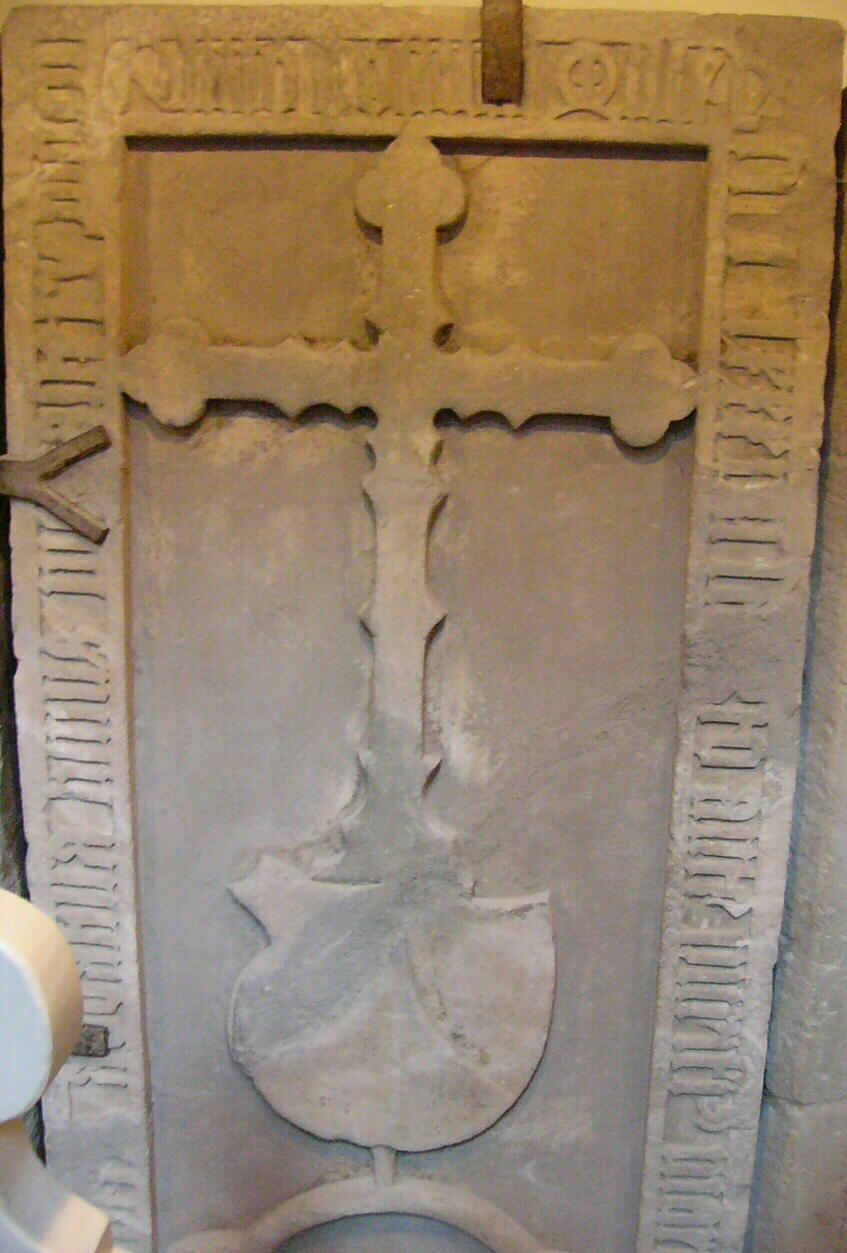
Epitaph of Elisabeth von Künsberg

In addition to other epitaphs, especially from the 17th and 18th centuries, including those for teachers and priests, there are surviving grave monuments of the Counts of Orlamünde and also of lesser noble Franconian knights, many of whom were free of riches. There are a total of four epitaphs from the burial place of the Counts of Orlamünde. The unknown artist of the elaborate Orlamünde funerary monuments is called Wolfskeelmeister. Several abbesses were buried in the abbey, nine epitaphs of them are placed in the church. There are also other epitaphs under the church floor, of which more detailed descriptions are available. For example, the epitaph of Margarethe von Wiesenthau with the parental coats of arms Wiesenthau and Sparneck serves as the foundation of a column.

==== Abbots ====
- Epitaph of Agnes von Weimar-Orlamünde
- Epitaph of Anna von Nuremberg († 1383)
- Epitaph of Agnes von Wallenroth († 1409)
- Epitaph of Adelheid von Plassenberg († 1460)
- Epitaph of Elisabeth von Künsberg († 1484)
- Epitaph of Margaret von Zedtwitz († 1499)
- Epitaph of Magdalena von Wirsberg († 1522)
- Epitaph of Ottilia Schenk von Siemau († 1529)
- Epitaph of Margarethe of Döhlau († 1569)

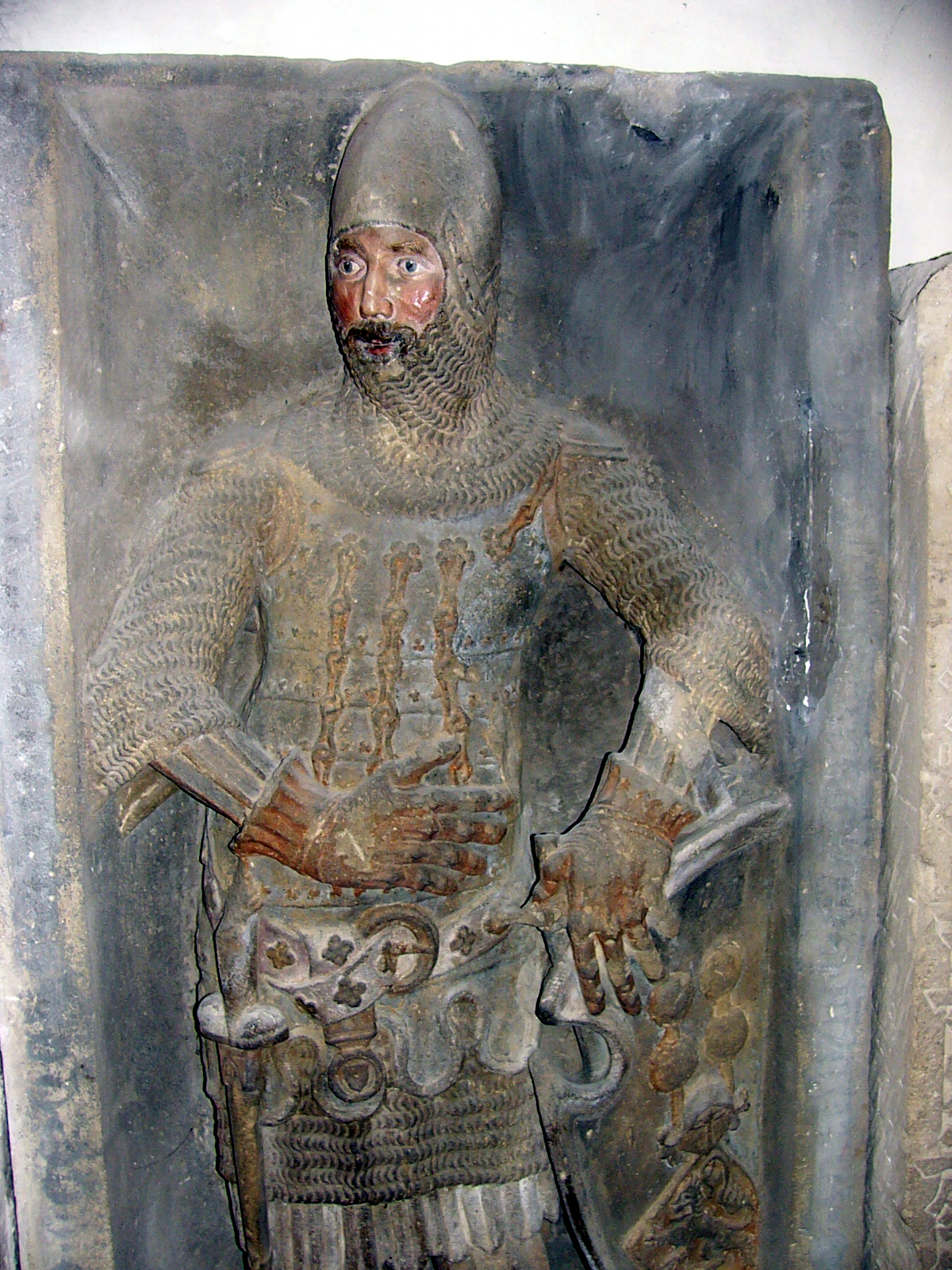
Epitaph of Otto VI (VII) of Orlamünde

==== Local nobility and early high nobility ====
- Oldest epitaph of the church with two coats of arms (unicorn, triskele, probably Waldenfels - Rabensteiner zu Döhlau, 13th century)
- Epitaph of a Count of Hirschberg (around 1280)
- Epitaph of a knight Förtsch von Thurnau (around 1300)
- Epitaph for Count Otto VI (VII) of Orlamünde († 1340)
- Epitaph of an unknown Count of Orlamünde (around 1360)
- Epitaph for knight Hans von Künsberg († 1470)
- Epitaph for knight Heinrich von Künsberg († 1473)
- Epitaph for Ursula von Wirsberg († 1510) with coats of arms of Wirsberg and Biberern
- Epitaph for knight Sebastian von Wirsberg zu Glashütten († 1523)
- Epitaph for knight Sigmund of Wirsberg († 1543)
- Epitaph with coat of arms Streitberg/Wallenrode (1965 recovered from the knight's chapel)

== Cloister ==
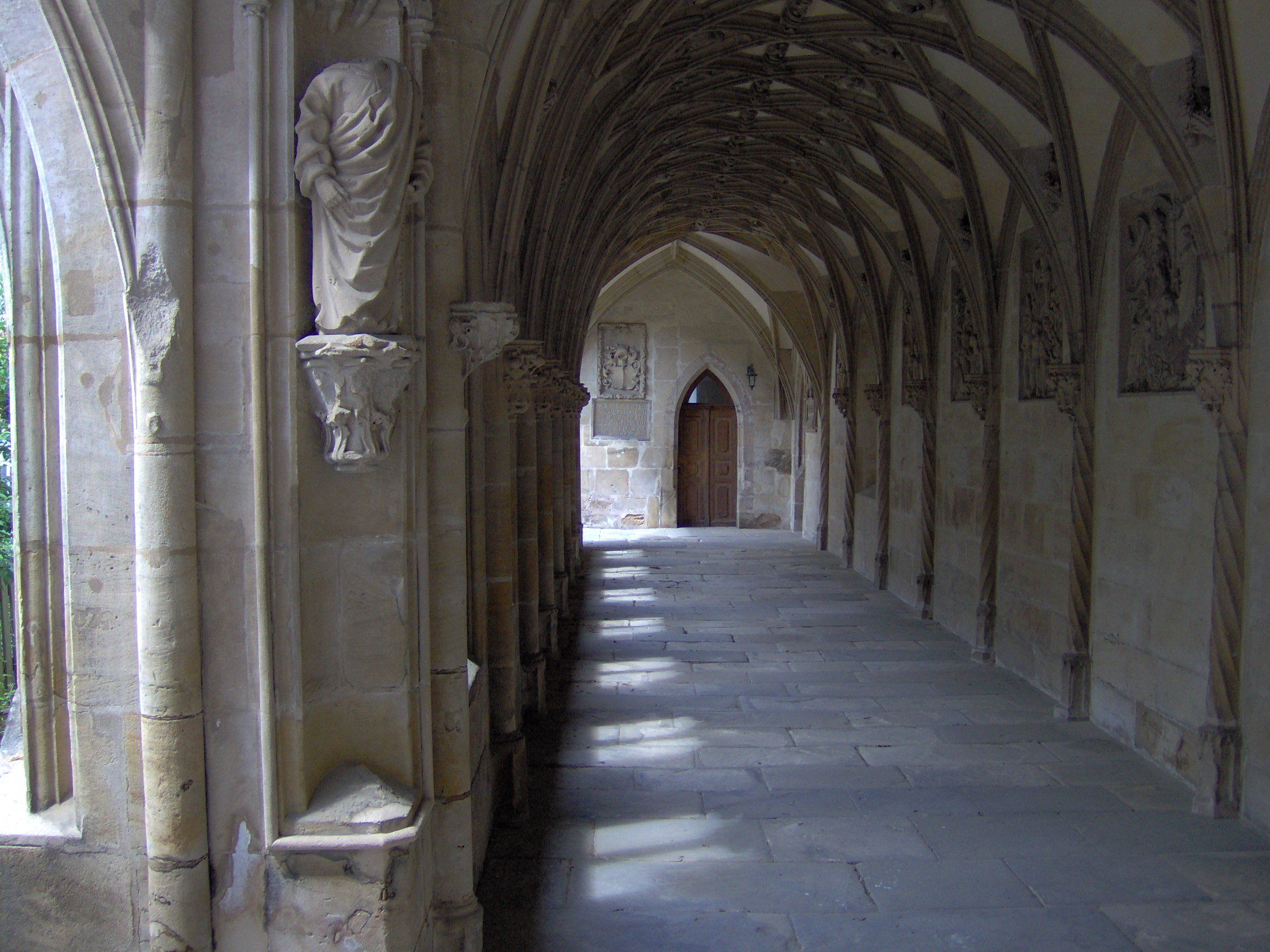
The preserved wing of the cloister

A preserved wing of the Gothic cloister adjoins the southern outer wall of the collegiate church in the former courtyard of the abbey.

The foundation stone for the cloister was laid on 30 July 1473, on the initiative of Abbess Elisabeth von Künsberg. Around 1750, the removal of the cloister began. Three cloister wings fell victim to the pickaxe. The parish priest at the time personally lobbied the margrave for the preservation of the cloister and was thus able to protect the still existing wing. However, in 1835 stone figures from the cloister were sold, and it was only due to negligence that a prophet figure was forgotten during its removal. In the years 1886 to 1890 and from 1959 to 1969 the cloister was restored.

=== Sandstone reliefs ===
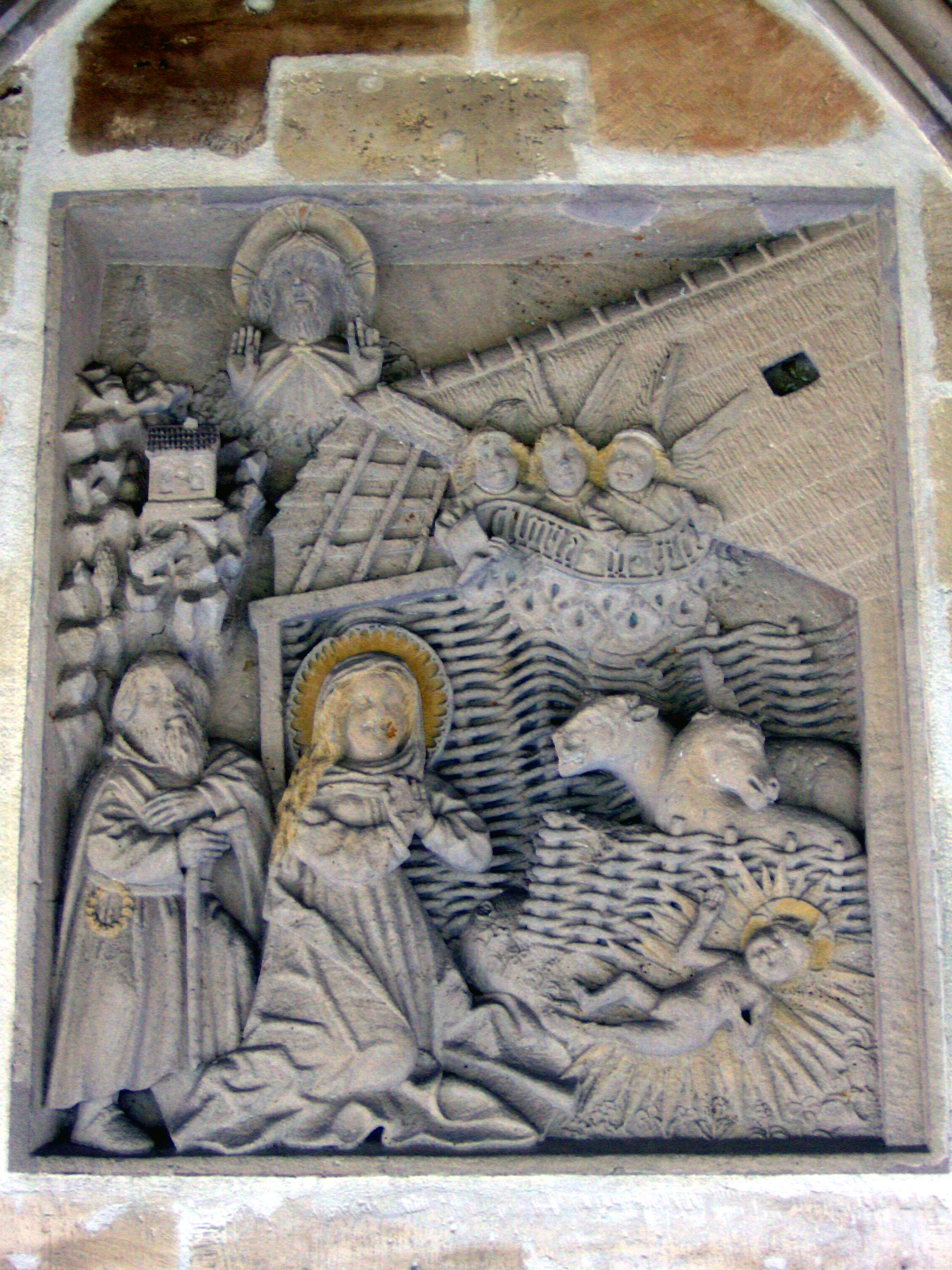
Birth of Christ on a sandstone relief slab

In the western corner yoke of the cloister, a sandstone relief with a coat of arms and a plaque commemorate the construction of the cloister under Elisabeth von Künsberg. In the north wall of the cloister, which is at the same time the outer wall of the collegiate church, seven further reliefs made of sandstone are embedded, which served the nuns for meditation. Depicted are core statements of the Christian faith, as they are contained in the Credo (Creed) of all Christian denominations: the Creation myth, the Annunciation to Mary, the Birth of Christ, his Crucifixion, Resurrection and Feast of Ascension. The works were created in 1460-1470 and probably had woodcuts as models, which were only slightly older. There are similar representations in other places. In the eastern corner yoke is the depiction of Jesus as the Man of Sorrows.

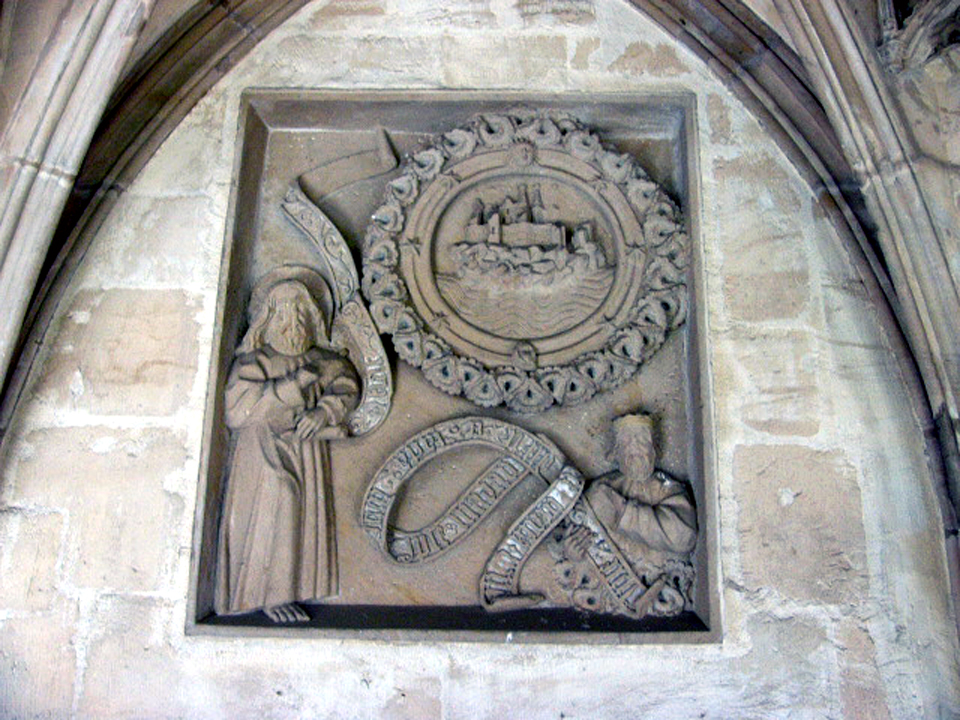
Sandstone relief with depiction of creation

In the sandstone relief with the representation of the creation God stands on the left as creator of the world. "Fiat" (let it be, let it be done, let it be created) he speaks according to the Latin banner. The crowned man on the lower right points with his hand to God and his creation and speaks according to the banner, which, as is often the case with stone carvings, uses abbreviations: "Ipse dixit et facta sunt, ipse ma[n]dav[it] et creata sunt" (he spoke, and it happened; he commanded, and it was created, from Psalm 33, verse 9 in the Old Testament). In the Middle Ages it was assumed that King David wrote the Psalms, therefore he is probably the person depicted. Above, the world created by God can be seen in symbolic condensation and abbreviation, as it was imagined according to the pre-Copernican, geocentric model valid at that time, because the depictions were probably created already around 1460/70. In the center is the flat Earth inhabited by man, for which symbolically stands a city (see also New Jerusalem). The sculptor did not attach importance to an exact spatial representation, he was concerned with symbolism, with a statement of faith, therefore the city or the earth disk can be seen from the side, as well as the world sea, which surrounds it and sets a limit to the human world. The earth and with it also the human being stood in the center of the universe, which one imagined as several, at last as nine concentric (glass) spheres, on which the planets moved, while on the outermost one the fixed stars were fixed (see also cosmology of the Middle Ages). Behind it ended the world, the creation, and began the sphere of God. The relief gives the starry sky very simplified: as two circles with the sun and the moon and six stars.

=== Vault ===
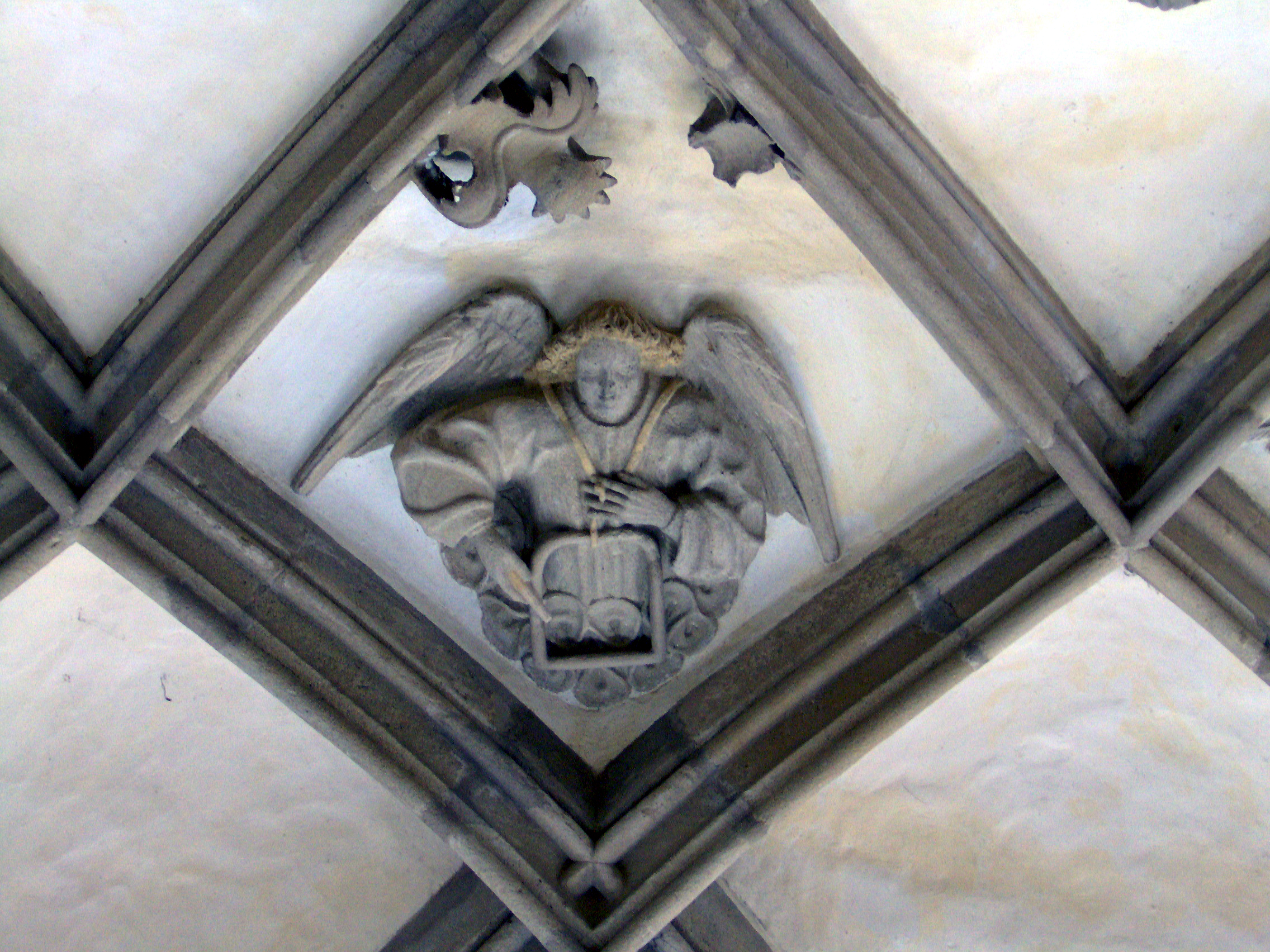
Angel playing music in a net field of the vault

The barrel vault over the cloister with its applied reticulated ribwork comprises seven bays between two corner bays. In fields between the ribs, 26 angels are depicted, 19 of whom play music on various instruments. The musical instruments are oriented to the theme of the sandstone reliefs; for example, at the height of the depiction of hell, the bell is struck to chase away evil spirits. The musical instruments depicted, some of which are no longer in use today, are monochord, three-hole pipe with tabor, portative, lute, psaltery, vielle, trumpet, triangle, rattles, shawm, slide trumpet, timpani, bugle, handbell, dulcimer, hurdy-gurdy, harp and bagpipe. An instrument after the angel with the lute is no longer recognizable. As a conclusion, King David is depicted with a crown, opposite him the prophet Isaiah. Their banners reflect the motto of the Angel Concert. Translation: "Praise him with timpani and round dance." (Ps. 140,4) and "Rejoice and sing praises ..." (Is. 12,6) A heavenly choir, which probably, as Meissner assumes, refers to the name of the abbey.

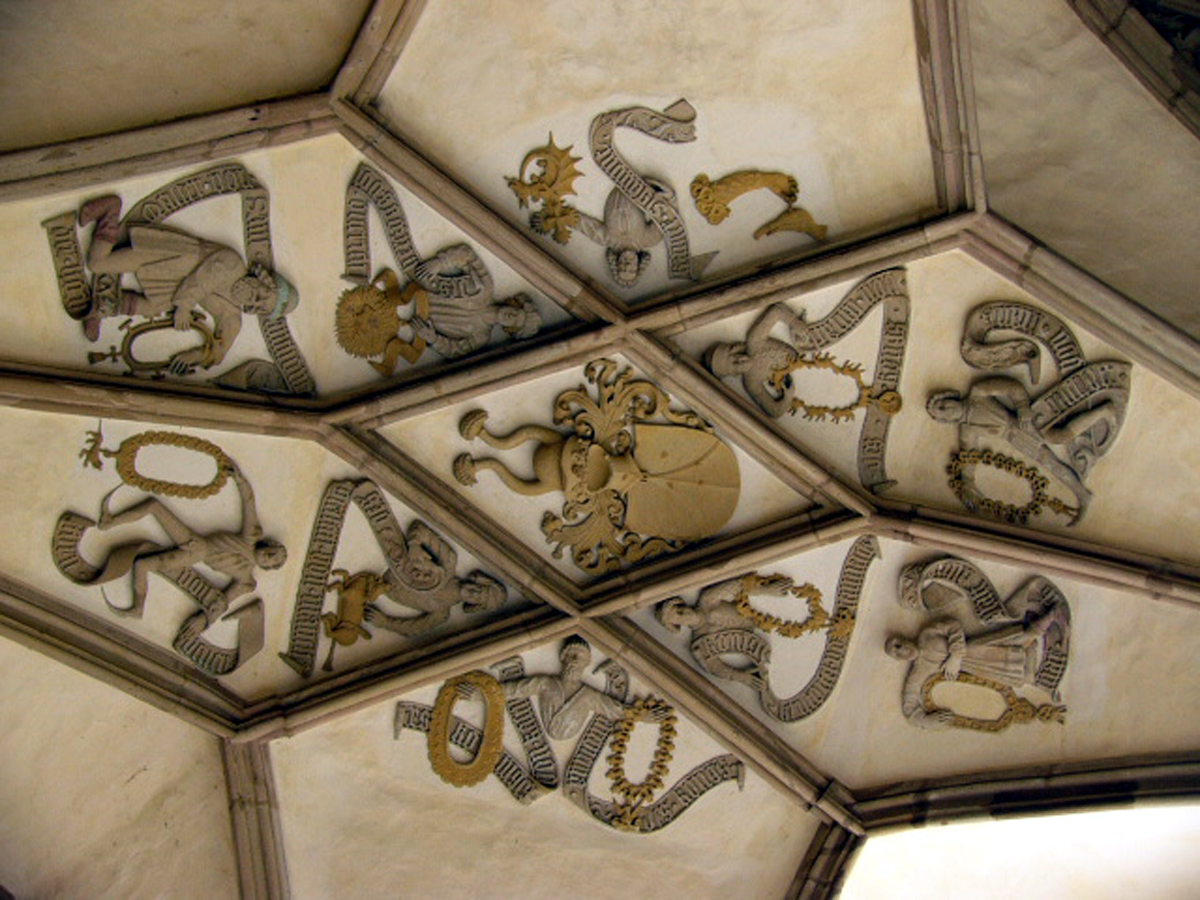
Künsberg coat of arms and order affiliations in a corner yoke

At the end of the cloister, the coat of arms of Künsberg is mounted in the ceiling vault, surrounded by 16 representations symbolizing religious affiliations. According to the current state of research by Werner Bergmann[24], these are religious affiliations of a male member of the Künsberg family. This person was in the closest family relationship to the abbess Elisabeth and was an influential retainer of the margraves. The 16 signs of the order show connections to the whole European area, including Spain, Denmark and Hungary. Among the order representations are the Society of the King of Spain, the Order of the Livonian Brothers of the Sword, the Society of the Bishop of Mainz (probably by Diether von Isenburg), the Order of the Swan of the Margraves of Brandenburg, the Society of King Christopher III, the Danish Order of the Elephant, the Society of the Duchy of Mantua (probably Ludovico Gonzaga), the Order of the Dragon, the Society of the Eagle (founded by Duke Albrecht V of Austria), the Society of the Duke of Austria, the Order of the Scale, the Order of the Jar, the Society of the Prince of Hesse, the Society of the King of England, the Society of the King of Navarre and the Society of the Grand Master of Saint Anthony. Each order is represented by a figure, the Order Herald, who holds the Order ribbon with Order medallion and is provided with a banner on which each Order is written with its most original name.

=== Devil's Ground ===
The so-called devil's ground above the cloister shows animal figures made of sandstone, which, according to medieval belief, were supposed to keep evil spirits away. There is also a legend of a nun who is said to have been walled in alive up there.

== Abbey building ==
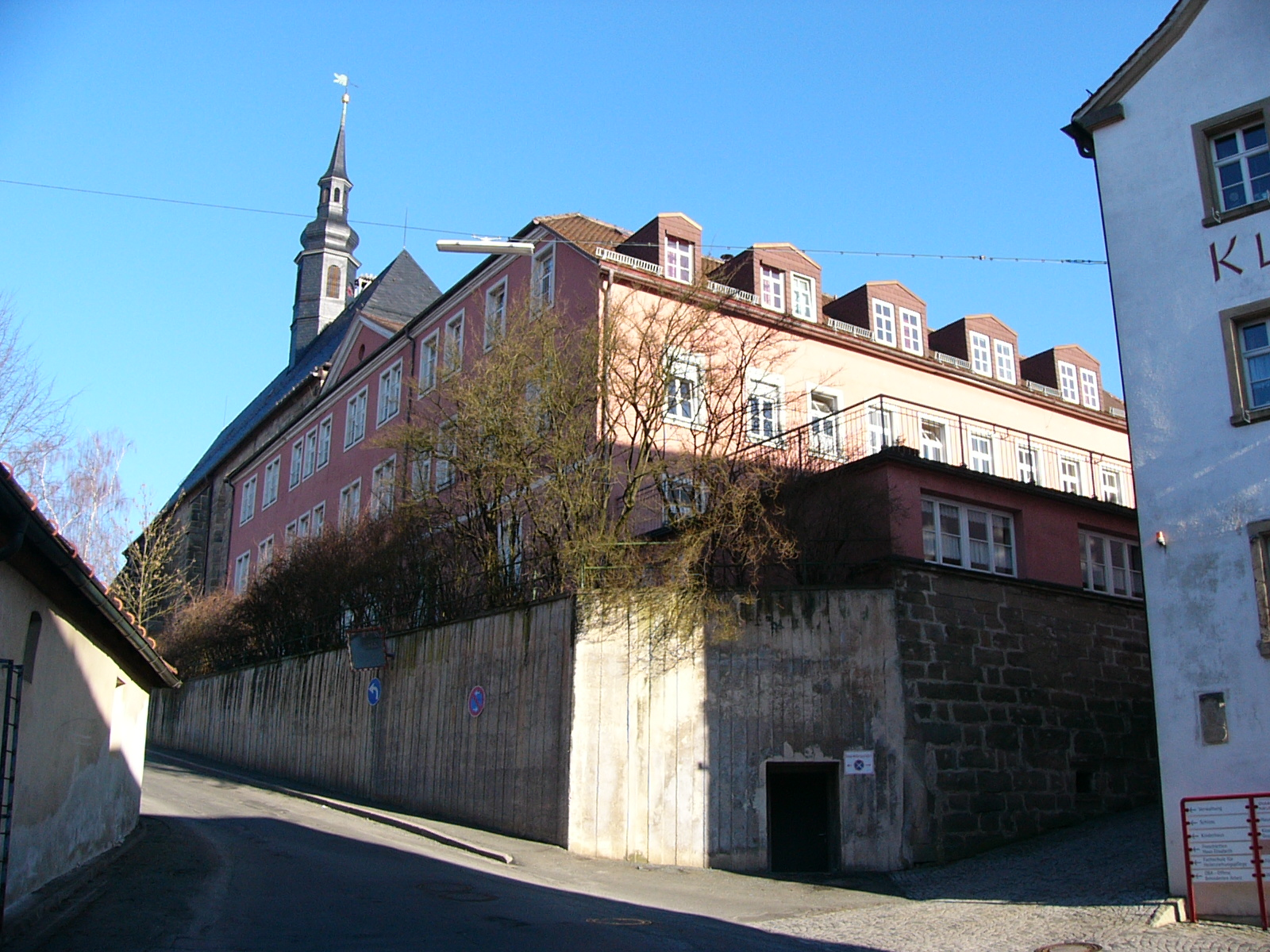
Exterior view from northwest

The former abbey buildings, which were largely renovated in the 16th to 18th centuries, are grouped around two courtyards.

The starting point of the abbey building is today's Upper Courtyard, in which, similar to the original layout of Sonnefeld Abbey, the collegiate church is inserted northward into the abbey quadrangle. Under the abbess Elisabeth von Künsberg the cloister was built in it, of which only one wing has been preserved.

The much larger Lower Court was only gradually extended to a more or less closed area, beginning with the buildings of Abbess Magdalena von Wirsberg up to the time of the margraves. The long construction phase explains the irregular ground plan and the open peripheral buildings of the courtyard. The use of the buildings as a hunting lodge led to the construction of another long building wing in the south of the second courtyard in the margrave period, in which the Red Eagle Hall is located.

== Bibliography ==
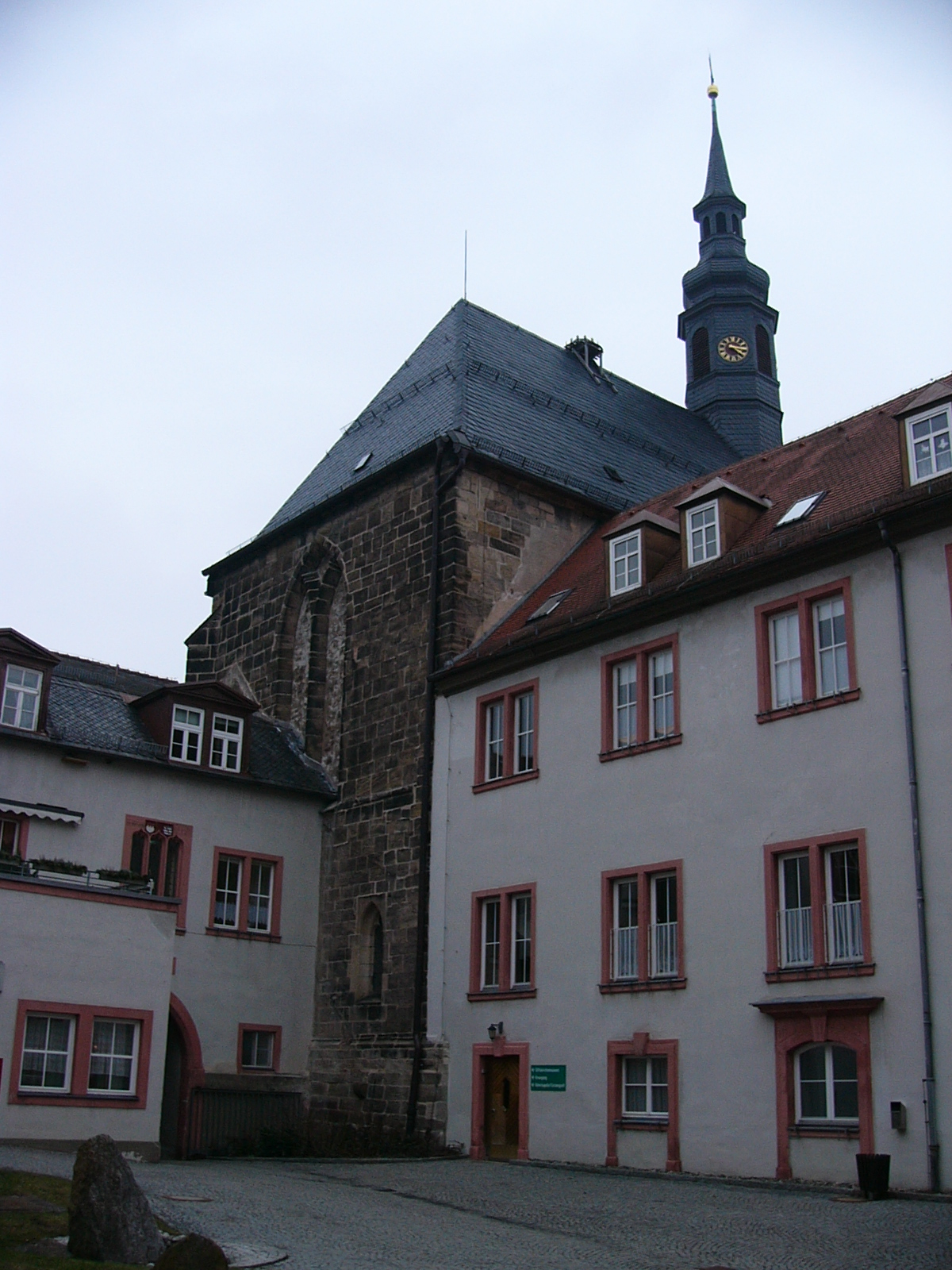
North corner of the lower court

- Werner Bergmann (2001), Bund Deutscher Ordenssammler - Deutsche Gesellschaft für Ordenskunde e.V. (ed.), "Rätsel um ein altes Deckengewölbe", Orden und Ehrenzeichen – Das Magazin für Sammler und Forscher (Auf der Suche nach neuen Erkenntnissen zu 16 spätmittelalterlichen Ordenszeichen), Hof, pp. 22–30
- Alexander Johann Bilabel (1881), "Beiträge zur Geschichte des ehemaligen Klosters Himmelkron", Archiv für Geschichte und Alterthumskunde von Oberfranken, vol. 15, no. 2, Bayreuth, pp. 275–317
- Johann Kaspar Bundschuh (1800), "Himmelkron, Himmelcron", Geographisches Statistisch-Topographisches Lexikon von Franken (Geographical Statistical-Topographic Lexicon of Franconia) (in German), vol. 2: El–H, Ulm: Verlag der Stettinischen Buchhandlung, OCLC 833753081, 790364298
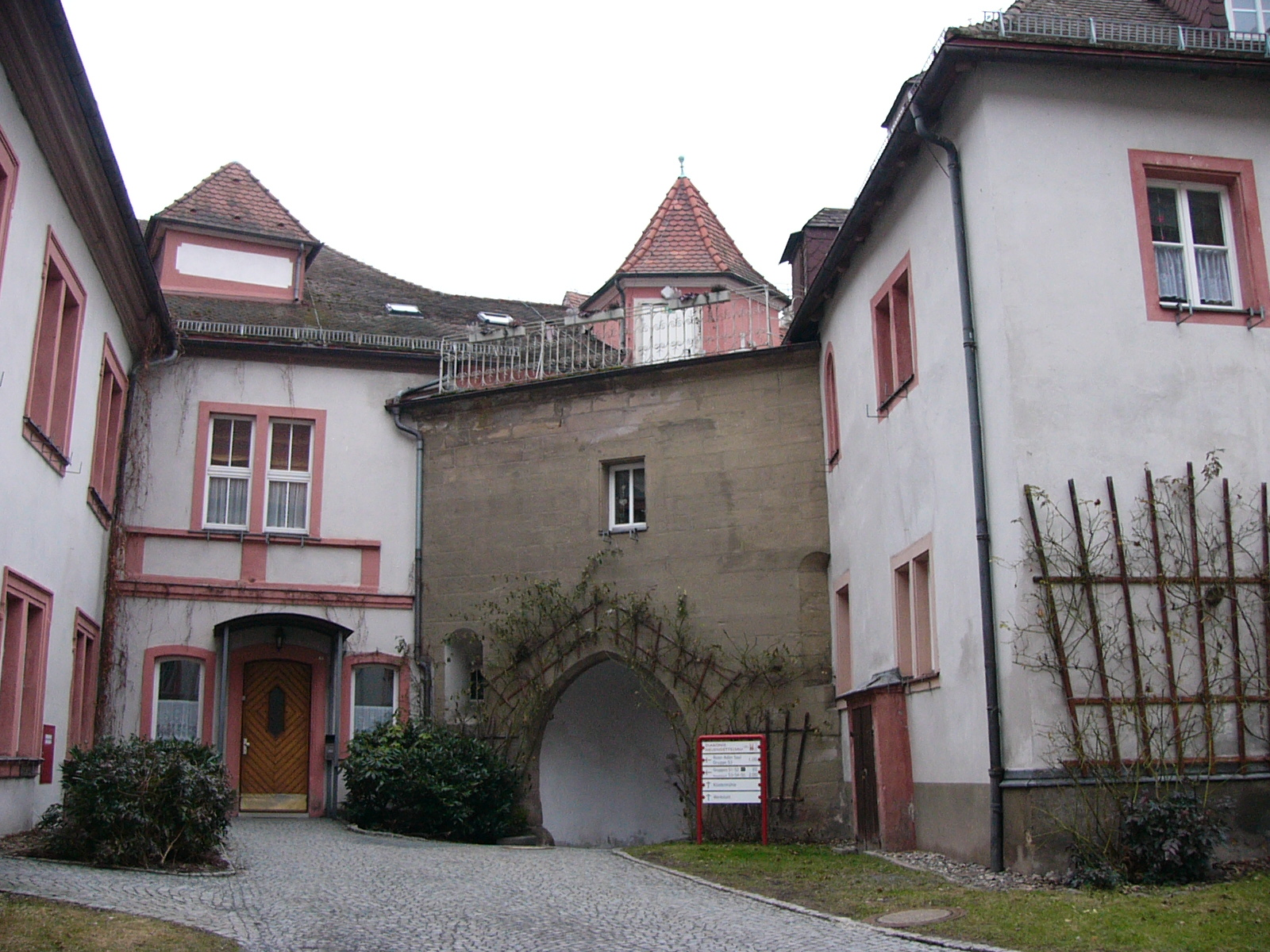
  South corner of the lower court
- August Gebeßler: Stadt und Landkreis Kulmbach (= Bayerische Kunstdenkmale. Band 3). Deutscher Kunstverlag, München 1958, DNB 451450973, pp. 53–59.
- Annett Haberlah-Pohl: Münchberg. Der Altlandkreis (= Historischer Atlas von Bayern, Teil Franken. I, 39). Kommission für bayerische Landesgeschichte, München 2011, ISBN 978-3-7696-6556-7, pp. 47 ff.
- Joachim Hotz (1982), "Zisterzienserklöster in Oberfranken", Große Kunstführer, vol. 98, München, Zürich: Schnell und Steiner, pp. 71–80, ISBN 3-7954-0842-3
- Ernst Kießkalt (1909), Die Bildwerke des ehemaligen Zistercienserinnen-Klosters Himmelkron, Bayreuth
- Johann Loer (1911), "Kurtze Beschreibung des löblichen Jungkfrawen-Closters HimelCron, am Fluß des Mains bei Culmbach uffm Gebierg gelegen", Archiv für Geschichte und Alterthumskunde von Oberfranken, vol. 24, no. 3, Bayreuth, pp. 1–20 (Hinweise dazu)
- Helmuth Meißner (1972), Colloquium Hist. Wirsbergense (ed.), "500 Jahre Klosterkreuzgang Himmelkron", Geschichte am Obermain, vol. Bd. 8 (1973/74), Lichtenfels
- Helmuth Meißner (1974), Historischer Verein für Oberfranken e.V. (ed.), "Der Klosterkreuzgang Himmelkron", Archiv für Geschichte von Oberfranken (Geschichte und Beschreibung), vol. 54, Bayreuth, pp. 5–84, ISSN 0066-6335
- Helmuth Meißner (1979), Himmelkron (Geschichte und Geschichten, Namen und Daten), Himmelkron
- Helmuth Meißner (1998), Stiftskirche, ehemaliges Kloster und Schloss Himmelkron ((Große Baudenkmäler, Heft 245)) (5. ed.), München/Berlin: Deutscher Kunstverlag
- Helmuth Meißner (2003), Historischer Verein für Oberfranken e.V. (ed.), "Wappendarstellungen in und um das ehemalige Kloster Himmelkron", Archiv für Geschichte von Oberfranken, vol. 83, Bayreuth, pp. 223–259, ISSN 0066-6335
- Helmuth Meißner (2005), Historischer Verein für Oberfranken e.V. (ed.), "Wappendarstellungen in Himmelkron", Archiv für Geschichte von Oberfranken, vol. 85, Bayreuth, pp. 175–192, ISSN 0066-6335
- Helmuth Meißner (2006), Historischer Verein für Oberfranken e.V. (ed.), "Die Orlamünde-Epitaphien in Himmelkron", Archiv für Geschichte von Oberfranken, vol. 86, Bayreuth, pp. 93–108, ISSN 0066-6335
- Karl Müssel (1979), "Des Himmels Krone am Weißen Main", Unser Bayern - Heimatbeilage der Bayerischen Staatszeitung (Schicksal und Wandel eines Zisterzienserinnenklosters), vol. Jahrg. 28, no. 9., pp. 69–71
- Hans Roser (1988), Klöster in Franken, Freiburg: Eulen Verlag, pp. 229–232, ISBN 3-89102-108-9
- Johann Ernst Teichmann (1739), Historische Beschreibung des alten Frauen-Closters Himmelcron, Bayreuth, URN: nbn:de:bvb:12-bsb10006661-7
- M. Wieland (1903), Das Zisterzienserinnenkloster Himmelkron, Bregenz
- Friedrich August Zinck (1900), Historischer Verein für Oberfranken e.V. (ed.), "Einiges Neues aus Himmelkron", Archiv für Geschichte und Alterthumskunde von Oberfranken, vol. 21, no. 2, Bayreuth, pp. 49–56, ISSN 0066-6335
- Theodor Zinck (1925), Himmelkron (Beschreibung seiner Vergangenheit und Gegenwart), Bayreuth
