= Herman II of Weimar-Orlamünde =

Count of Weimar-Orlamünde

Herman II, Count of Weimar-Orlamünde
- Born: c. 1184
- Died: 27 December 1247
- Noble family: House of Ascania
- Spouse: Beatrix of Andechs-Merania
- Issue: Hermann III; Otto III
- Father: Siegfried III, Count of Weimar-Orlamünde
- Mother: Sophie of Denmark

Herman II, Count of Weimar-Orlamünde (c. 1184 – 27 December 1247) was a member of the House of Ascania. He ruled the County of Weimar-Orlamünde from 1206 until his death.

== Life ==
He was the youngest son of Count Siegfried III (c. 1155 – 1206) and his wife Sophie (1159 – c. 1208), a daughter of King Valdemar I of Denmark.

After his father died in 1206, Hermann II ruled Weimar-Orlamünde jointly with his brother Albert II. He came increasingly into conflict with Landgrave Herman I of Thuringia, who occupied Schauenforst Castle between Orlamünde and Rudolstadt. In 1214, Herman of Thuringia took Herman of Weimar-Orlamünde prisoner at Weimar Castle. Landgrave Louis IV of Thuringia also fought against the brothers Herman and Albert. Despite the continuing troubles with Thuringia, Herman II managed to expand his territorial sovereignty. He founded the city of Weimar and a Cistercian monastery at Oberweimar. In the conflict between the Houses of Guelph and Hohenstaufen, he sided with the Hohenstaufen. His never-ending feuds eventually caused the downfall of his dynasty. The areas around the two main towns remained separate territories and so it was logical that around 1265 his sons Herman III and Otto III divided the county into two almost independent counties of Weimar and Orlamünde.

== Marriage and issue ==
Herman II married Princess Beatrix of Andechs-Merania, the daughter of Duke Otto I of Merania. She was the heir to the Lordship of Plassenburg, including Kulmbach and Mittleberg, and to the Lordship of Berneck, including Goldkronach, meinau, Wirsberg, Pretzendorf, Zwernitz Castle and Trebgast. Herman II and Beatrix had the following children:

- Herman "the Elder", was a clergyman
- Herman III (c. 1230 – c. 1283), inherited Orlamünde
- Otto III "the Magnificent" (c. 1236 – 13 May 1285), married Agnes of Truhendingen (c. 1230/1240 – c. 1300), inherited Weimar, Rudolstadt and Plassenburg
- Sophie, married in 1259 to Count Henry VIII of Weida (c. 1238 – 17 September 1280)
- Otto "the Younger", canon at Würzburg from 1265 to 1308

== Sources ==
- Lyon, Jonathan R. (2013). Princely Brothers and Sisters: The Sibling Bond in German Politics, 1100-1250. Cornell University Press.

Herman II of Weimar-Orlamünde House of Ascania Born: c. 1184 Died: 27 December 1247
Preceded by Siegfried III	Count of Weimar-Orlamünde; 1206–1247	Succeeded by Otto III as Count of Weimar
Preceded by Siegfried III	Count of Weimar-Orlamünde; 1206–1247	Succeeded by Herman III as Count of Orlamünde
