= Beatrice of Merania =

13th-century German Noblewoman

Beatrix of Merania
- Born: 1210
- Died: 9 February 1271
- Noble family: House of Andechs
- Spouse: Herman II, Count of Weimar-Orlamünde
- Father: Otto I, Duke of Merania
- Mother: Beatrice II, Countess of Burgundy

Beatrix of Merania (1210 – 9 February 1271) was a princess of Merania by birth, and the Countess of Weimar-Orlamünde by marriage.

Beatrix was the daughter of Otto I, Duke of Merania and Beatrice II, Countess of Burgundy.

She was an heiress to Plassenburg Castle, with Kulmbach and Mittelberg and the Lordship of Berneck, including Goldkronach, Meinau, Wirsberg, Pretzendorf (now called Himmelkron), Zwernitz Castle and Trebgast.

== Marriage and issue ==
She was married to Herman II, Count of Weimar-Orlamünde. They had the following children:

- Herman "the Elder", was a clergyman
- Herman III (c. 1230 – 1283), inherited Orlamünde
- Albert III (d. 1293)
- Otto III "the Magnificent" (c. 1236 – 13 May 1285), married Anges of Leiningen (c. 1230/1240 – c. 1300), inherited Weimar, Rudolstadt and Plassenburg
- Sophie, married in 1259 to Count Henry VIII of Weida (c. 1238 – 17 September 1280)
- Otto "the Younger", canon at Würzburg from 1265 to 1308
