= Otto III of Weimar-Orlamünde =

German nobleman (1244-1285)

Otto III, Count of Weimar-Orlamünde
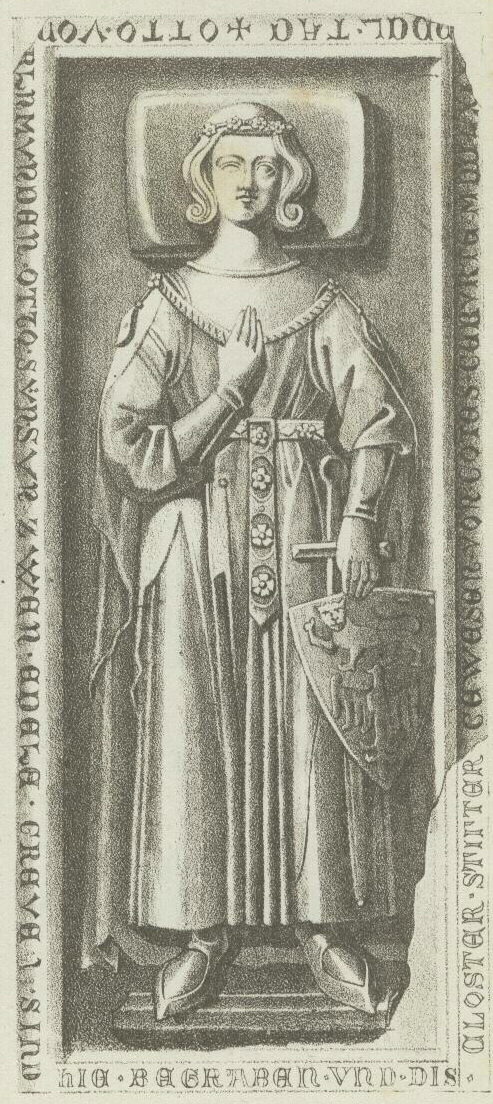
- Grave stone for Counts Otto III and Otto V (d. 1315) in Himmelkron Abbey
- Born: 1244
- Died: June 1285 (aged 40–41)
- Buried: Himmelkron Abbey in Himmelkron
- Noble family: House of Ascania
- Spouse: Agnes of Truhendingen
- Father: Herman II, Count of Weimar-Orlamünde
- Mother: Beatrix of Andechs-Merania

Otto III. Weimar-Orlamünde, sometimes called Otto IV (1244 – June 1285) was a German nobleman. He was a member of the House of Ascania and a titular Count of Weimar-Orlamünde. He was the ruling Count of Weimar and Lord of Rudolstadt and Plassenburg.

== Life ==
He was the son of Count Herman II and his wife, Beatrix of Andechs-Merania. In 1248, Otto III and his elder brother Herman III inherited the Franconian possessions of their maternal uncle Otto II. They divided their possessions, with Otto receiving Weimar, Rudolstadt and Plassenburg and Herman receiving Orlamünde.

On 29 December 1279, Otto III founded Himmelskron Abbey. He died in June 1285, and was buried in the collegiate church of the abbey.

== Marriage and issue ==
Otto III was married to Agnes of Truhendingen (d. 13 May 1285). Together, they had the following children:

- Otto "the Younger" (d. before September 1318)
- Otto V (d. 1315)
- Herman (d. 1319)
- Agnes (d. 1354) Abbess at Himmelkron monastery
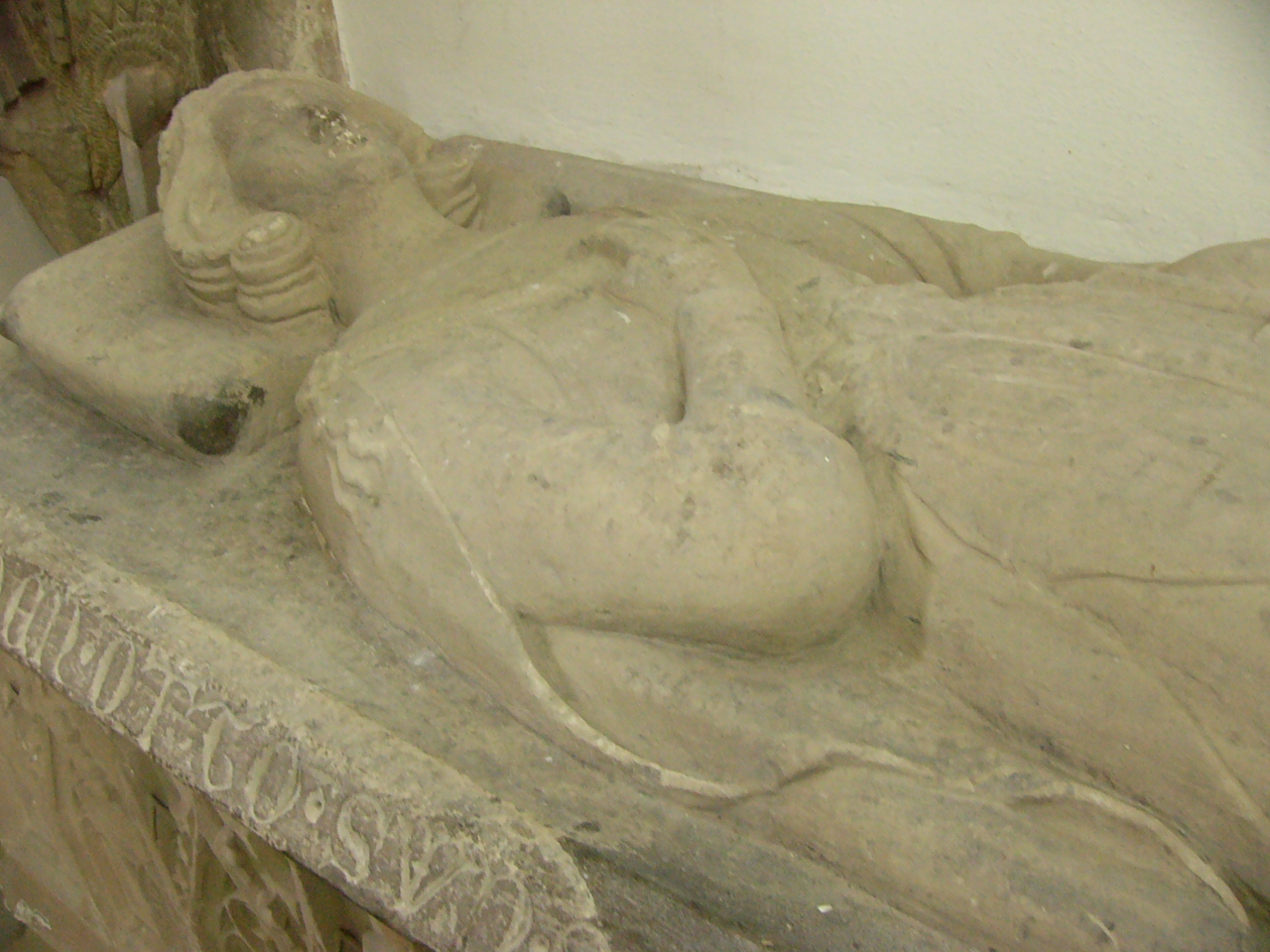
Sculpture on his grave

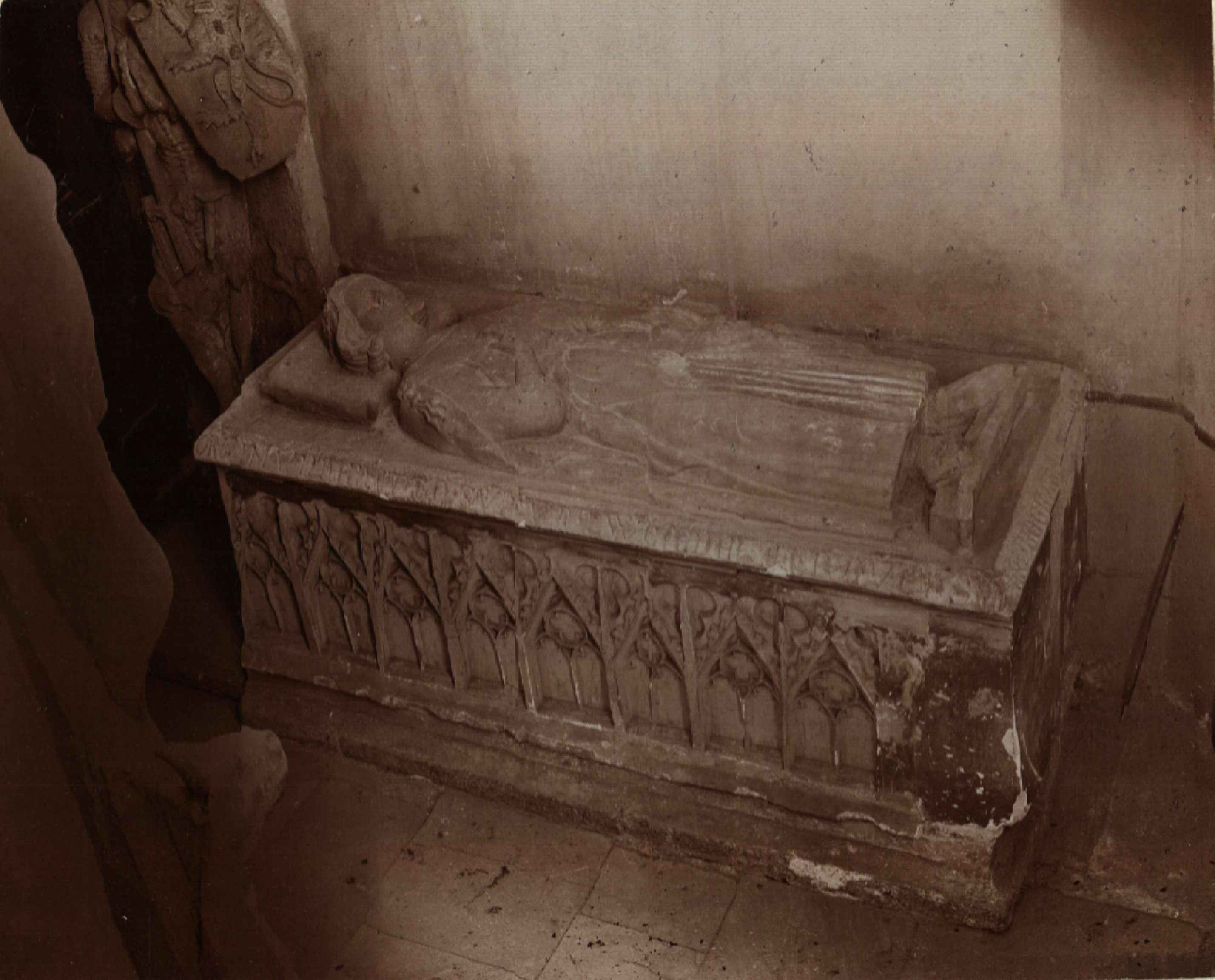
The sarcophagus of count Otto III of Weimar-Orlamünde

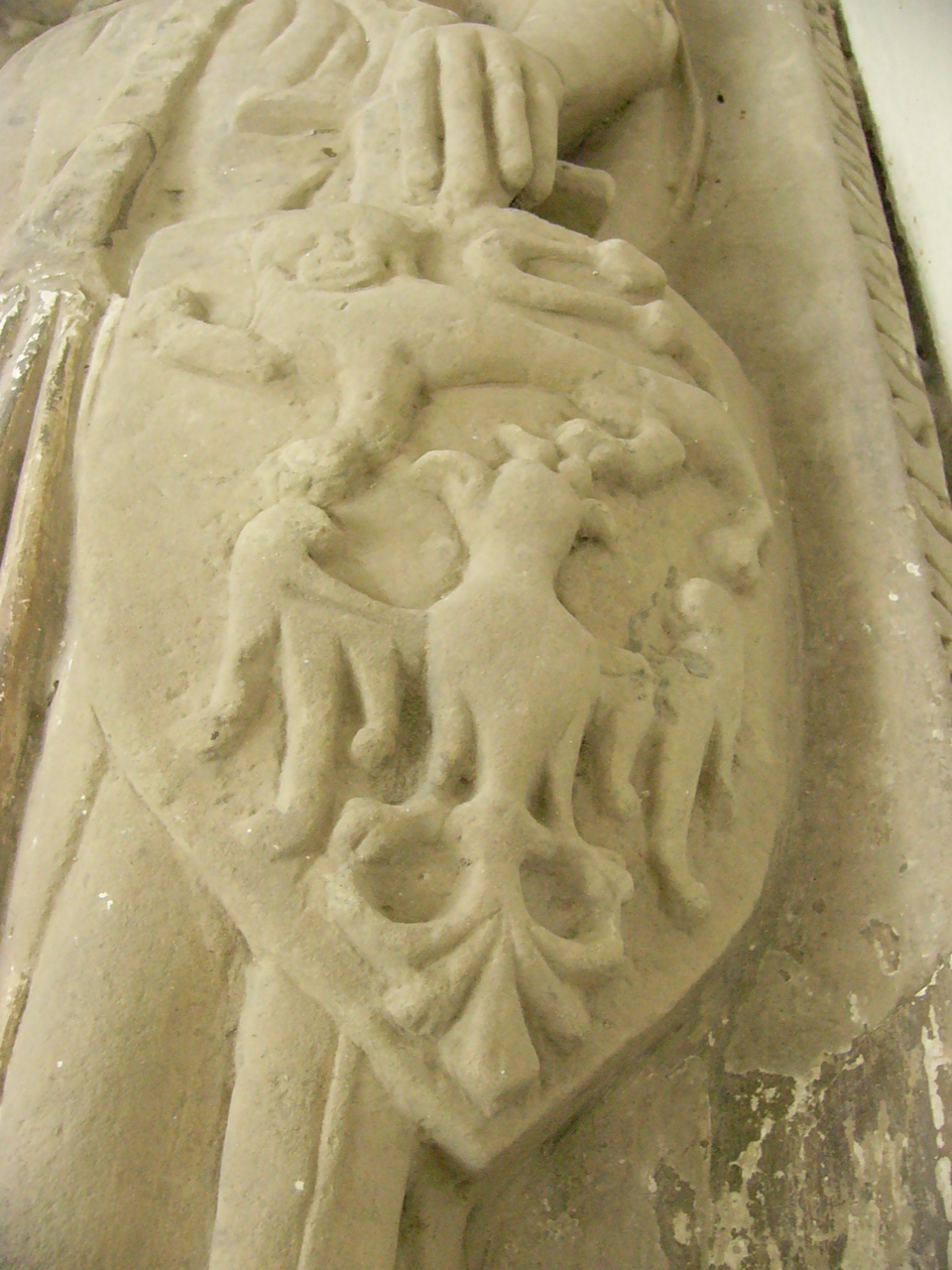
His coat of arms

Otto III of Weimar-Orlamünde House of Ascania Born: 1244 Died: June 1285
Preceded by Herman II	Count of Weimar; 1247-1285	Succeeded by Otto IV
