= Gronich =

Gronich can refer to:

- Shlomo Gronich, Israeli composer
- Goldkronach, town in Bavaria, Germany
- Kronach, town in Upper Franconia, Germany
