= Siegfried III =

Siegfried III may refer to:

- Siegfried III, Count of Weimar-Orlamünde (c. 1155 – 1206)
- Siegfried III (Archbishop of Mainz) (died in 1249)
