= Hermann III =

Hermann III may refer to:

- Hermann III, Duke of Swabia (died 1012)
- Hermann III, Margrave of Baden (died 1160)
- Hermann III, Count of Weimar-Orlamünde (1230–1283)
