= Waldenfels =

Waldenfels is a surname.

Notable people with the surname include:

- Rudolf Freiherr von Waldenfels (1895–1969), German general during World War II who commanded the 6th Panzer Division
- Rudolf von Waldenfels (born 1965), German writer, journalist and actor
- Hans Waldenfels SJ (1931–2023), German theologian
- Bernhard Waldenfels (1934–2026), German philosopher, brother of Hans
- Kristan von Waldenfels (born 2000), German politician (CSU)
