= Siegfried III of Weimar-Orlamünde =

German count (c. 1155-1206)

Siegfried III, Count of Weimar-Orlamünde
- Born: c. 1155
- Died: 1206
- Noble family: House of Ascania
- Spouse: Sophie of Denmark
- Father: Herman I, Count of Weimar-Orlamünde
- Mother: Irmgard

Siegfried III, Count of Weimar-Orlamünde (c. 1155 – 1206) was a member of the House of Ascania and a ruling Count of Weimar-Orlamünde.

He was the son of Count Herman I and his wife Irmgard. Herman I was son of Albert the Bear and Sophie of Winzenburg.

He was regarded as a supporter of the House of Hohenstaufen. He spent some time in Denmark. He married Sophie (1159 – c. 1208), a daughter of King Valdemar I of Denmark and had two sons:

- Albert II
- Herman II

== Sources ==
- Line, Philip (2007). Kingship and State Formation in Sweden: 1130 - 1290. Brill.
- Lyon, Jonathan R. (2013). Princely Brothers and Sisters: The Sibling Bond in German Politics, 1100-1250. Cornell University Press.

Siegfried III of Weimar-Orlamünde House of Ascania Born: c. 1155 Died: 1206
Preceded by Herman I	Count of Weimar-Orlamünde; 1176–1206	Succeeded by Albert II and Herman II
