= Hermann III of Weimar-Orlamünde =

German count (c. 1230-1283)

Hermann III, Count of Weimar-Orlamünde
- Born: c. 1230
- Died: 1283
- Noble family: House of Ascania
- Issue: Albert II, Margrave of Meissen
- Father: Herman II, Count of Weimar-Orlamünde
- Mother: Beatrix of Andechs-Merania

Herman III, Count of Weimar-Orlamünde (c. 1230 – 1283) was a member of the Weimar-Orlamünde branch of the House of Ascania.

== Life ==
Herman III "the Elder", was a son of Herman II (d. 1247) and his wife, Beatrix of Andechs-Merania (d. 1265). Hermann and his brother Otto III jointly inherited the Franconian possessions of their maternal uncle Otto II. They resided at the Plassenburg.

In 1278, Hermann and Otto divided their inheritance. Otto III took the County of Weimar and the Plassenburg; Hermann III took the County of Orlamünde.

Hermann III died of the plague in 1283.

== Marriage and issue ==
His wife, whose name is unknown, a Lady from the House of Candia-Merania, died after 21 July 1279. They had four children:

1. Elisabeth "the Elder" (d. before 24 March 1333), married:
  1. Hertmann I of Lobdeburg-Arnshaugk (d. 20 February 1289)
  2. Albert II, Margrave of Meissen (d. 20 November 1315)
2. Herman V (before 1287 – after 1312)
3. Henry III (d. after 26 March 1354), succeeded his father as Count of Orlamünde, married Irmgard of Schwarzburg (d. 13 July 1354)
4. Elisabeth "the Younger" (d. 17 March 1319), a nun at the Weißenfels monastery

Hermann III of Weimar-Orlamünde House of Ascania Born: 1230 Died: 1283
Preceded by Herman II as Count of Weimar-Orlamünde	Count of Orlamünde; 1247–1283	Succeeded by Henry III
