= Plassenburg =

Castle in Kulmbach, Bavaria, Germany

Coordinates: 50°06′30″N 11°27′48″E

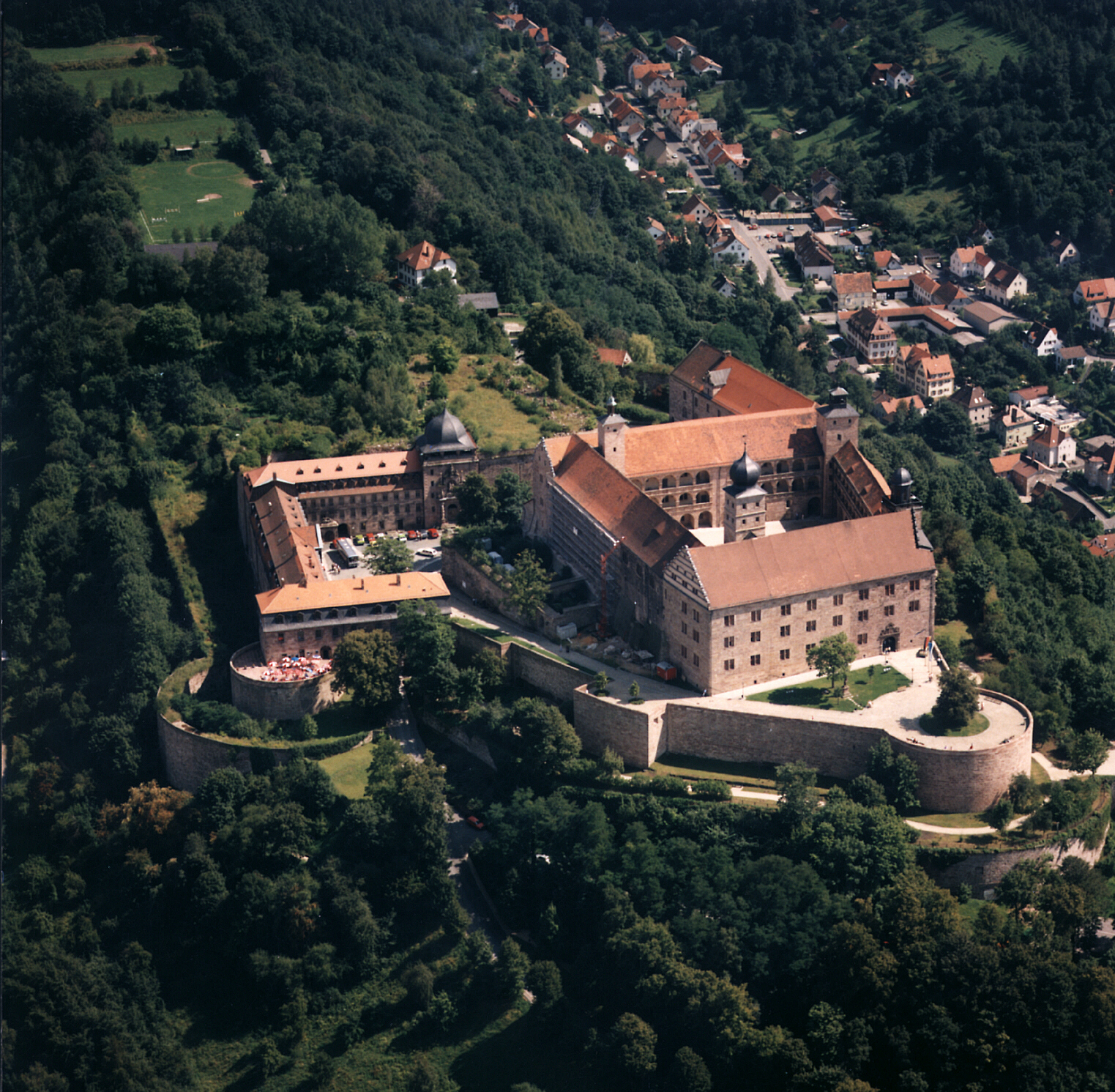
Plassenburg

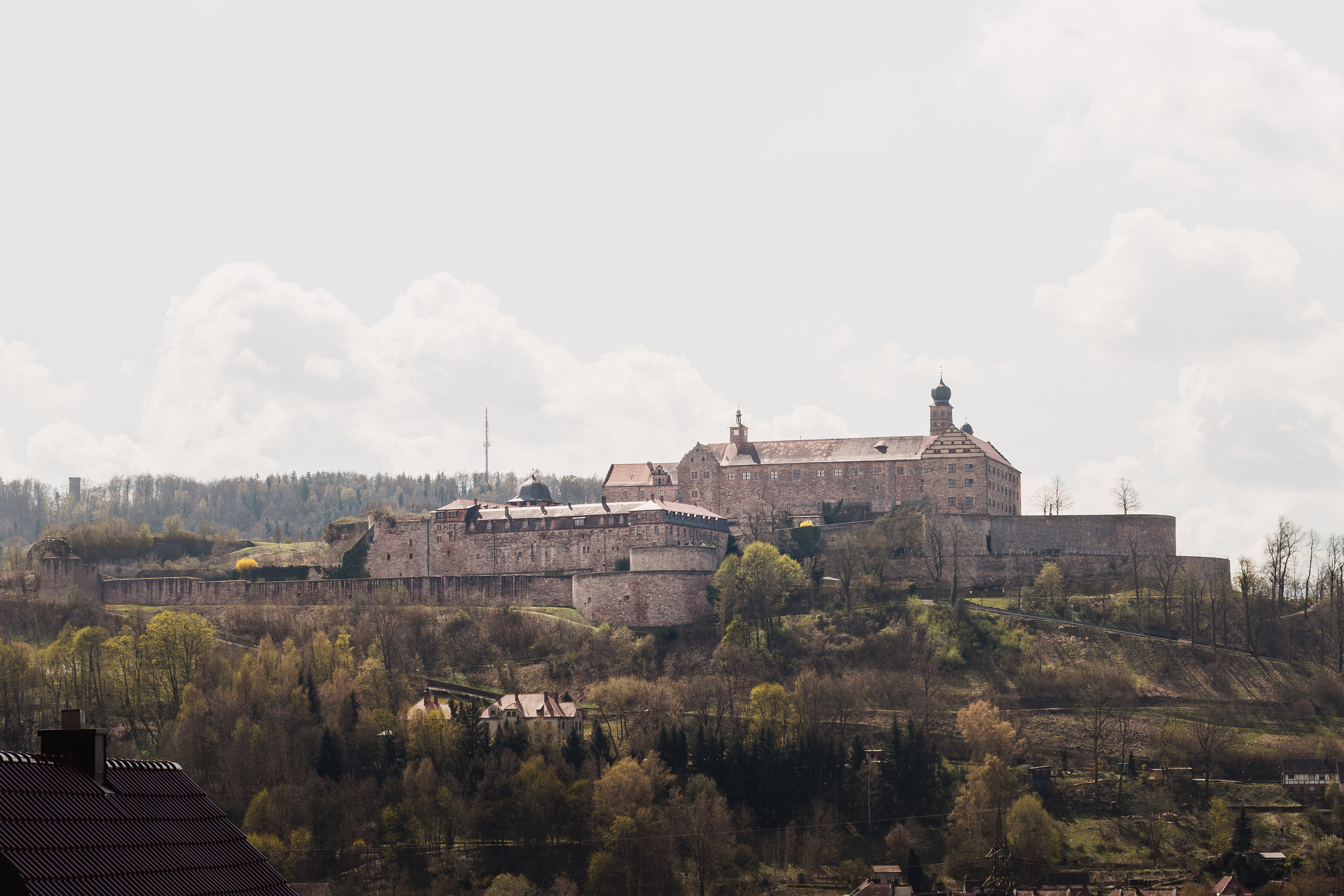
Side view of the Plassenburg

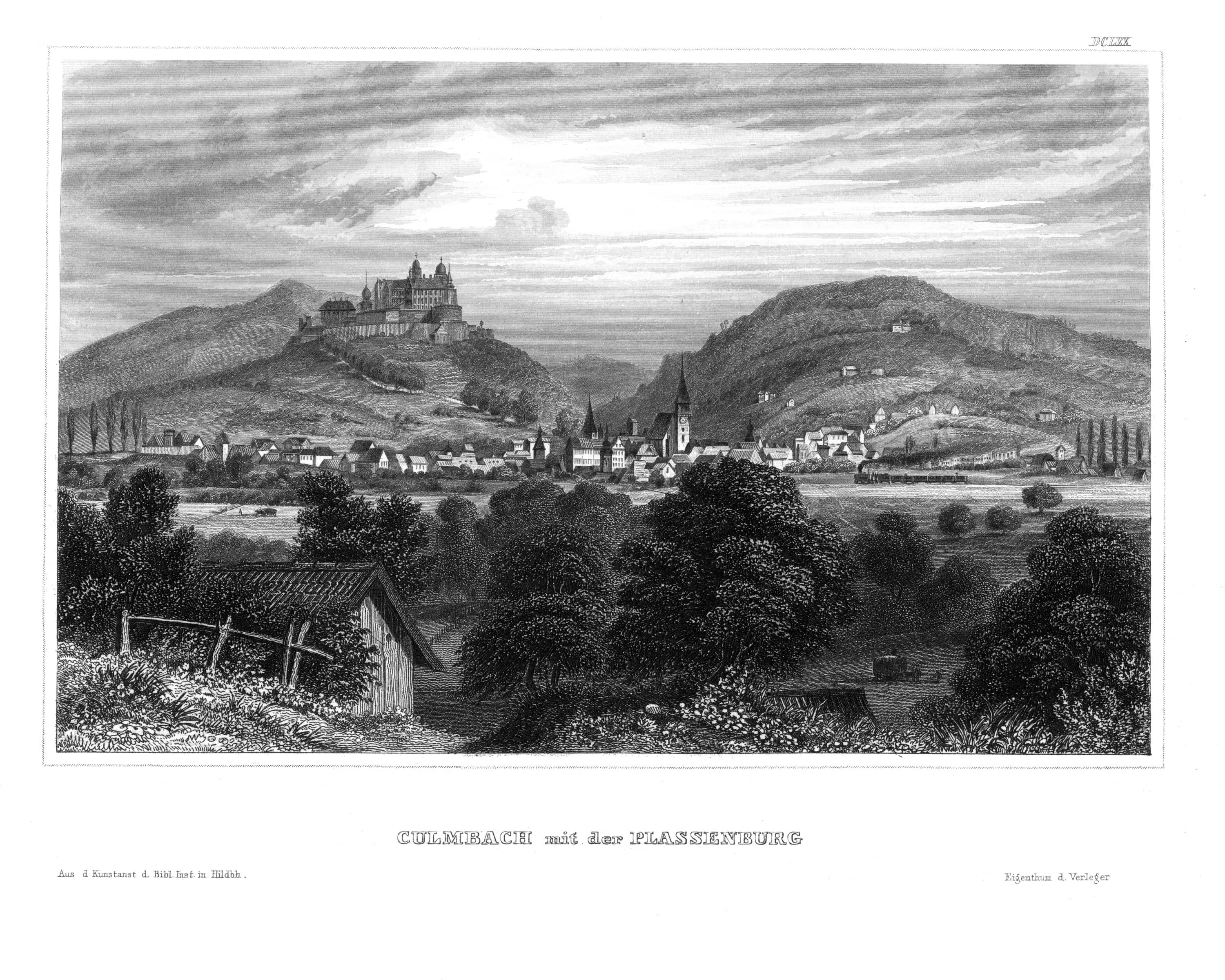
Historical print of Plassenburg overlooking Kulmbach

Plassenburg is a castle in the city of Kulmbach in Bavaria. It is one of the most impressive castles in Germany and a symbol of the city. It was first mentioned in 1135. The Plassenberg family were ministerial of the counts of Andechs (later the dukes of Andechs-Meranien) and used as their seat the Plassenburg. The House of Guttenberg, a prominent Franconian noble family, traces its origins back to 1149 with a Gundeloh v. Blassenberg (Plassenberg). The name Guttenberg is derived from Guttenberg and was adopted by a Heinrich von Blassenberg around 1310. From 1340, the Hohenzollerns governed from Plassenburg castle their territories in Franconia till 1604. The Plassenburg was fortress and residence for the Hohenzollerns.

It was destroyed in 1554 at the end of the second Margravian war (1552–1554) of margrave Albert Alcibiades. The Plassenburg was later rebuilt by the architect Caspar Vischer as an impressive stronghold and as a huge palace. In 1792, Margrave Alexander sold the Plassenburg to his cousin, the King of Prussia. A combined Bavarian and French army under the command of Jérôme Bonaparte, brother of Napoleon, besieged the Plassenburg in 1806. In 1810, Kulmbach became Bavarian and the castle was used as a prison and as a military hospital. During the second world war, the Organisation Todt used the Plassenburg as a training camp and recreation home. Today, it is a museum and a venue for cultural events.

It contains a significant collection of Prussian military artifacts and portraits.

== History ==
Plassenburg Castle was first mentioned in 1135, when it was described by Count Berthold II of Andechs as comes de Plassenberch. Presumably he was also the founder of the castle, which was built to the west of an earlier fortified farmstead. To begin with, the castle was a central supporting stronghold for the Meranian rulers of the Upper Main and Franconian Forest.

After the death of the last Andechs-Meranian, Duke Otto VIII, his brother-in-law divided his inheritance. Plassenburg Castle, along with Kulmbach, Berneck, Goldkronach, Wirsberg, Trebgast, and Pretzendorf (now Himmelkron) went to Hermann III and Otto III, the Counts of Weimar-Orlamünde. The two sons of Herman II (died 1247) and Beatrix of Andechs-Merania initially ruled together as "Lords of Plassenburg". After 1278 they divided the inheritance of their father, whereupon Otto III was given sole possession of the domain of Plassenburg and the territory around Weimar. Otto III died in 1285 and the Plassenburg appeared soon afterwards in the hands of his son Otto IV. His son in turn, Count Otto VI of Orlamünde, who was the only Orlamünde since 1323 who was described as "Lord of Plassenburg", pledged this lordship together with the Plassenburg, Kulmbach, Trebgast and Berneck in 1338 to Burgrave John II of Nuremberg. As a result, after Otto VI's death in 1340, Plassenburg fell to the Burgraves of Nuremberg from the House of Hohenzollern.

Gradually, Plassenburg Castle developed into a new centre of power for the Hohenzollerns. At the time of Burgrave Frederick V of Nuremberg (who reigned 1357–1397), the Plassenburg had already outstripped the Cadolzburg - a traditional burgravial residence. In 1397 Burgrave Frederick V stepped down from the business of government and chose the Plassenburg as his retirement home. The Hohenzollerns' territory in Franconia was divided between his sons, John III and Frederick VI, later to be the Elector of Brandenburg, in accordance with the Dispositio Fridericiana of 1385. Thus, the Plassenburg became the centre of power for the so-called Principality of the Mountains (Fürstentum ob dem Gebirg), later the Margraviate of Brandenburg-Kulmbach. After the death of John III in 1420, his estate fell to his brother, Frederick, who, in 1421, created the office of "Captain of the Mountains" to rule his domain. Plassenburg remained the administrative centre of this hilly principality until after the middle of the 16th century.

The imprisonment of the Countess Barbara of Brandenburg in March 1493, began the sad chapter of Plassenburg Castle as a family prison. This reached a peak in February 1515 when Margrave Casimir of Brandenburg-Kulmbach locked up his father, Margrave Frederick I of Brandenburg-Ansbach, in a tower room at Plassenburg from which he could not leave for 12 years. In 1542, Margrave Albert II of Brandenburg-Kulmbach moved the Residenz of the Margraves of Brandenburg-Kulmbach for the first time from Plassenburg, which continued to serve primarily as a country fortress to Bayreuth from then on.

== Bibliography ==
- Karl Bosl (Hrsg.): Bayern (= Handbuch der historischen Stätten Deutschlands. Band 7). 3. Auflage. Kröner, Stuttgart 1981, ISBN 3-520-27703-4.
- Daniel Burger: Landesfestungen der Hohenzollern in Franken und Brandenburg. Sonderausgabe. Freunde der Plassenburg, Kulmbach 2000, ISBN 3-925162-20-8 (Schriftenreihe „Die Plassenburg“ für Heimatforschung und Kulturpflege in Ostfranken 51), (Zugleich: Eichstätt, Kath. Univ., Diss., 1999).
- Günter Dippold, Peter Zeitler (Hrsg): Die Plassenburg. Zur Geschichte eines Wahrzeichens. Schulze, Lichtenfels 2008, ISBN 978-3-87735-188-8 (CHW-Monographien 8).
- August Gebeßler: Stadt und Landkreis Kulmbach. In: Die Kunstdenkmäler von Bayern, Kurzinventare, III. Band. Deutscher Kunstverlag. München 1958. S. 16–26.
- Helmut Hennig: Die „Meranische Erbschaft“. Segen oder Fluch. Ein Beitrag zum Hohenzollernjahr. Regierung von Oberfranken, Bayreuth 1992 (Heimatbeilage zum Amtlichen Schulanzeiger des Regierungsbezirks Oberfranken. 193).
- Erwin Herrmann: Zur Geschichte der Plassenburg. (Von d. Anfängen um 900 bis 1700). 1. Teilabdruck aus der „Kurzen Geschichte Kulmbachs bis 1806“. Regierung von Oberfranken, Bayreuth 1982 (Heimatbeilage zum Amtlichen Schulanzeiger des Regierungsbezirks Oberfranken. 84).
- Hellmut Kunstmann: Burgen am Obermain. Unter besonderer Würdigung der Plassenburg. Freunde der Plassenburg e.V. u. a., Kulmbach 1975 (Reihe Die Plassenburg, 36)
- Gerhard Pfeiffer: Die landesgeschichtliche Funktion der Plassenburg. In: Jahrbuch für fränkische Landesforschung. Bd. 29. Degner & Co., Neustadt an der Aisch 1969, S. 245–259.
- Harald Stark: Die Plassenburg, „obergebirgische“ Residenz und Landesfestung. In: Johannes Erichsen, Evamaria Brockhoff (Hrsg.): Bayern & Preußen & Bayerns Preußen. Schlaglichter auf eine historische Beziehung. Haus der Bayerischen Gesichte, Augsburg 1999, ISBN 3-927233-67-6 (Reihe: Veröffentlichungen zur bayerischen Geschichte und Kultur, 41).
- Sabine Weigand-Karg: Die Plassenburg. Residenz und Hofleben bis 1604. Späthling, Weißenstadt 1998, ISBN 3-926621-08-7 (Zugleich: Bayreuth, Univ., Diss., 1992).
- Jakob Wassermann: Die Gefangenen auf der Plassenburg. Erzählung, 1909
  - Wolfgang Schoberth, Doris Leithner: Text und Kommentar zu „Die Gefangenen auf der Plassenburg“. Reihe: Buchners Schulbibliothek der Moderne, H. 22. Buchner, Bamberg 2005, ISBN 376613972X.
