= Goldkronach =

- Town
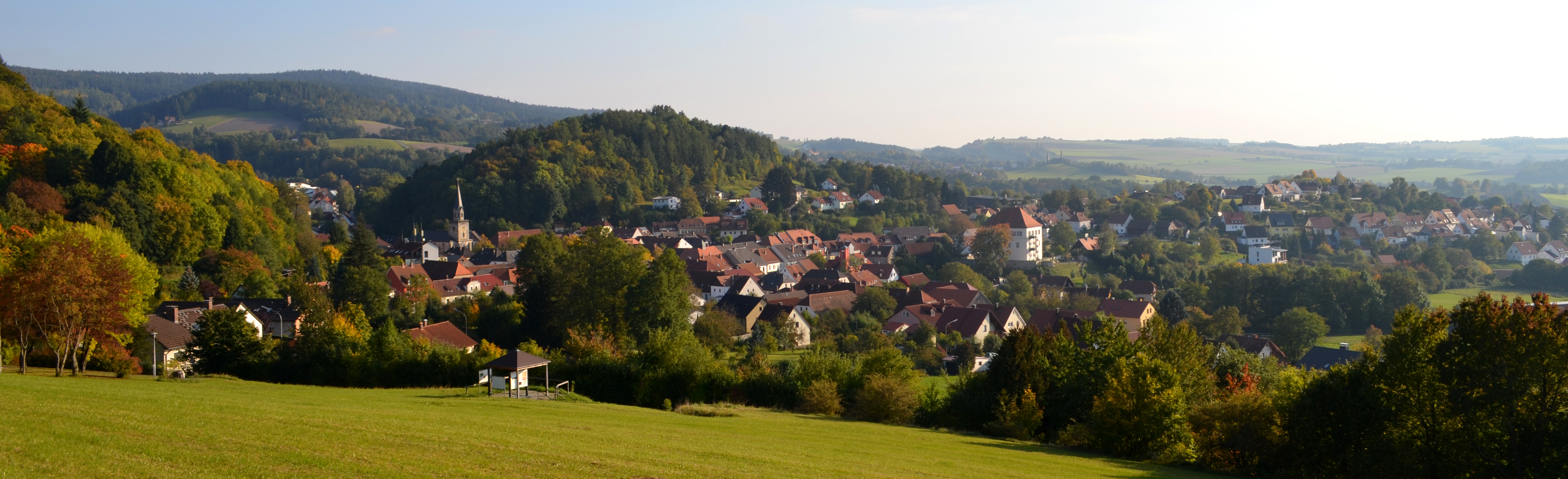
- Goldkronach

- Coat of arms

- Location of Goldkronach within Bayreuth district
- Interactive map of Goldkronach
- Location within Germany Location within Bavaria
- Coordinates: 50°0′41.40″N 11°41′14.33″E
- Country: Germany
- State: Bavaria
- Admin. region: Oberfranken
- District: Bayreuth
- Subdivisions: 26 Ortsteile

Government
  - Mayor (2020–26): Holger Bär

Area
  - Total: 30.68 km^{2} (11.85 sq mi)
- Elevation: 443 m (1,453 ft)

Population (2025-12-31)
  - Total: 3,408
  - Density: 111.1/km^{2} (287.7/sq mi)
- Time zone: UTC+01:00 (CET)
  - Summer (DST): UTC+02:00 (CEST)
- Postal codes: 95497
- Dialling codes: 09273
- Vehicle registration: BT
- Website: www.goldkronach.de

Goldkronach (German pronunciation: [ɡɔltˈkʁoːnax]; East Franconian: Gronich) is a town in the district of Bayreuth, in Bavaria, Germany. It is situated near the Fichtel Mountains, 12 km northeast of Bayreuth.

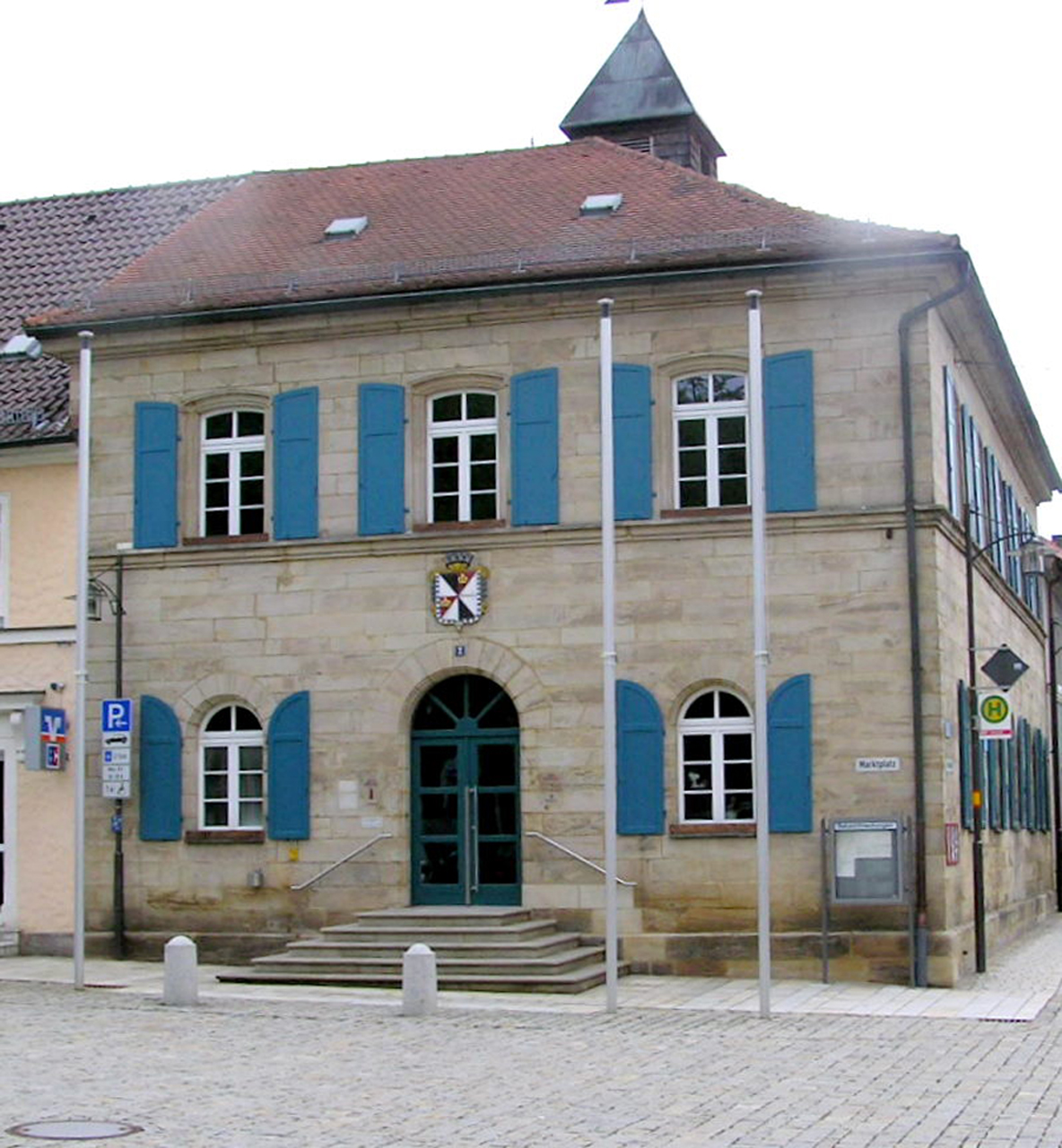
Town hall Goldkronach

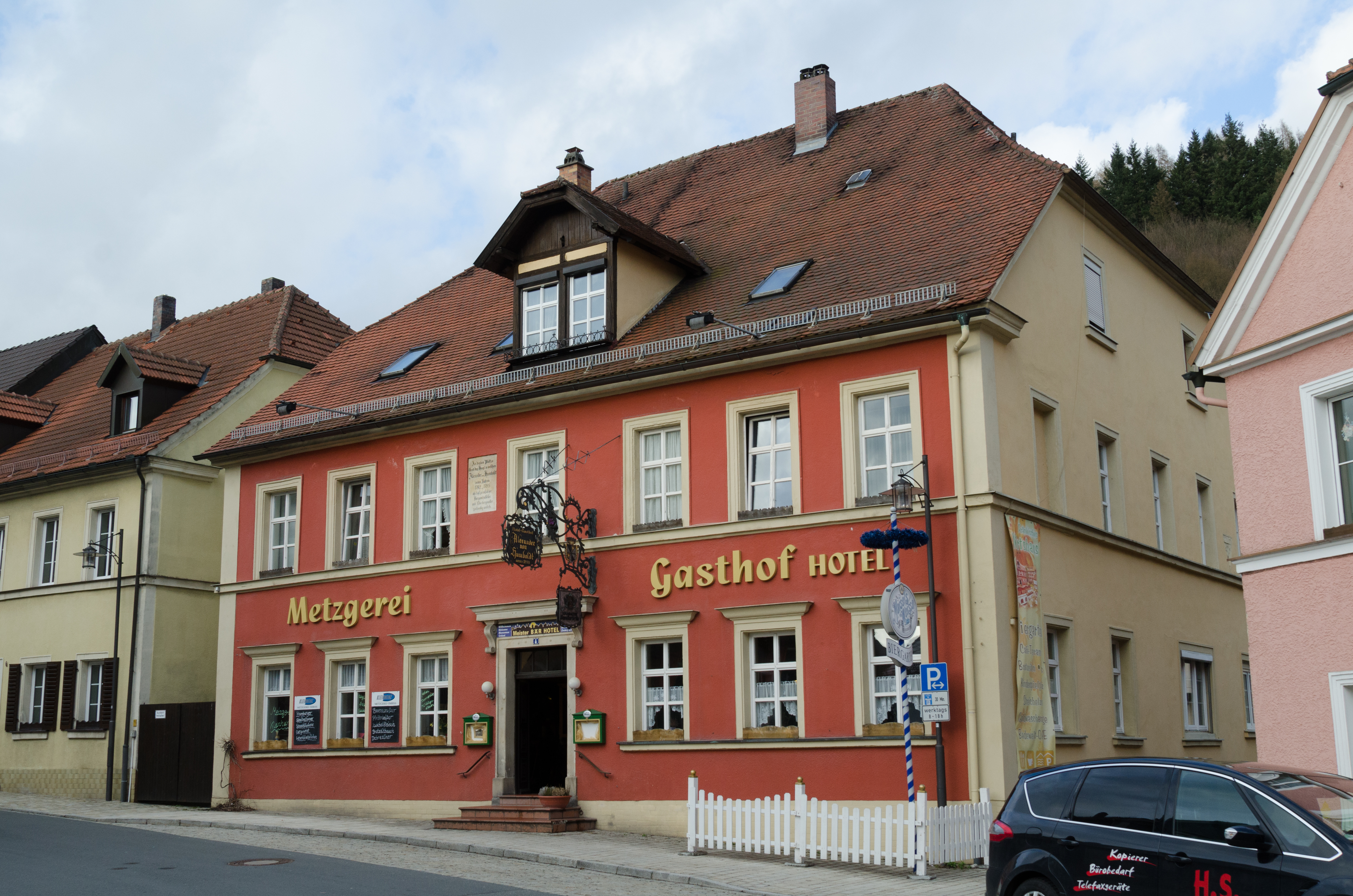
Goldkronach

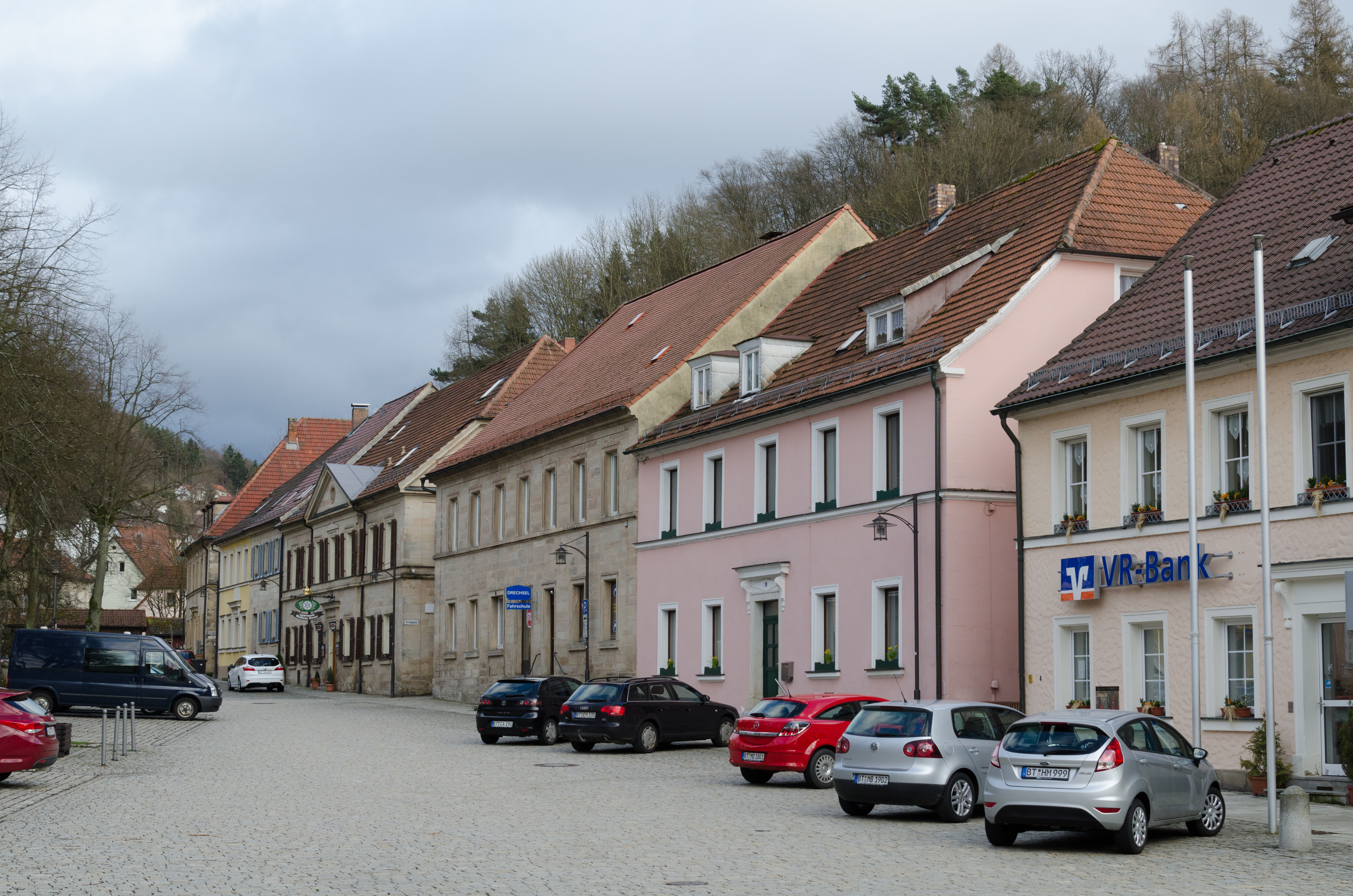
Goldkronach Market place

== History ==
On 25 June 1836, at 22:15, residents awoke to a man yelling "Fire! Fire!". In almost 2 hours, almost half of the eastern part of the town burned down, including the parish church, all two schools, the City Hall, 55 houses, and 16 other buildings. 127 families were rendered homeless. Three years later, on 18 June 1839 midnight, another fire broke out in the market. Within two hours, 29 houses and 17 buildings in the south side of town became the victims of the fire.

== Population development ==
- 1961: 2945
- 1970: 2935
- 1987: 2903
- 2000: 3598
- 2010: 3606

== Notable people ==
- Sigismund von Reitzenstein (1766-1847), politician and diplomat of Baden

=== Lived and worked in Goldkronach ===
- Georgius Agricola (1494–1555), scholar of the Renaissance and the father of the mineralogy. For Goldkronach in his writings, Agricola called a weekly gold transfer of 1500 Gulden.
- Alexander von Humboldt (1769–1859), natural scientist, from 1792 to 1796 Oberbergmeister and Oberbergrat in the Prussian Goldkronach. Humboldt revolutionized mining from a technical point of view, but also introduced measures for the education and social protection of miners.
