= Himmelkron =

- Municipality
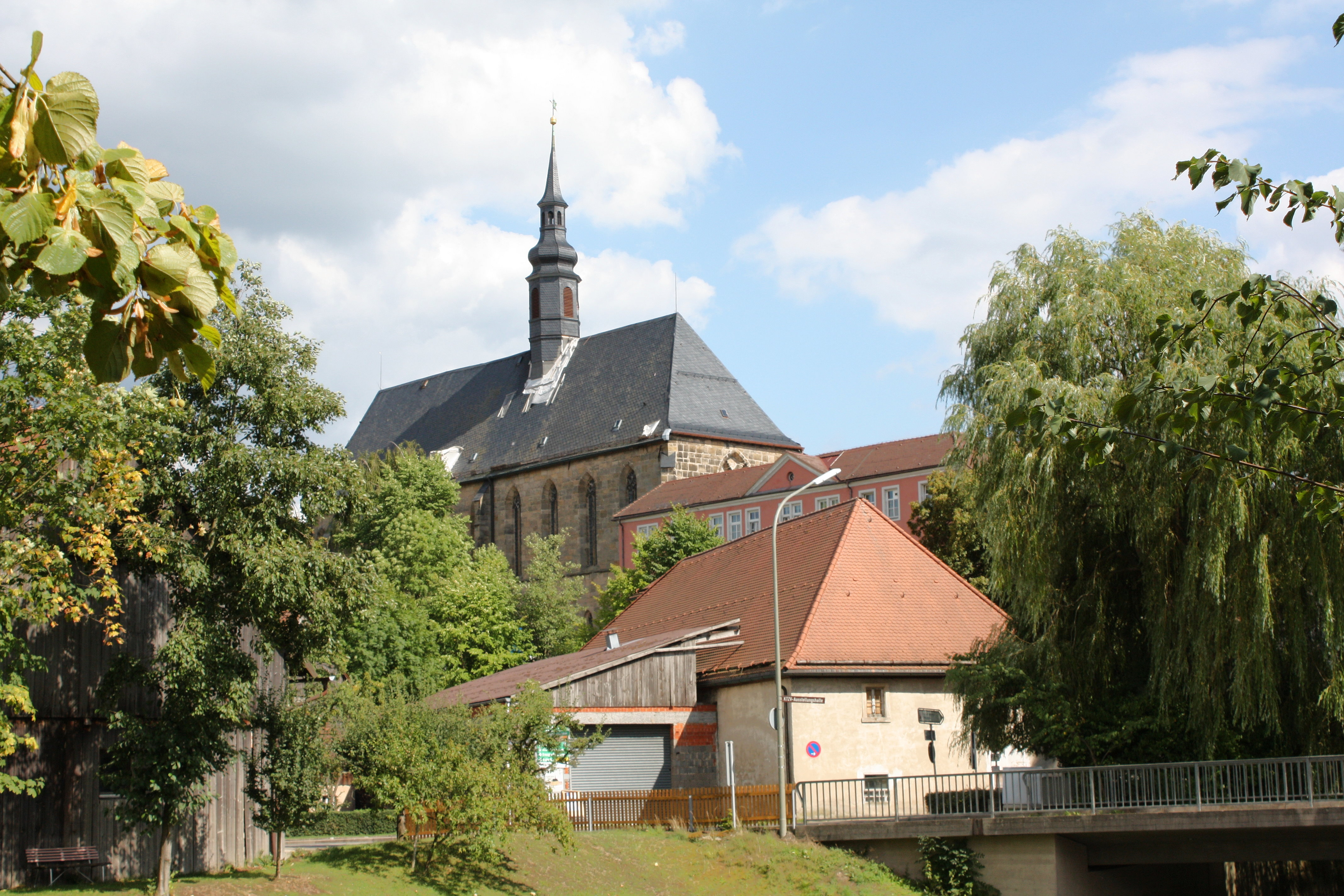
- View towards the former abbey

- Coat of arms

- Location of Himmelkron within Kulmbach district
- Interactive map of Himmelkron
- Location within Germany Location within Bavaria
- Coordinates: 50°4′N 11°35′E
- Country: Germany
- State: Bavaria
- Admin. region: Oberfranken
- District: Kulmbach
- Subdivisions: 3 Ortsteile

Government
  - Mayor (2020–26): Gerhard Schneider (CSU)

Area
  - Total: 23.05 km^{2} (8.90 sq mi)
- Elevation: 335–474 m (1,099–1,555 ft)

Population (2025-12-31)
  - Total: 3,189
  - Density: 138.4/km^{2} (358.3/sq mi)
- Time zone: UTC+01:00 (CET)
  - Summer (DST): UTC+02:00 (CEST)
- Postal codes: 95502
- Dialling codes: 09227 (Himmelkron) 09273 (Lanzendorf and Gössenreuth)
- Vehicle registration: KU
- Website: www.himmelkron.de

Himmelkron is a municipality in the district of Kulmbach in Bavaria in Germany.

== City arrangement ==
Himmelkron is arranged in the following boroughs:

- Gössenreuth
- Himmelkron
- Lanzendorf
