= Ludger Stühlmeyer =

German composer

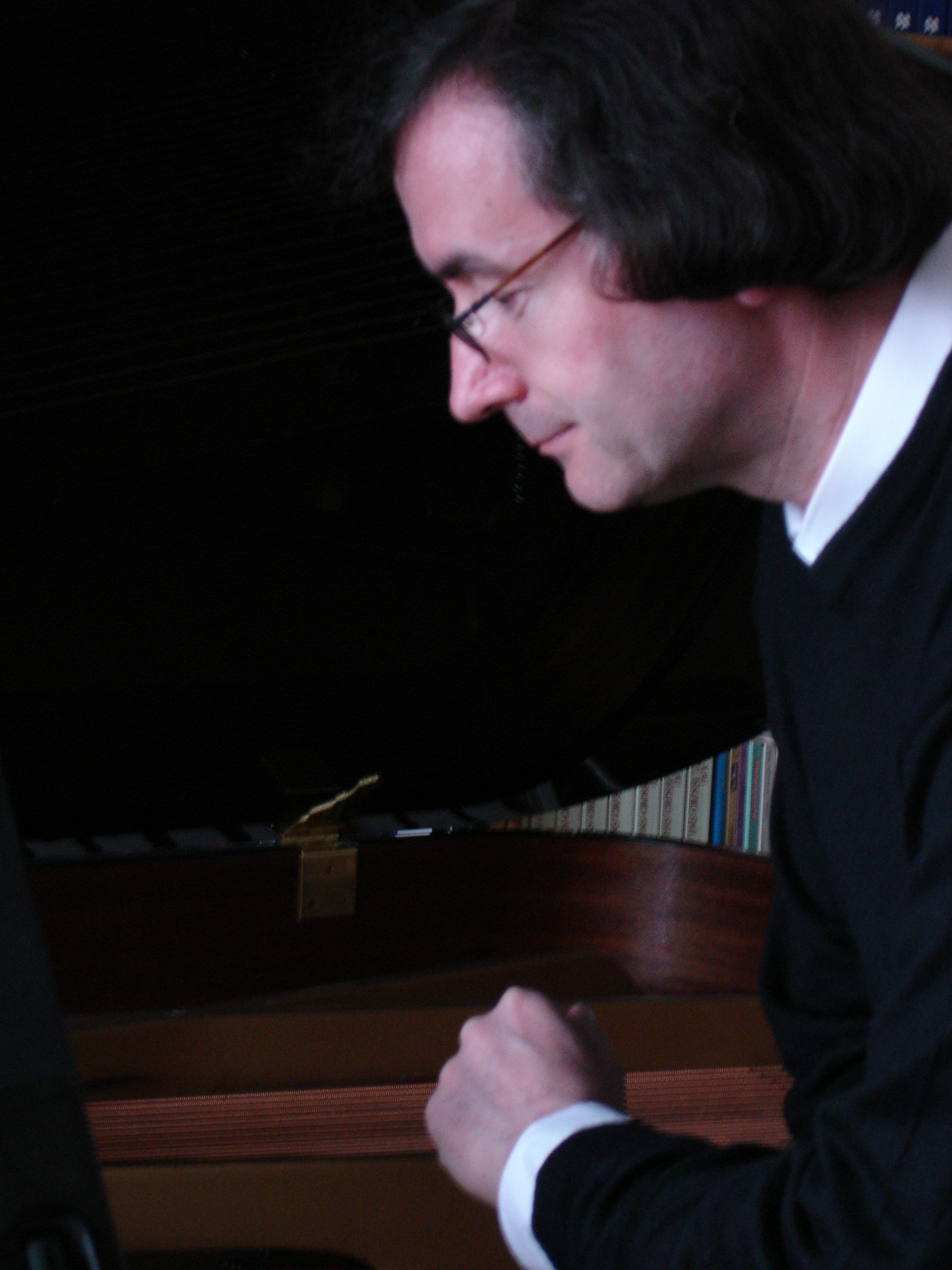
- Stühlmeyer in April 2005
- Born: 3 October 1961 (age 64); Melle, Germany
- Education: University of the Arts Bremen; University of Münster
- Occupations: cantor; composer; musicologist
- Years active: 1980–present
- Title: Doctor of Philosophy; Music director ACV
- Spouse: Barbara Stühlmeyer
- Awards: cultural award of Hof

Ludger Stühlmeyer (born 3 October 1961 in Melle, West Germany) is a German cantor, organist, composer, docent and musicologist.

== Biography ==
Stühlmeyer was born to a family of cantors and made his first steps under the guidance of his father in the town church (Stadtkirche) of St. Matthew in Melle. He received music lessons from the pianist, composer and direktor of music Karl Schäfer at the Osnabrück conservatory and from Karlheinz Höne at the church musician school of the Roman Catholic Diocese of Osnabrück. After completing his A-levels at the grammar school at Melle, he studied Christian music (Wolfgang Helbich, Winfried Schlepphorst), Early music, and Singing at the University of the Arts Bremen, followed by studies of composition with Günther Kretzschmar, Karlheinz Stockhausen, and Helge Jung. He attended seminars in Gregorian semiology with Luigi Agustoni, Godehard Joppich, and Johannes Berchmans Göschl, and studied musicology, philosophy, and theology at the Westfälische Wilhelms-Universität of Münster. He concluded his studies with a doctorate at the faculty of philosophy. Ludger Stühlmeyer received a scholarship from the Diocese of Osnabrück. His studies were also financially supported by the Friedrich-Baur-Stiftung, the Oberfrankenstiftung Bayreuth and the Wolfgang-Siegel-Stiftung.

His grandfather Heinrich Stühlmeyer, a "silent hero of the resistance" against National Socialism, who was deported to the concentration camp Emslandlager in 1940 for his support of the Catholic church and those persecuted by the Third Reich, had been employed at St. Peter's at Melle-Gesmold for 47 years. In 1980 Ludger Stühlmeyer became his successor. He was appointed as custodian of music in the diocese of Münster in 1988 and has been city cantor at Hof as well as Dekanatskantor for the deanery of Hochfranken since 1994. He is also tutor at the Erzbischöfliches Kirchenmusikseminar, and works at the Amt für Kirchenmusik in the archdiocese of Bamberg. 2003 he followed the former music director of the archdiocese Bamberg as chiefeditor of the magazin church-musical informations of the archdiocese Bamberg (Kirchenmusik im Erzbistum Bamberg).

Stühlmeyer is member of the Max-Baumann-Society (MBG), the International Dieterich-Buxtehude-Society (IDBG) and the International Valentin-Rathgeber-Society (IVRG). He is married to theologian and musicologist Barbara Stühlmeyer and father of Lea Stühlmeyer. His brothers are the pastoral theologian and priest Thomas Stühlmeyer and deacon Klaus Stühlmeyer.

== Musical style and influences ==
Stühlmeyer's instrumental and vocal music is strongly influenced by Helge Jung and Karlheinz Stockhausen. His compositional technique aims to make auditory experiences a medium of communication. Concentrating the essence into the seemingly simple, it is his goal to open up the power of meaning inherent in self-referential sounds, a meaning that comprises philosophical thought as well as spiritual experience. His liturgical music is inspired by the relationship between words and music in Gregorian chant, which defines and realizes composition as the sounding body of words. During conceptual conversations with bishop Friedrich Ostermann from Münster, he created the foundation for a new reception of the Evangelienkantate for children within Catholic liturgy.

== Honours ==
- In 2005, he was awarded the Certificate of Honour of Bavaria by the minister of state Christa Stevens.
- In 2011, Oberbürgermeister Dr Harald Fichtner awarded him the Johann-Christian-Reinhart-Plakette, the city of Hof's highest award for special cultural achievements.
- In 2013, the Committee of the General Association of the Cecilian Movement Germany appointed him Director of Music ACV for outstanding artistic and educational achievements.
- In 2020, he was awarded the Certificate of Honour of Bavaria by the minister of state Kerstin Schreyer.

== Selected publications ==
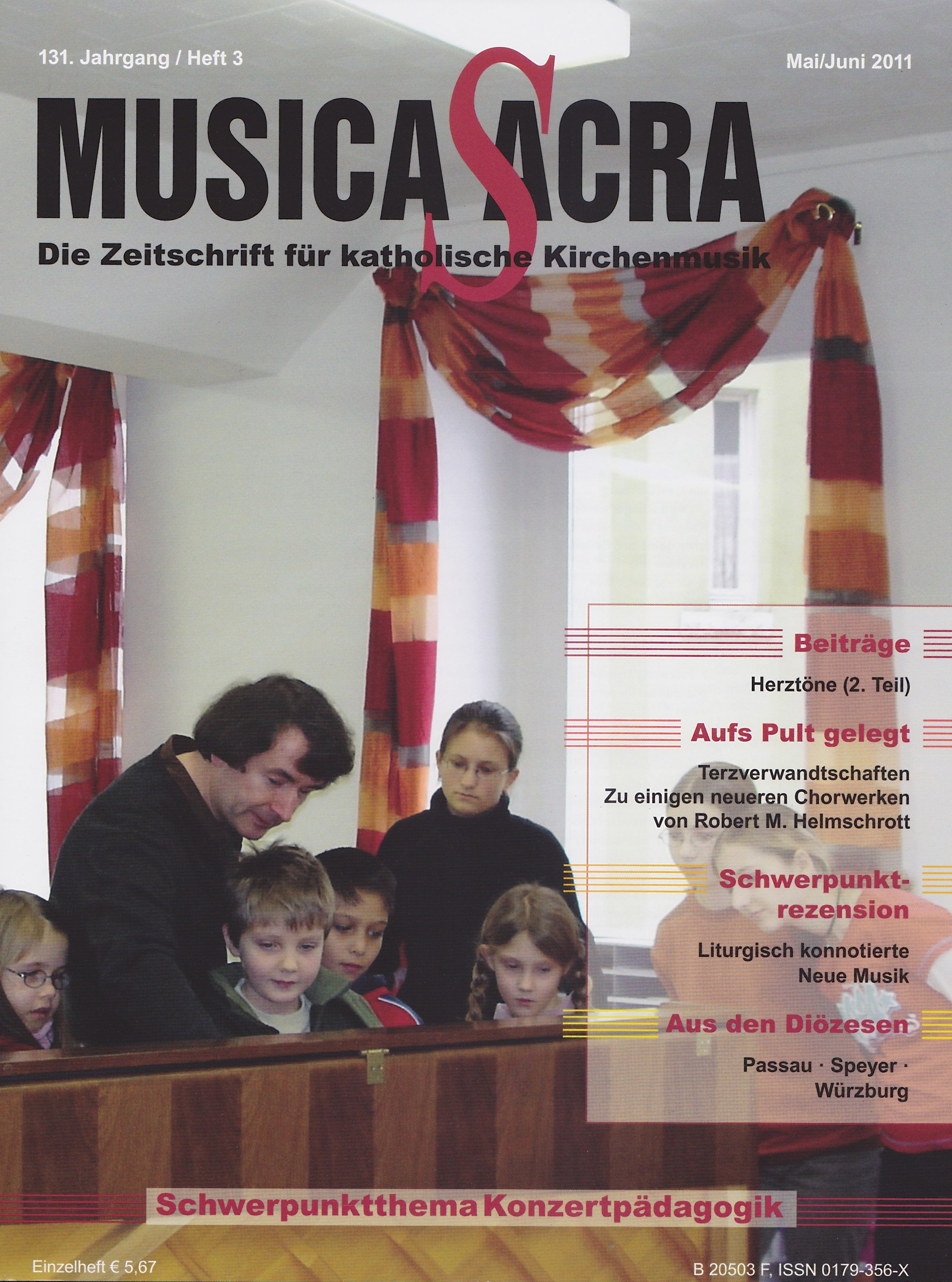
Ludger Stühlmeyer (2011)

- Die Rolle der Musik in der religiösen Entwicklung der Menschheit unter besonderer Berücksichtigung des Juden- und Christentums. Diploma thesis, Hochschulschrift, Bremen 1986.
- Überlegungen zu einer Anthropologie des Hörens als Grundlage eines liturgiegerechten Musikverständnisses. In: Kirchenmusik im Erzbistum Bamberg, no. 28, Bamberg March 2002, p. 7–10.
- Wer singt, hat etwas zu sagen. In: Praxis gottesdienst, Liturgische Institute Trier, Salzburg, Fribourg (Editor) 7/2006, ISSN 1610-1847.
- In vielen Sprachen und Tönen. Ein Streifzug durch 1000 Jahre Musik. In: Jahrbuch der Erzdiözese Bamberg 2007. Heinrichs-Verlag Bamberg, issue 82, June 2006, p. 33–37.
- Stationen der Kirchenmusik im Erzbistum Bamberg. Bamberg 2007.
- Curia sonans. Die Musikgeschichte der Stadt Hof. Eine Studie zur Kultur Oberfrankens. Von der Gründung des Bistums Bamberg bis zur Gegenwart (Phil. Diss.). Bayerische Verlagsanstalt, Heinrichs-Verlag Bamberg 2010, ISBN 978-3-89889-155-4.
- Das Leben singen. Christliche Lieder und ihr Ursprung. Together with Barbara Stühlmeyer. Verlag DeBehr Radeberg 2011, ISBN 978-3-939241-24-9.
- Das Ohr am Puls der Zeit – der Klosterkomponist Johann Valentin Rathgeber – Fleißiger Kantorensohn mit spiraligem Studienweg. In: Musica sacra. Issue 132 no. 2, Bärenreiter-Verlag, Kassel 2012, p. 80f, ISSN 0179-356X.
- Bernhard Lichtenberg. Ich werde meinem Gewissen folgen. Together with Barbara Stühlmeyer. Topos plus Verlagsgemeinschaft Kevelaer 2013, ISBN 978-3-836708-35-7.
- Nikolaus Decius – ein Kirchenlieddichter aus Hochfranken. In: Jahrbuch der Erzdiözese Bamberg 2014. Heinrichs-Verlag Bamberg, issue 89, June 2013, p. 72–76.
- Klagraum Romantik – Die Musik. In: Musica sacra. Issue 135 no. 3, Bärenreiter Kassel 2015, p. 160f.
- Valentin Rathgeber. Leben und Werk. Verlag Sankt Michaelsbund, München 2016, ISBN 978-3-943135-78-7.
- Wie Komponisten den Glauben zum Klingen bringen. Eine Zeitreise am Beispiel weihnachtlicher Musik. In: Jahrbuch des Erzbistums Bamberg 2017. Heinrichs-Verlag Bamberg, issue 92, June 2016, p. 58–64.
- Konfessionalität und Ökumenizität – Kirchenmusik gestern und heute. In: Abbruch – Umbruch – Aufbruch. Reformation und Ökumene in Mittel- und Oberfranken. Eine Arbeitshilfe zum Lutherjahr. Bamberg October 2016, ISBN 978-3-931432-39-3, p. 88–91.
- Auf den Bühnen des Mittelalters Zuhause. Walter von der Vogelweide and Wolfram von Eschenbach. In: Jahrbuch der Erzdiözese Bamberg, 93. Jahrgang 2018. Heinrichs-Verlag Bamberg 2017, p. 58–62.
- Klangrede: Sonnengesang des Franziskus – Echo oder Leitmelodie? In: Stefan Kopp, Joachim Werz (Hg.): Gebaute Ökumene. Botschaft und Auftrag für das 21. Jahrhundert? Reihe: Theologie im Dialog. Verlag Herder, Freiburg 2018, ISBN 978-3-451381881, p. 297–333.
- Zwischen Magie und Zeitmanagement – die Glocken. In: Jahrbuch der Erzdiözese Bamberg 2021. Heinrichs-Verlag Bamberg, issue 96, June 2020, p. 48–57.

== Selected compositions ==
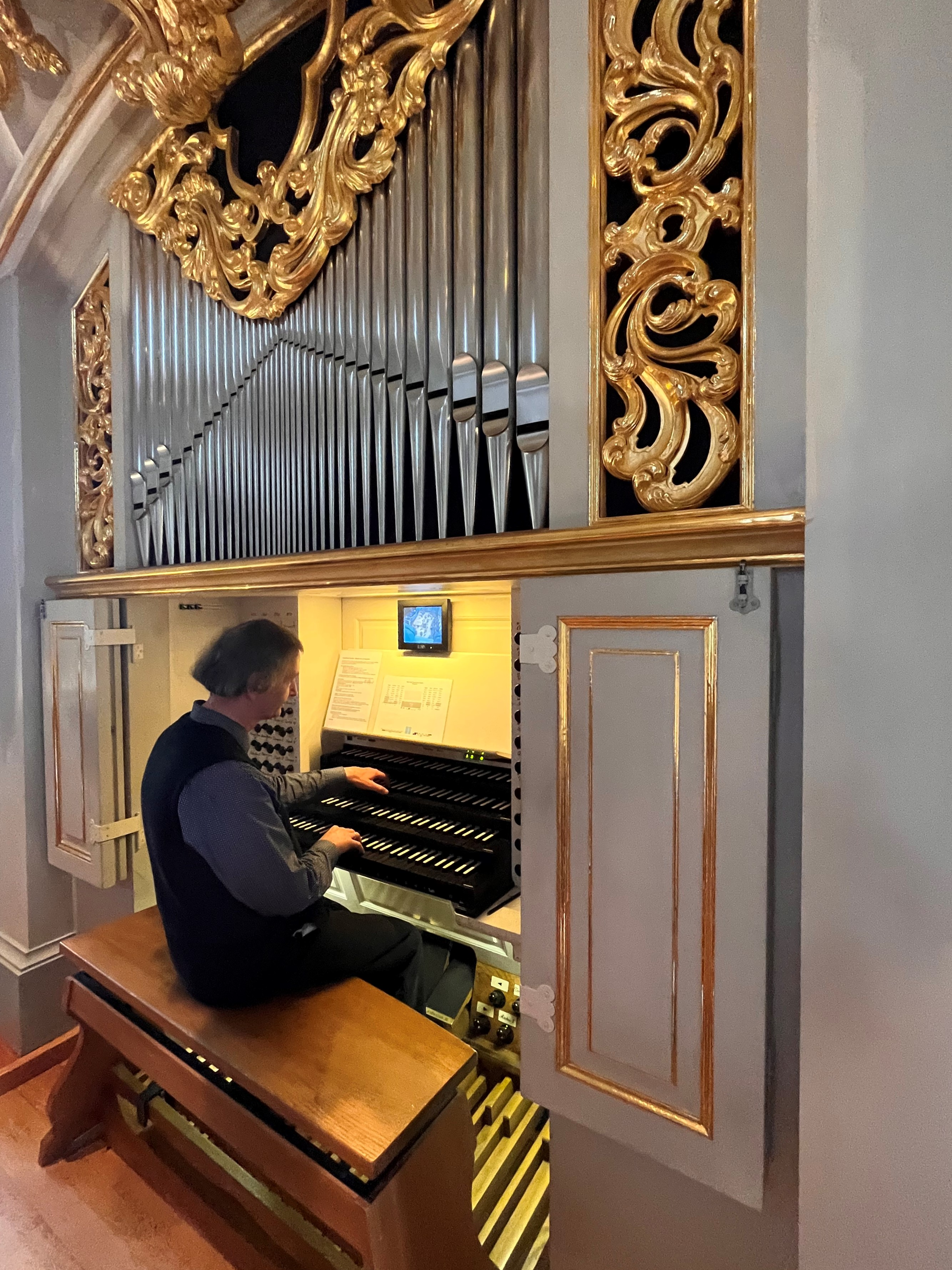
Ludger Stühlmeyer at the organ of Frauenkirche, Dresden (2022)

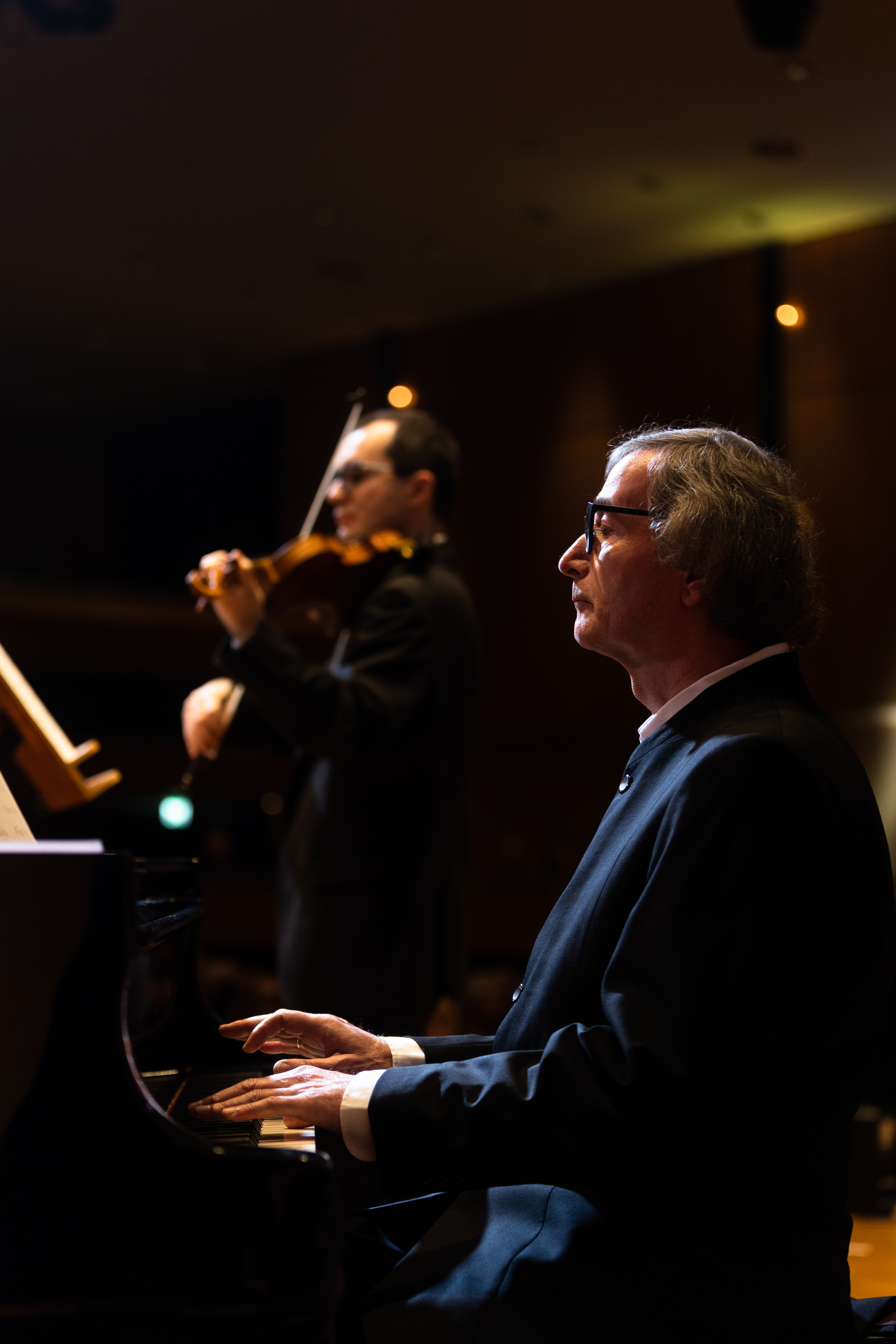
Ludger Stühlmeyer and concertmaster Lorenzo Lucca in the Freiheitshalle (2023)

- Mache dich auf, werde licht. 1989. Advent cantata for children's choir, vocals solo, narrators and instruments. First performance: December 1989. Excerpt in: Kommt wir gehen nach Bethlehem. Deutsches Liturgisches Institut (Editor): Trier 1996.
- Die Legende von den drei weisen Königen. 1998. For children's choir and piano/organ, text: Rolf Krenzer. First performance: January 10, 1999, ZDF, theme song of the German caroller event. In: Heinrichsblatt no. 1, Bamberg January 2011, p. 13.
- Wer glaubt kann widerstehn. 1999. Bernhard-Lichtenberg-Cantata for narrators, vocals solo, choir SATB and instruments. First performance: October 31, 1999, ZDF, Konzertchor der Hofer Symphoniker.
- Quatre pièces pour Orgue: Prélude romantique, Caprice expressionique, Hymne impressionique, Fugue baroque. 2001. First performance during the festival Tage neuer Kirchenmusik Bayern, October 2006. Edition Musica Rinata, Berlin 2013, ISMN 979-0-50235-058-1. Dedicated to Abbess Clementia Killewald.
- Wir bauen unsre Kirche neu. 2002. For vocals solo, choir SATB, instruments solo and piano/organ, text: Rolf Krenzer. In: Musica sacra, 132. Jg., issue 4, Bärenreiter-Verlag Kassel 2012, p. 13–15, ISSN 0179-356X.
- Atme in mir. 2002. For vocals solo and organ, text: Augustinus von Hippo. First performance: April 27, 2002, Stiftsbibliothek St. Gallen, Augustinus, Afrikanitaet Universalitaet. Autograph Stiftsbibliothek St. Gallen.
- Unsere Hoffnung. 2004. For vocal solo, solo instrument and piano/Orgel, text: Alois Albrecht. First performance: Mai 2, 2004 German-Czech cultural exchange.
- Die Nacht ist vorgedrungen. 2005. Choral-Cantata for vocals solo, Violin and piano/orgen, text: Jochen Klepper. First performance: January 20, 2005. Dedicated to Bundespräsident Prof. Dr. Horst Köhler.
- Transfiguration. 2010. For vocal solo, choir SATB and organ, text: Lk.9,28–36.
- Veni Creator Spiritus. 2011. Motet for choir SATB, text: Rabanus Maurus. In: Cantica nova. Zeitgenössische Chormusik für den Gottesdienst. Choirbook of ACV, Regensburg/Passau 2012, ISBN 978-3-00-039887-2, no. 59.
- Puer natus in Betlehem. Puer natus, Gott wird Mensch. 2011. For choir and organ.
- O splendidissima gemma. 2012. For vocals solo and organ, text: Hildegard of Bingen. Commissioned composition for the levying Hildegards of Bingen as doctor of the church. In: Ein Hofer Königspaar. Rondeau Production, Leipzig 2012.
- Conditor alme siderum. 2012. For choir SAM, text: Rabanus Maurus. In: Passauer Chorbuch, Bärenreiter-Verlag, Kassel 2012, ISMN 979-0-006-54215-4, p. 2f.
- Atem Gottes hauch mich an. 2013. For vocals solo and piano/organ, text: Dorothee Sölle. Commissioned by Freundeskreis der Evangelischen Akademie Tutzing on the occasion of the tenth anniversary of the death of Dorothee Sölle. First performance: April 27, 2013.
- Zum Engel der letzten Stunde. 2013. For vocals solo alto, violin and organ, text: Jean Paul (from: Das Leben des Quintus Fixlein). Commissioned by Stadt Hof. First performance: September 2013, Zene Kruzikaite (alto), Jens Wilckens (violin), Eva Gräbner (organ), Hof September 2013.
- Singt dem König Freudenspalmen. 2014. Motet for choir SATB. First performance: Kammerchor Wernigerode December 20, 2014. Sonat-Verlag Kleinmachnow 2015, ISMN 979-0-50254-002-9.
- Johannes-Passion. 2014. For choir SATB vocals solo SATB, texts after: Joh. 18, 1–19, 42. First performance: Capella Mariana April 2014. Berliner Chormusik-Verlag, Berlin 2014, ISMN 979-0-50235-210-3.
- Klangrede – Sonnengesang des Franziskus. 2015. For choir SATB and instruments. First performance: Capella Mariana October 4, 2015. Suae Sanctitati Papae Francisci dedicat. In: Gebaute Ökumene. Botschaft und Auftrag für das 21. Jahrhundert? series Theologie im Dialog. Schnell & Steiner, Regensburg 2018, ISBN 9-783451-381881, S. 297–333.
- In dulci jubilo. Aus-Flüge für Querflöte solo. 2015. Commissioned by Anja Weinberger. First performance: Dezember 9, 2015, Augustinerkirche Würzburg. Sonat-Verlag Kleinmachnov 2015, ISMN 979-0-50254-034-0.
- Ave Maria. 2016. For vocals solo and piano/organ. First performance: May 22, 2016 by Michéle Rödel. Sonat-Verlag Kleinmachnow 2016, ISMN 979-0-50254-085-2.
- Brannte uns nicht das Herz. 2016. Text: Lk 24,32. For choir SATB, flute/violin, organ and Bass. Setting of the dedication quote for the Deacon-consecration in the cathedral of Osnabrück on April 16, 2016.
- Seht den Stern, den wir euch bringen. 2016. Star singer song for choir and instruments, text Peter Gerloff. First performance: January 6, 2017.
- Gott sei gelobet und gebenedeiet. 2017. For vocals solo and piano/organ. Text: Martin Luther, for the Luther year. First performance: May 2007.
- Kreuzigen. 2017. For vocals solo and piano/organ, text: Dorothee Sölle. First performance: March 19, 2017.
- With hearts renewed. Motet for choir SATB and instruments, text: Jack May. 2017. Dedicated to the Westminster Cathedral Choir of London.
- Hymn. 2017. Motet for choir a cappella SSAATTBB, lyrics from a poem by Edgar Allan Poe. Dedicated to Matthias Grünert, the cantor of the Frauenkirche Dresden.
- Gerechter unter den Völkern. Vesper zu Ehren des seligen Bernhard Lichtenberg. Mit einer Biografie und Zitaten. Geleitwort von Nuntius Eterovic. Verlag Sankt Michaelsbund, Munich 2017, ISBN 978-3-943135-90-9.
- Choralfantasie Es ist ein Ros entsprungen. 2018. For vocals solo and organ. Dedicated to Aki Yamamura. First performance: December 24, 2018.
- Super flumina Babylonis [An den Wassern zu Babel] (Introduzione, Scontro, Elegie, Appassionato). 2019. Fantasia for organ on an aquarelle by Paul Klee.
- Who done it. 2019. For vocal solo, violin and piano, text: Lea Stühlmeyer.
- Du religiniai eilėraščiai: Malda and Dievo meilė. 2020. For vocals solo and piano/organ. Text: Maironis.
- Zehn Choralfantasien zum Weihnachtsfestkreis. 2020. For vocals solo, violin and organ. Commissioned by Santa Maria dell’Anima in Rome. Ries & Erler, Berlin 2020, ISMN 979-0-50254-149-1.
- Der Weihnachtsstern. A symphonic poem. 2020. Commissioned by Lorenzo Lucca (Hofer Symphoniker).
- Gib Frieden, Gott, zu unsrer Zeit. 2020. Text: Detlev Block. Motet for choir (SATB).
- Una rosa, Fantasie in four parts, [Con anima, Intermezzo (Minuetto), Adagio, Allegro assai]. 2021. Dedicated to Lorenzo Lucca. First performance: January 2021. Ries & Erler, Berlin 2021, ISMN M-013-00153-8.
- Wär᾽ ich ein Stern. 2025. For vocals solo baritone, violin and piano, text: Jean Paul (from: Flegeljahre). Commissioned by Stadt Hof.

== Edition of scores ==
- Dieterich Buxtehude. Präludium g-Moll. Sonat-Verlag, Kleinmachnow 2015, ISMN 979-0-50254-032-6.
- Dieterich Buxtehude. Nun lasst uns Gott dem Herren Dank sagen. Kantate für Chor SATB, zwei Violinen und B. c., BuxWV 81. Sonat-Verlag, Kleinmachnow 2016, ISMN 979-0-50254-064-7.
- Heinrich Stühlmeyer: „Christ ist erstanden“ for choir SATB, „Das Banner ist dem Herrn geweiht“ for choir SATB, „Der Satan löscht die Lichter aus“ for choir SATB, „Ist das der Leib, Herr Jesus Christ“ for choir SATB. 2018.

== Discography ==
- Ein Hofer Königspaar. Die Orgeln in St. Marien und St. Michaelis. Rondeau Production, Leipzig 2012.
- Zum Engel der letzten Stunde. Jean Paul – Ludger Stühlmeyer. Zene Kruzikaite (Alt), Jens Wilckens (Violine), Eva Gräbner (Orgel). Balderschwang 2013.

== Sources ==
- Dorothea Weiler, Den Glauben der Gemeinde in Musik umsetzen (portrait). In: Heinrichsblatt, Katholische Wochenzeitung des Erzbistums Bamberg, Heinrichs-Verlag Bamberg, no. 24, June 15, 1997.
- Gert Böhm, Prägende Jahre zwischen Oper, Schiffshupen und Benediktinern (portrait). In: Frankenpost, Hof, May 14, 2005.
- Lukas Spranger, Musik in Hof – eine Erfolgsgeschichte. Das gab es noch nie: Kantor Ludger Stühlmeyer erzählt die vollständige Musikgeschichte der Stadt. In: Frankenpost, Hof, August 28, 2010.
- Barbara Stühlmeyer, Den richtigen Ton treffen – Betrachtung über das Lied "Es sah'n drei weise Könige" von Rolf Krenzer und Ludger Stühlmeyer. In: Heinrichsblatt, Katholische Wochenzeitung des Erzbistums Bamberg, Heinrichs-Verlag Bamberg, no. 1, January 2, 2011.
- Beate Franck, Musiker für den Wohlklang des Gotteslobes. In: Frankenpost, Hof, July 31, 2011.
- Christoph Plass, Stühlmeyer wird Musikdirektor. In: Frankenpost, Hof, April 29, 2013.
- Andreas Kuschbert, Großer Einsatz für neue Musik. In: Heinrichsblatt, Katholische Wochenzeitung des Erzbistums Bamberg, Heinrichs-Verlag Bamberg, no. 21, May 26, 2013.
- Theresa E. Ryen, Gotteslob in dunkler Zeit. Ein neues Lied von Ludger Stühlmeyer zum 70. Todestag des seligen Bernhard Lichtenberg. In: Heinrichsblatt, Katholische Wochenzeitung des Erzbistums Bamberg, Heinrichs-Verlag Bamberg, no. 43, October 2013.
- Maria Palmer, Wegweiser wahrnehmen. Das Dreikönigslied „Seht den Stern, den wir euch bringen“ von Peter Gerloff und Ludger Stühlmeyer. In: Heinrichsblatt, Katholische Wochenzeitung des Erzbistums Bamberg, Heinrichs-Verlag Bamberg, no. 1, January 1, 2017, p. 13.
- Ute van der Mâer: Bis orat qui cantat. Festschrift zum 60. Geburtstag von Ludger Stühlmeyer. Norderstedt 2021, ISBN 978-3-7543-9507-3.
