= Hofer Symphoniker =

German symphony orchestra

Hof Symphony Orchestra
- Orchestra
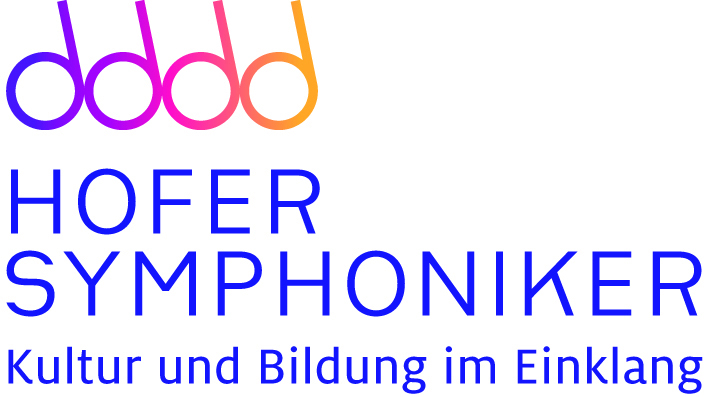
- Native name: Hofer Symphoniker
- Founded: 1945
- Location: Klosterstraße 9–11; 95028 Hof; Germany
- Concert hall: Freiheitshalle
- Principal conductor: Martijn Dendievel (from season 2024/25)
- Website: hofer-symphoniker.de

Hofer Symphoniker (Hof Symphony Orchestra) is a German symphony orchestra based in Hof, Bavaria, Germany. The orchestra began its performing activity in 1945, when Kapellmeister Karl F. Keller founded it as Hofer Konzertorchester.

As a concert orchestra, Hofer Symphoniker gives concerts at Freiheitshalle Hof, an event building and concert hall, as well as at several locations in the region of Upper Franconia. The orchestra worked together with artists like Elīna Garanča, Mojca Erdmann, Julia Fischer, Hilary Hahn, Daniel Hope, Albrecht Mayer, Daniel Müller-Schott, Martin Stadtfeld and Jörg Widmann. The orchestra also performs regularly at Thurn und Taxis Castle Festival in Regensburg with singers like José Carreras, Lucia Aliberti and Jonas Kaufmann.

As a theatre orchestra, Hofer Symphoniker performs at Theater Hof which was newly built in 1994. It is the orchestra's home venue where it plays operas, operettas, musicals and ballets. The theatre also serves as a multi-purpose venue for drama productions and other performances.

In 1978, Hofer Symphoniker opened its own music school, used to train future talents. As such, the Hofer Symphoniker Music School is the only music school in Germany that is attached to a professional symphony orchestra. As a cultural and educational centre, the corporation includes also a Suzuki Academy and an Art School. An important award was the prestigious Echo Klassik Special Prize for youth education in 2010.

Since 2007, the International Violin Competition Henri Marteau, named after the famous violinist and violin teacher Henri Marteau, takes place under the sponsorship of the District of Upper Franconia and is being organized by Hofer Symphoniker every three years in Lichtenberg and Hof.

== Conductors ==
Chief conductors of Hofer Symphoniker were:

- 1945–1950: Karl F. Keller (Kapellmeister)
- 1950–1955: Karl Friderich
- 1955–1967: Werner Richter-Reichhelm
- 1967–1973: Peter Richter de Rangenier
- 1973–1974: Klaus Volk (temporary)
- 1974–1979: Lutz Herbig
- 1979–1980: Jaroslav Opěla (temporary)
- 1980–1985: Gilbert Varga
- 1985–1989: Sergio Cárdenas
- 1989–1996: Hikotaro Yazaki
- 1997–2001: Golo Berg
- from the season 24/25: Martijn Dendievel

From 2001 to 2023, guest conductors lead the orchestra instead of chief conductors. From 2010 to 2016, Swiss conductor Daniel Klajner was "Principal Guest Conductor". Since 2016, Hermann Bäumer is "Conductor in Residence" and will finish this role in 2025 after Martijn Dendievel's first season as chief conductor.
Since 2003, Enoch zu Guttenberg is Conductor Laureate.

== General managers ==
- 1946−1965: August Mayer-Pabst was the orchestra's first general manager.
- 1965−2008: Wilfried Anton was largely responsible for the reputation and success of the current cultural and educational corporation Hofer Symphoniker gGmbH. For his achievements, Anton was appointed "Honorary General Manager" on November 20, 2015.
- 2009-2022: Ingrid Schrader develops the corporation further.
- 2022–present: Cora Bethke (artistic intendant) and Oliver Geipel (financial manager) form the newly established double leadership (Doppelspitze).

== Sources ==
- Ludger Stühlmeyer, Hofer Symphoniker. In: Curia sonans. Die Musikgeschichte der Stadt Hof. Eine Studie zur Kultur Oberfrankens. P. 277ff. Phil. Diss., Bayerische Verlagsanstalt Bamberg 2010, ISBN 978-3-89889-155-4.
