= Giuseppe Pianese =

Giuseppe Pianese (19 March 1864 – 22 March 1933) was an Italian pathologist and anatomist. He served as a professor of anatomy at the University of Naples and was among the first to identify changes in the size and number of nucleoli of cancerous cells. He was noted for his staining techniques and several of these are still in use.

== Biography ==
Pianese was born in Civitanova del Sannio, Campobasso, where his father Francesco was a notary. His mother Maddalena was a sister of Antonio Cardarelli. He studied at the Royal Liceo Classico and then graduated in surgery from Naples (1887) and became a physician in Carovilli. He then became interested in research and worked at the Anatomical Pathological Institute, Napes, under Otto von Schrön from 1890. He became a lecturer in pathological anatomy from 1899 and in 1902 he moved to Turin as a professor. In 1910 he became a professor of pathological anatomy and succeeded Schrön at Naples in 1917.

Pianese was a specialist in microscopic techniques and used innovative methods to fix using cobalt salts and stain specimens. His nucleolus staining technique is still in use. Pianese III-B a six stain mixture developed by Pianese in 1896 for use in studying cancer cells but is also used for separating fungal tissue from plant cells. In 1893 he noticed a parasite in the spleen tissue from a child which was later identified as Leishmania. Pianese observed that hypertrophic and irregularly shaped nucleoli were associated with cancer.

Pianese served as a member of parliament for one term in 1904. He was appointed to the Italian Academy in 1932. He took an interest in music and was a gifted violinist who performed along with his wife who was a pianist.
