= Hochfranken =

Region of Bavaria

Hochfranken (English: High Franconia) is a region in north-eastern Bavaria and is part of Upper Franconia (Oberfranken). It comprises the district and town of Hof as well as the district of Wunsiedel.
