= Otto von Schrön =

German pathologist (1837–1917)

Otto von Schrön (7 September 1837 – 13 May 1917) was a German physician and epidemiologist born in Hof, Bavaria. He served as a professor of anatomy at the University of Napoli.

== Biography ==
From 1855, he studied medicine at the University of Erlangen and the Ludwig-Maximilians-Universität München. After obtaining his medical degree, he relocated to Italy, working at the University of Turin and the University of Pavia. In 1864, he became a professor of pathological anatomy at the University of Napoli.

While still a student, he took part in Karl Thiersch's research that demonstrated the epithelial origin of cancer. He performed histological and histopathological studies of the skin and was the first scientist to discover desmosomes and the tonofilament system, but was unable to identify the role these structures played from a physiological basis.

During the early part of the century, Schrön claimed that there were pathological differences between tuberculosis and lung phthisis, asserting the existence of a phthisiogenous microbe.

For his accomplishments in his work against cholera, typhoid and other infectious diseases, in 1863 he was proclaimed "Cholera-Kommissar" in Naples, and in 1869 became an honorary citizen of the city. In 1883, he was ennobled by King Ludwig II of Bavaria, and awarded with the "Order of Merit" of the Bavarian crown. Schrön died on 13 May 1917 in Naples. He was succeeded as professor of anatomy by Giuseppe Pianese, one of his students.

== Publications ==
- Sulla genesi dei microorganismi ed i loro prodotti di secrezione, 1892.
- Le due conferenze dimostrative ed una communicazione fasse a Napoli al congresso contro la tuberculosi nel, 1900.
- Biologia minerale, 1901.
- Il nuovo microbo della tisi, 1904.
- Der neue Microbe der Lungenphthise und der Unterschied zwischen Tuberkulose und Schwindsucht, 1904 - A new microbe for lung phthisis, and the differences between tuberculosis and phthisis.
