= Freiheitshalle =

Coordinates: 50°19′13″N 11°54′11″E

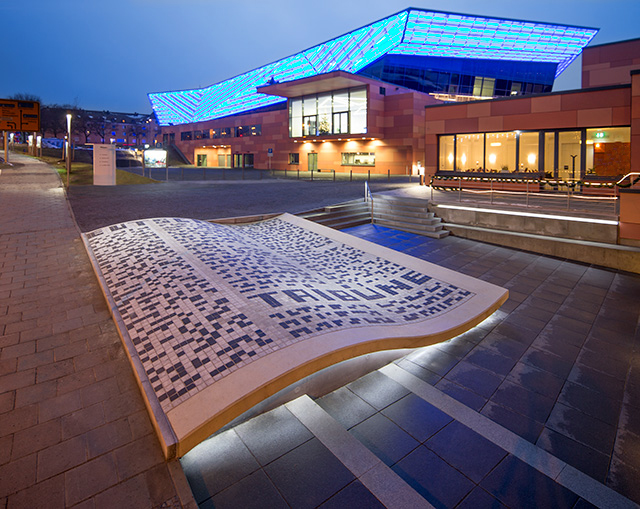
Freiheitshalle with monument "Deutsche Tribüne II"

The Freiheitshalle is a building in Hof, Bavaria, Germany.

Artists that have performed at the venue include Peter Maffay, Glenn Miller Orchestra, AC/DC, Queen, The Cross, Florian Silbereisen and Hofer Symphoniker, among others.
