= Hof, Bavaria =

Hof
- Town
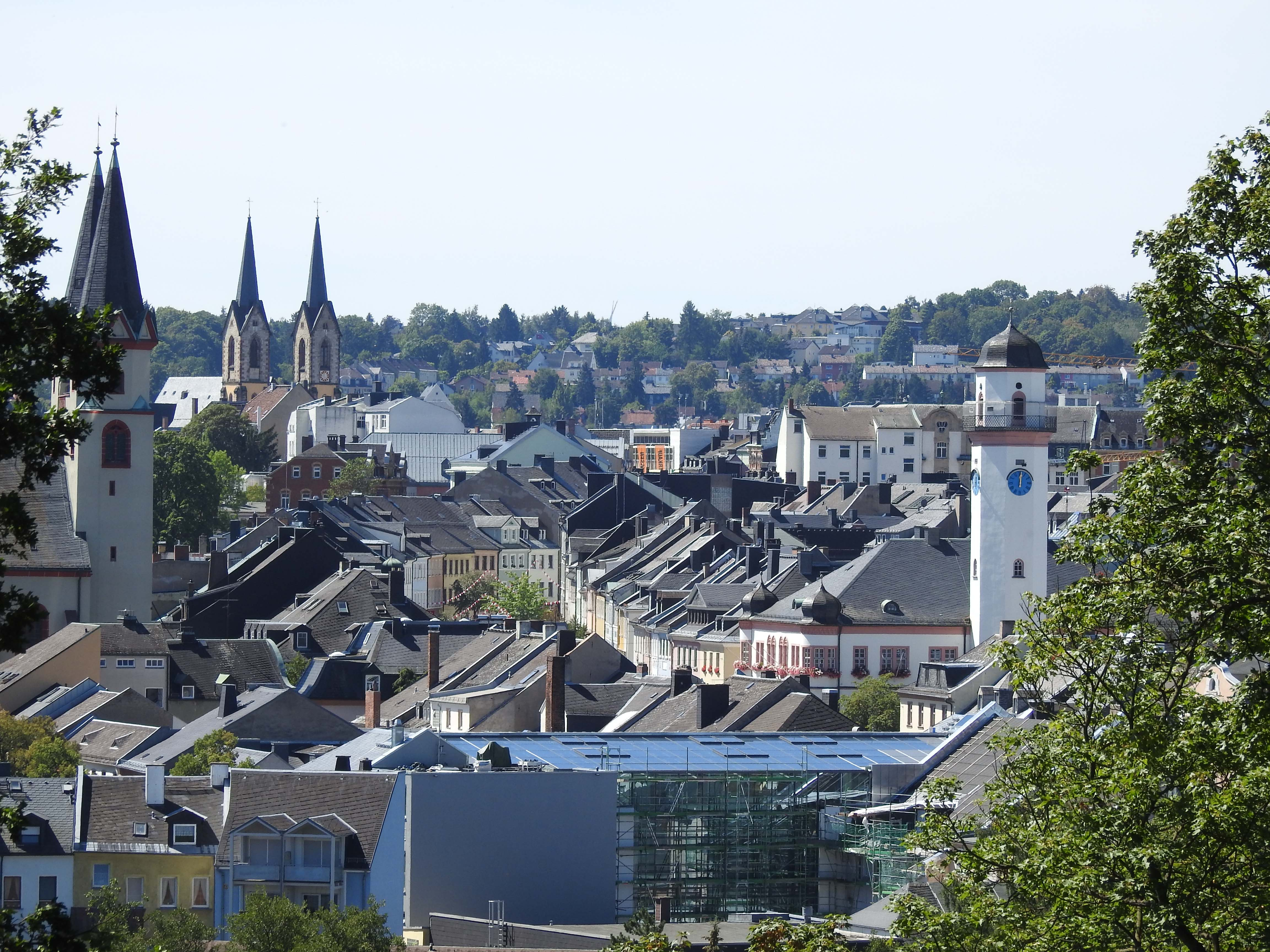
- View of the town centre

- Flag Coat of arms
- Interactive map of Hof
- Location within Germany Location within Bavaria
- Coordinates: 50°19′N 11°55′E
- Country: Germany
- State: Bavaria
- Admin. region: Upper Franconia
- District: Urban district

Government
  - Mayor (2026–32): Stefan Schmalfuß (CSU)

Area
  - Total: 58.02 km^{2} (22.40 sq mi)
- Elevation: 470–600 m (1,540–1,970 ft)

Population (2025-12-31)
  - Total: 46,624
  - Density: 803.6/km^{2} (2,081/sq mi)
- Time zone: UTC+01:00 (CET)
  - Summer (DST): UTC+02:00 (CEST)
- Postal codes: 95031-95032
- Dialling codes: 09281
- Vehicle registration: HO
- Website: www.hof.de

Hof (German pronunciation: [hoːf]) is a town on the banks of the Saale river in the northeastern corner of the Upper Franconia region of the German state of Bavaria. The town lies close to the Czech border and is in the forested Fichtel Mountains and Franconian Forest upland regions. The town has 47,296 inhabitants, the surrounding district an additional 95,000.

The town of Hof is enclosed by, but does not belong to the Bavarian district of Hof; it is nonetheless the district's administrative seat. The town's most important work of art, the Hofer altar, dates from about 1465 and is exhibited in the Alte Pinakothek in Munich today. The Heidenreich organ in the parish church of St. Michaelis, completed in 1834, is considered one of Bavaria's finest.

Hof is known for two local "delicacies", namely Schnitz, a kind of hotpot, and sausages boiled in a portable, coal-fired brass cauldron, which are sold in the streets by the sausage man (Wärschtlamo in the local dialect). There is also a particularly strong beer (Schlappenbier), which is available only on the first Monday after Trinity Sunday (Schlappentag). This tradition dates back to the establishment of the town militia which forced all shooters to take part in a special shooting training each year. To avoid penalties, a lot of shooters rushed out to the training area in the morning of the last possible day, without even enough time to get dressed and thus still wearing their clogs (German: Schlappen).

The Hof Theatre (Theater Hof) is a multi-purpose theatre whose construction was completed in 1994. It serves as an opera house and drama theatre, and hosts the city's ballet company and a youth theatre. The Hofer Symphoniker, Hof's symphony orchestra, plays as opera orchestra at the theatre and gives concerts at the Freiheitshalle Hof.

== Geography ==
=== Administrative divisions ===
The town of Hof consists of the following districts in particular:

- Altstadt ( = Old Town)
- Bahnhofsviertel
- Haidt
- Hofeck
- Eppenreuth
- Fabrikvorstadt
- Krötenbruck
- Leimitz
- Moschendorf
- Münster
- Neuhof
- Neustadt
- Jägersruh
- Gärtla
- Osseck
- Unterkotzau
- Vogelherd
- Vorstadt
- Wölbattendorf

=== Surroundings ===
Hof is located in between the areas of the Franconian Forest, the Fichtel Mountains and the Vogtland.

=== Climate ===
Hof has an humid continental climate (Köppen: Dfb; Trewartha: Dclo). Hof is located at an altitude of 565.2 metres (1,854 ft), which is much cooler than other areas in Bavaria. The average annual temperature ranges from −1 °C (30 °F) in winter to 17 °C (63 °F) in summer, and the annual precipitation is 712.6 mm (28.06 in).

The Hof weather station has recorded the following extreme values:

- Its highest temperature was 35.3 °C (95.5 °F) on 20 July 2022.
- Its lowest temperature was −27.0 °C (−16.6 °F) on 10 February 1956.
- Its greatest annual precipitation was 1,010.5 mm (39.78 in) in 1995.
- Its least annual precipitation was 388.2 mm (15.28 in) in 1953.
- The longest annual sunshine was 2,008.9 hours in 1959.
- The shortest annual sunshine was 1,247.5 hours in 1978.

Climate data for Hof (1991–2020 normals, extremes 1947–present)
Month	Jan	Feb	Mar	Apr	May	Jun	Jul	Aug	Sep	Oct	Nov	Dec	Year
Record high °C (°F)	13.4 (56.1)	17.1 (62.8)	21.4 (70.5)	28.2 (82.8)	29.9 (85.8)	34.5 (94.1)	35.3 (95.5)	35.2 (95.4)	31.0 (87.8)	25.1 (77.2)	16.9 (62.4)	13.7 (56.7)	35.3 (95.5)
Mean maximum °C (°F)	8.3 (46.9)	10.4 (50.7)	16.0 (60.8)	21.8 (71.2)	25.7 (78.3)	29.5 (85.1)	30.3 (86.5)	30.2 (86.4)	24.9 (76.8)	20.1 (68.2)	12.6 (54.7)	8.8 (47.8)	32.2 (90.0)
Mean daily maximum °C (°F)	1.0 (33.8)	2.4 (36.3)	6.9 (44.4)	12.6 (54.7)	16.9 (62.4)	20.2 (68.4)	22.4 (72.3)	22.3 (72.1)	17.3 (63.1)	11.6 (52.9)	5.5 (41.9)	1.8 (35.2)	11.8 (53.2)
Daily mean °C (°F)	−1.3 (29.7)	−0.6 (30.9)	2.8 (37.0)	7.6 (45.7)	11.9 (53.4)	15.2 (59.4)	17.2 (63.0)	16.9 (62.4)	12.4 (54.3)	7.8 (46.0)	2.9 (37.2)	−0.3 (31.5)	7.7 (45.9)
Mean daily minimum °C (°F)	−3.8 (25.2)	−3.6 (25.5)	−0.8 (30.6)	2.6 (36.7)	6.7 (44.1)	10.0 (50.0)	12.0 (53.6)	11.7 (53.1)	8.0 (46.4)	4.4 (39.9)	0.6 (33.1)	−2.5 (27.5)	3.8 (38.8)
Mean minimum °C (°F)	−13.7 (7.3)	−11.8 (10.8)	−7.3 (18.9)	−3.6 (25.5)	0.7 (33.3)	4.5 (40.1)	6.9 (44.4)	5.9 (42.6)	2.2 (36.0)	−2.3 (27.9)	−5.9 (21.4)	−10.7 (12.7)	−16.1 (3.0)
Record low °C (°F)	−24.7 (−12.5)	−27.0 (−16.6)	−24.1 (−11.4)	−11.6 (11.1)	−5.1 (22.8)	−1.6 (29.1)	1.2 (34.2)	1.0 (33.8)	−4.0 (24.8)	−10.5 (13.1)	−15.0 (5.0)	−25.4 (−13.7)	−27.0 (−16.6)
Average precipitation mm (inches)	55.3 (2.18)	46.0 (1.81)	49.3 (1.94)	38.5 (1.52)	58.8 (2.31)	69.5 (2.74)	86.6 (3.41)	75.3 (2.96)	61.4 (2.42)	55.5 (2.19)	54.7 (2.15)	61.7 (2.43)	712.6 (28.06)
Average extreme snow depth cm (inches)	17.7 (7.0)	18.1 (7.1)	9.6 (3.8)	1.5 (0.6)	0.1 (0.0)	0 (0)	0 (0)	0 (0)	0 (0)	0.8 (0.3)	6.5 (2.6)	11.7 (4.6)	26.7 (10.5)
Average precipitation days (≥ 0.1 mm)	11.9	9.7	10.9	8.7	9.8	10.4	11.5	9.8	9.2	9.8	10.5	12.4	124.5
Average snowy days (≥ 1.0 cm)	19.1	17.4	8.7	1.2	0	0	0	0	0	0.5	5.0	13.3	68.5
Average relative humidity (%)	89.8	85.6	80.9	73.0	72.2	72.6	71.9	72.3	80.1	86.7	91.6	91.7	80.7
Mean monthly sunshine hours	46.8	75.1	120.3	178.8	206.1	207.9	221.9	212.6	157.7	105.5	48.9	38.1	1,619.8
Source 1: NOAA
Source 2: DWD (extremes)

== History ==
=== Roman period ===
Varisci/Narisci Tribe during Roman Empire. Seen as 'Narister' on this map.

Hof in the Middle Ages was located in the Provincia Variscorum and was known in Latin as Curiae Variscorum or Curiae Nariscorum meaning "Court of the Varisci/Narisci." It is assumed then that Hof was the place where the chief(s) of the Varisci (or Narisci) tribe of the Suebi people held court (and/or perhaps a pagan temple or hall). The Varisci appear briefly in Tacitus' Germania (Chapter 42) as participants in the Marcomannic Wars. Their chief, Valao, was killed during battle around 167 AD and it is possible that these ancient peoples were then transplanted to Italy by Marcus Aurelius and lost their identity. A few centuries later (4th or 5th century) the obscure Armalausi peoples appear where the Varisci once lived, however the Latin name of Varisci stuck to the region. This is evidenced by nearby Plauen being called Plavia Variscorum and Hof: Curia Variscorum. The name Curiae Variscorum has been used to denote the city of Hof in numerous documents and publications throughout the years. This legacy remains even to this day as the word Hof is German for 'court', just as curiae is Latin for 'court'.

=== Sorbish-Frankish Conflicts (c. 600 – 1080) ===
Sometime around the 6th century AD the Slavic Sorbs began arriving near the Saale River which runs through Hof. They are first mentioned in 631 A.D., when Fredegar’s Chronicle described them as "Surbi" and as under the rule of a Dervan, an ally of Samo. The Frankish Kingdom of Charlemagne and his descendants were determined to Christianize the pagan Slavs and various campaigns were waged against them. The Annales Regni Francorum state that in 806 A.D. Sorbian Duke Miliduch fought against the Franks and was killed by Charles the Younger the son of Charlemagne around nearby modern-day Weißenfels.

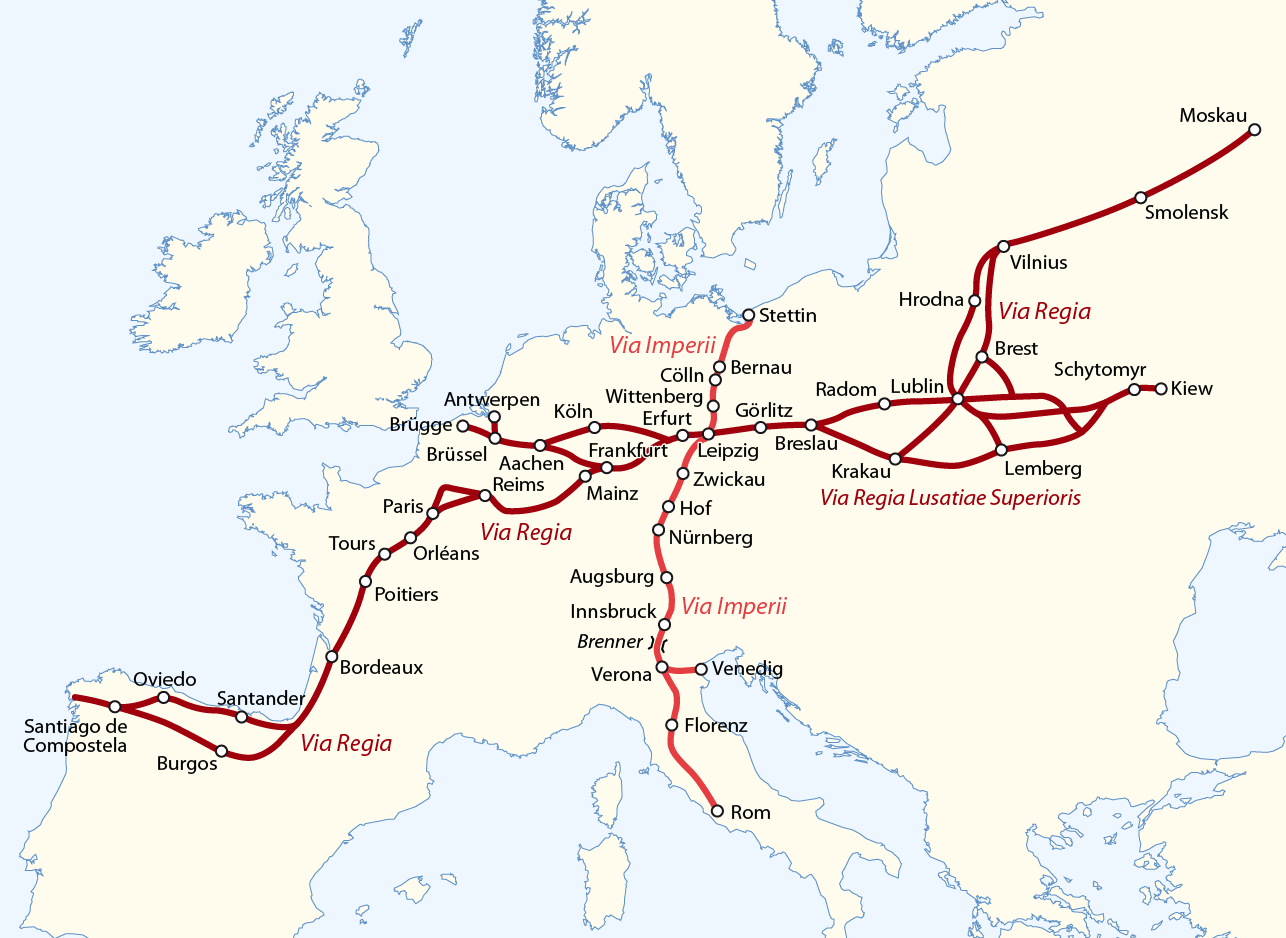
Hof (located between Zwickau and Nürnberg on this map) was on the Via Imperii.

The region where Hof is located first came under the ecclesiastic control of the Dioceses of Würzburg during this time period. Then in 1007 the region which contains Hof came under the Bishopric of Bamberg which was established out of the Dioceses of Würzburg to further spread Christianity throughout this area.

While the area around Hof remained terra incognita during this time period it was not isolated from the rest of the world. Although not home to a king or prince, Hof was on located on a somewhat protected, and very important trade route; the Via Imperii. This route led from Italy to the Baltic Sea and Hof was well situated to be a place of rest for travelers and traders as the flourishing markets of Leipzig, Zwickau, and Nuremberg began to develop. The budding mining industry of silver and tin from the nearby Ore Mountains would also contribute to the development of trade in this region.

=== Andechs-Merania and Vögte of Weida (1080–1373) ===
It appears that the missionary efforts of Bamberg were fairly successful in Hof as sometime around 1080 a group of farmers (possibly Sorbish) settled parts of modern-day Hof had built a chapel on Klausenberg an der Saale. They called their settlement "Rekkenze" which appears to be derived from the Western Slavic word Rekavica meaning "river." Rekkenze was first mentioned in a document written by one Pastor Albertus of St. Lorenzkirche in 1214 to the Bishop of Bamberg.

The Slavic language has left many marks on the geography of this region and to this day there are two waterways known as "Regnitz" near Hof: the Upper/Southern Regnitz (which flows in the south of Hof on the east side of the Saale River) and the Lower/Northern Regnitz (which flows in the north and east side of the Saale). Also of note, the area around Hof, the southern Bavarian-Bohemian part of the Vogtland, was known as the Regnitzland.

==== Rekkenze and other historic names of Hof ====
This Rekkenze settlement, which later became Hof, went by this and many other names through the years. For example, Hof is also called "curia Reckenize" (court of Reckenize) and "schlosz Reckenitz" (Castle Reckenitz) in a document of the Vögte of Weida in the year 1276. It has been suggested that the name "Hof" is the shortened form of Stadt am Regnitzhof meaning "City on the Court at the Regnitz". Other names for Hof have included: Curia Bavarica (Variscorum), Curiae Nariscorum, Curiae Regnitianae, Curiae Regnitianae ad Salam, Curiae Variscorum, Hoff, Hofii, Hof an der Saale, and Hoff im Voitlande to name but a few.

==== House of Andechs-Merania ====
In 1098 Count Berthold II of Andechs inherited his father's lands including those in modern-day Upper Franconia. In the 1130s he built Plassenburg Castle in Kulmbach and from 1137 he styled himself as 'Count of Plassenburg". He thus strengthened his influence in and around the nearby Regnitzland.

Around 1230, Count Berthold's great-grandson, the Crusader Duke Otto I von Andechs-Merania fortified the area north of the Rekkenze farming settlement (Altstadt) at the area downstream now known as Neustadt (New City).

==== Vögte of Weida ====
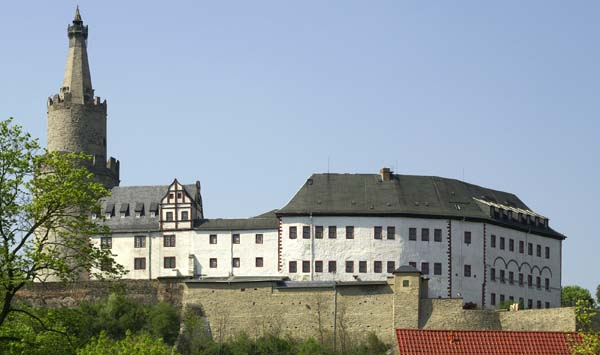
Castle Osterburg in Weida is considered the birthplace of the Vogtland which once ruled Hof.

By 1248 the royal house of Andechs-Merania dies out with Duke Otto II. Soon after the Vögte of Weida acquired the Regnitzland including Hof. Vogt Henry VIII of Weida (1258–1279) earned the city of Hof and Regnitzland. He was married to Sophie, daughter of Count Hermann II of Orlamünde and Beatrix of Andechs-Merania (daughter of Count Otto I).

Under the guidance of the Vögte of Weida the first city wall and the foundation of the poor hospital (Armenspitals) were built (c. 1260). Also, in 1270 there is the first mention of a castle at Hof and in 1278 the beginnings of the Klarissenkloster was established under the aid of the Vogt. The convent was blessed by the first Franciscan Pope Nicholas IV in 1291 and came under the Franciscan Monastery of the Holy Cross in 1292.

In 1299 75% of the city (both Old and New Hof) was destroyed by a fire and the population was left destitute. It took over 30 years to rebuild Hof, however during the rebuilding process (1319) the Vogt Heinrich XII the Younger (der Jüngere) of Weida (1302–1324) confirmed traditional rights and privileges upon the City of Hof. These rights officially made Hof a city.

In 1373, Vogt Heinrich XVI of Weida sold the Regnitzland to Burgrave Friedrich V of Nürnberg. However, due to this early history with the Vögte of Weida, Hof is still considered part of the geographical region known as the Vogtland. To this day the Wappen (Shield) of Hof has the lion of the Vögte emblazoned in remembrance of the fact it was once owned by the Vögte. The name of the Museum Bayerisches Vogtland in Hof today also pays homage to this history.

=== Brandenburg period (1373–1792) ===
Burgrave Friedrich V died on January 21, 1398, and his lands were split between his two sons, Johann III and Friedrich IV, thus creating what has been called the Principality of Bayreuth. Hof was under this Hohenzollern Principality until December 2, 1791, and during this time was known as the Hochfürstlich-Brandenburgische Hauptstadt Hoff im Voigtlande (the "Princely Brandenburg capital city of Hof in the Vogtland").

==== Hussite Wars (1419–1434) ====
Close to the end of the Hussite Wars (between the 4th and 5th Crusade against them) Hof was sacked by the Hussite followers of Jan Hus. In 1430, during the period the Hussites called the Spanilé jízdy (or "beautiful rides") they raided and devastated the city of Hof. on 25 January they burnt Plauen and then turned their attention to Hof. From the end of January into February they attacked and finally broke through killing many Hofers and looted and burned Hof. They also took away inhabitants of Hof as booty.

==== Rebuilding of Hof ====
In 1432 a militia was organized to defend Hof. The organization of this Shooter's Guild is still celebrated in Hof annually in festival called Schlappentag [see description above].

in 1464 the Hospital and Hospital Church (Hospitalkirche) were rebuilt.

1487 a foundation in Niclaskirche for pilgrims on the Jacobsweg was built near the modern day St. Marienkirche. Jacobsweg is part of the famous Camino de Santiago which ends in at Cathedral of Santiago de Compostela in Galicia, Spain. There is a plaque on the wall of Marienkirche that commemorates this pilgrim inn that is now lost.

In 1498 a watch tower was constructed to add to the defences of Hof.

==== Reformation ====
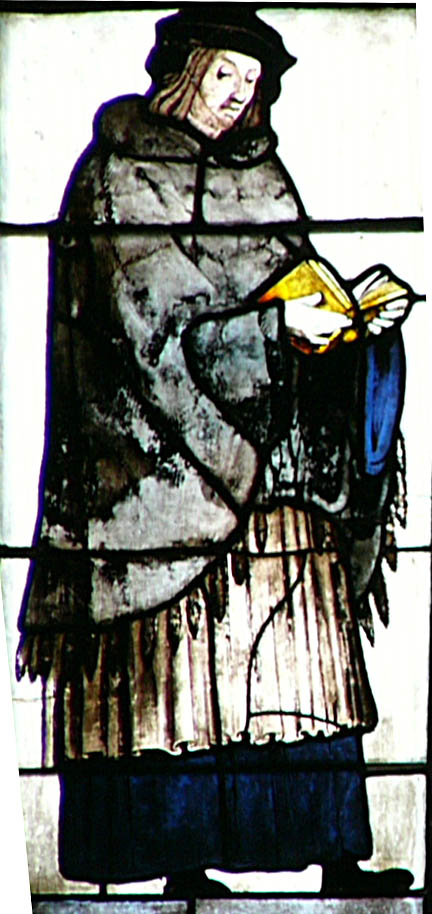
Friedrich von Brandenburg was the head pastor of Hof during the Reformation and was often in conflict with his Protestant brother George "the Pious".

While 1517 brought the 95 Theses, the spark that ignited the Protestant Reformation, in Hof 1517 sparked a terrible fire that destroyed some 50 homes around the Orlaplatz and St. Michaeliskirche, severely damaging the rectory. The various churches and chapels in Hof at this time were all under the head pastor (German: Oberpfarrer) of Hof, Margrave Friedrich von Brandenburg of the Hohenzollern family. This family often fought amongst themselves during the reformation using religion to gain political power. Friedrich tended to side with the Catholic Church against his brother George "the Pious" who used the new Protestant religion to his advantage.

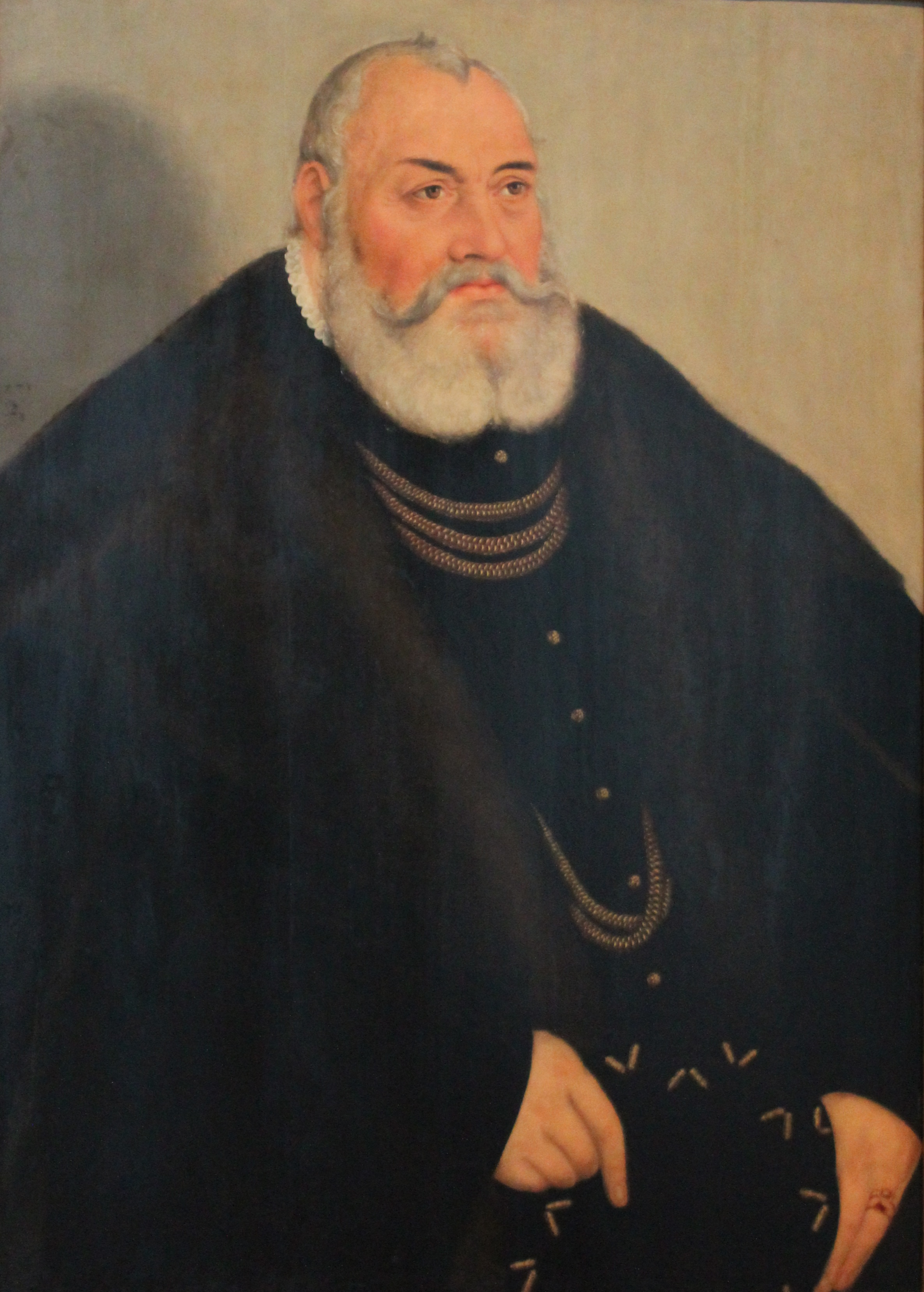
George von Brandenburg "the Pious" was the ruler of the lands which included Hof and was favorable to the Reformation and often in conflict with his more Catholic leaning brother Friederich.

In 1524, a reforming priest named Kaspar Löhner was reassigned from his preaching position at Kloster Birkenfeld, after complaints from the Abbess, and brought to Hof under Head Pastor Friedrich v. Brandenburg. Löhner had been performing Mass in German and singing German songs during the Mass. He arrived in Hof where his preaching continued to carry a certain reformation flavor. This is understandable given that he was a friend of Martin Luther who had accompanied him from Wittenberg and Augsburg in 1518.

Soon after Löhner arrived in Hof the radical lay-preacher from Zwickau, Nikolaus Storch, also arrived in Hof. According to the Hof chronicler Enoch Widmann, Storch was in Hof at the end of 1524 working as a weaver, but still preaching and gaining followers. Previously a co-worker with Thomas Müntzer, Storch is also considered a forerunner of the Anabaptist movement, because Widmann recorded him as having preached and practiced adult baptism in Hof. This was opposed by Löhner and others in Hof and towards the end of January in 1525 he applied to the mayor of Zwickau to be allowed to return there. This was refused and according to Philip Melancthon (letter to Joachim Camerarius, 17 April 1525) Storch played a leading role in the Peasants War of 1525.

Löhner's first stay in Hof was also short-lived and Head Pastor Friedrich von Brandenburg had him removed the year after he arrived (1525) and he was replaced by the Catholic priest Wolfgang Thech. On Easter of 1527 Thech had his beard and hair purposely set on fire by young men while he was impersonating Christ in a Harrowing of Hell re-enactment. Believing they had been taught to disrespect the priesthood by men like Löhner, Thech left Hof for Halle an der Saale.

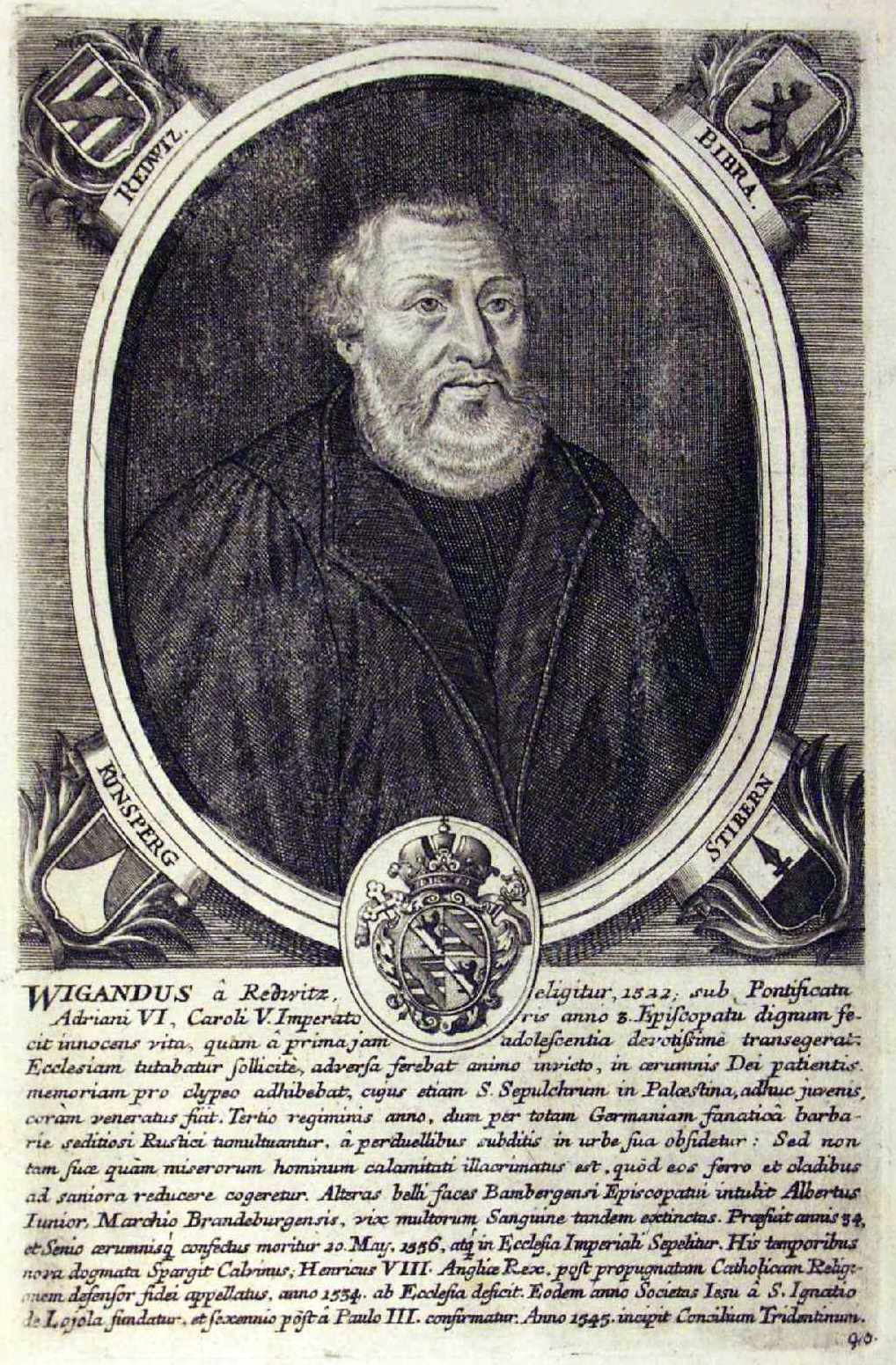
Bishop Weigand von Redwitz, Bishop of Bamberg whose jurisdiction included Hof during the Reformation

After time in Wittenberg (1526) and then Oelzntiz (1527) Löhner was then reinstated in 1528 in Hof by Friedrich's Lutheran brother the Margrave George the Pious. Löhner then returned to Hof in league with the Hof born theologian, mathematician, and school master Nikolaus Medler (who was also a student of Luther's). Together they more boldly introduced the Reformation. The first Evangelical (Lutheran) communion service in Hof was held by Löhner at St. Michaeliskirche on September 5, 1529. This public act marks a major turning point in which Hof began to assert itself as openly Lutheran against the jurisdiction of the Catholic Church. However, Löhner and Medler continued to face stiff opposition to these changes as their subsequent removal from Hof reveals.

Pastor Kaspar Löhner was a leading theologian and writer in his day and he wrote a church liturgy (German: Gottesdienstordnung), catechism, and a hymnal among other writings. While in Hof he married Margarethe Felitscher, daughter of the Mayor (Bürgermeister) of Hof Konrad Felitscher, and by which he became the father of John Joshua Löner and the great-grandfather of the famous Lutheran theologian and hymn writer Joshua Stegmann.

Löhner and Medler both continued to receive opposition from powerful individuals including the regional governor (German: Landhauptmann) Christoph von Beulwitz who was a supporter of the Bishop of Bamberg. Being acquainted with Martin Luther, both Pastor Löhner and Schoolmaster Medler asked him for advice concerning this opposition and received a letter from Luther addressed from Wittenberg on June 7, 1531, which encouraged them to stay. The letter begins:

"Martin Luther an die verehrten Brüder in Christo und treuen Bürger der Stadt Hof, Kaspar Löner, Pfarrer, und Nikolaus Medler, Schullehrer."

Translation: "[From] Martin Luther, to the venerable brothers in Christ and faithful citizens of the city of Hof, Kaspar Löner, Pastor, and Nicholas Medler, School Master."

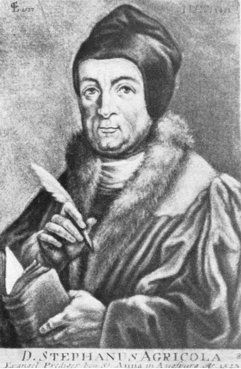
Theologian and reformer Stephan Agricola was a Protestant pastor at St. Michaeliskirche in Hof beginning in 1532.

However, the next month (13 July 1531) both Löhner and Medler were ousted from Hof. This is due to the fact that even though George the Pious was actively trying to introduce Protestantism into his lands, he was constantly opposed by his brother Friedrich who held numerous benefices in Hof. Also still holding great influence and power in and around Hof was the Bishop of Bamberg Weigand von Redwitz. These two were able to somewhat curb the influence of Margrave George the Pious and the reformers.

However, the next year, in 1532, George the Pious was able to obtain the famous theologian and reformer Stephan Agricola and assign him to St. Michaeliskirche in Hof. Also during the year 1532 there was public shock throughout Hof as a local noblewoman who had become a nun (Veronika von Zedtwitz) left the Poor Clares' cloister in Hof and broke her vows to marry the rector of the Gymnasium in Hof, Conrad Meyer. Pastor Agricola continued his influential ministry in Hof until 1542 and during his time as Hof's pastor he was present at the meeting of Lutheran theologians at Schmalkalden in 1537 and was a signer of the Schmalkaldic Articles written by Martin Luther.

It was during this time period that the Catholic population in Hof became severely limited, although it held on for a few more decades. In 1538 the Sigmundskirche was demolished and the St. Gangolf church was sold (and was later burned down and turned into barns). After the Franciscan monastery was abolished in Hof in 1564, Catholicism did not really regain ground in the city again until after Catholic Bavaria purchased Franconia in 1810. It wasn't until 1837 that the Catholic population of Hof received their own priest and 1844 until a small church was built (Marienkirche).

==== Margrave Albert Alcibiades ====
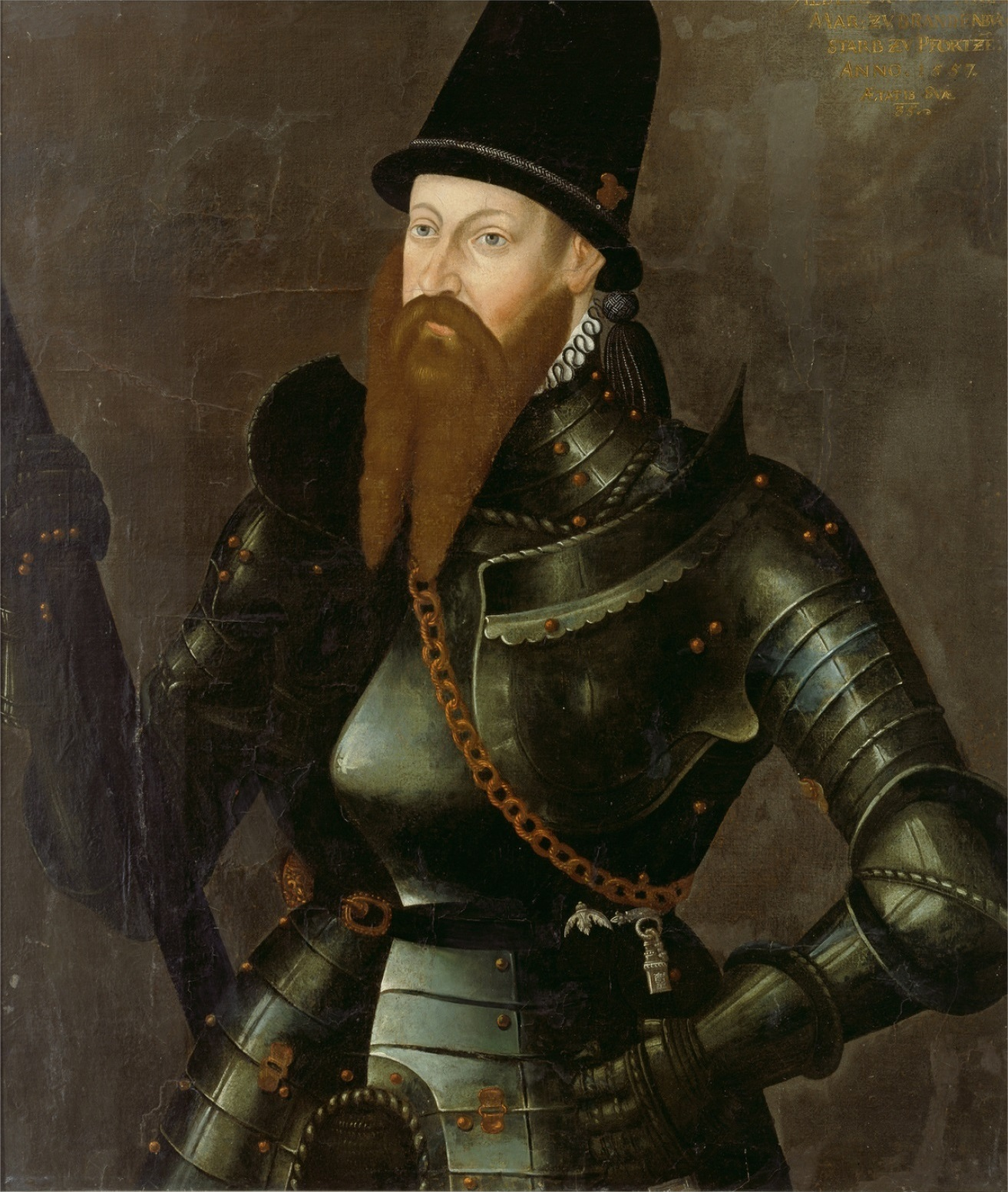
Margrave Albrecht von Brandenburg-Kulmbach was the nephew of both Head Pastor Friedrich von Brandenburg and George the Pious and a warrior-ruler over the lands which included Hof.

In 1546, Margrave Albert Alcibiades of Brandenburg-Kulmbach founded a Grammar School in Hof, which is today known as the Jean-Paul Gymnasium, in honor of the most famous student that attended there: Jean Paul Friedrich Richter. Jean-Paul Gymnasium is one of the oldest schools in Upper Franconia.

===== Siege of Hof =====
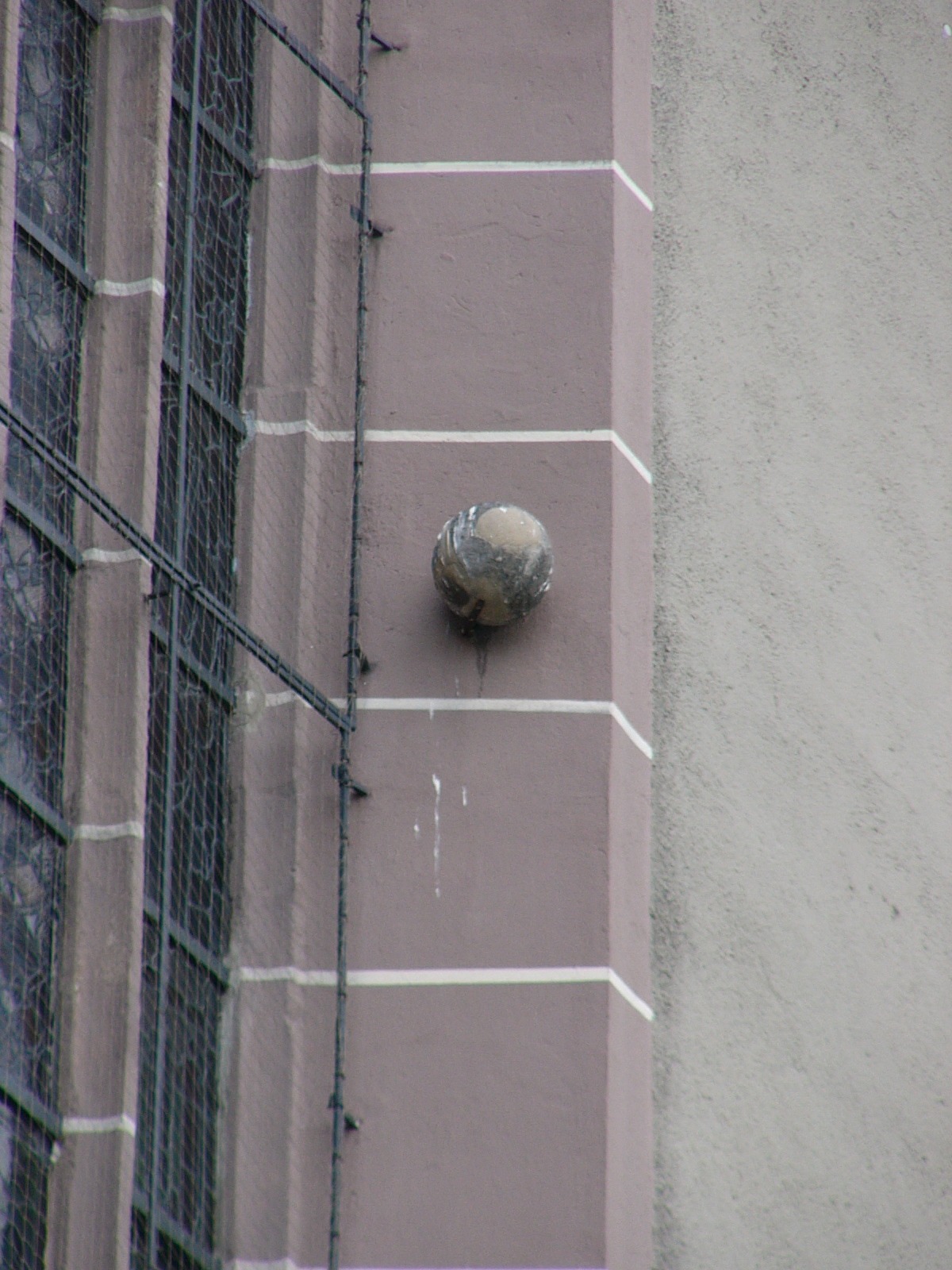
Cannonball from Siege of 1553 in tower of St. Michaeliskirche

On 7 August 1553, Hof came under a 7-week siege known as the Siege of Hof. The siege was one of the major battles of the Second Margrave War and Hof was finally taken from Margrave Albert Alcibiades by Heinrich IV of Plauen on 28 September 1553. Albert was able to briefly retake Hof on 11 October, but it fell back into the hands of those allied against Margrave Albert on 27 November. Some 18,236 stone cannonballs are said to have been shot into Hof during this siege with some cannonballs still visible today lodged in walls throughout Hof. For example, from the Saale River looking back one can still see a cannonball lodged in one of the towers of St. Michaeliskirche from the siege of 1553.

Aftermath: St. Lorenzkirche was looted and burned during the siege and the old Watch Tower was also burned out. The Hospitalkirche, which was used as a war camp by the attackers, was attacked and destroyed by the city's defenders. Also, the end of the last Roman Catholic stronghold in Hof; Das Kloster der Klarissen occurred during this siege as Abbess Amalie of Hirschberg escaped with her nuns to Cheb (Eger). The Cloister was looted and later turned into a school. After the siege, Henry IV briefly put Georg Wolf of Kotzau (who had once served Margrave Albert) in charge of the governance of Hof. Finally, Albert's cousin, Margrave Jürgen Friedrich of Brandenburg-Ansbach (reign of 1557–1603) took power and ruled over Hof and rebuilt it along with much of his Margraviate which had been ransacked during the war.

The noted artist Hans Glaser made a woodcut of the siege of Hof which is located in today in the Germanisches Nationalmuseum in Nürnberg.

==== Thirty Years War (1618–1648) ====
===== Regional Prelude: Brandenburg-Ansbach to Brandenburg-Bayreuth =====
After the death of the childless Margrave Jürgen Friedrich of Brandenburg-Ansbach in 1603, his margraviate was given to Karsten, the son of Elector Johann Jürgen of Brandenburg. This was done in accordance with House Treaty of Gera set in place in 1599 to provide for a peaceful transition of power to the heirless Jürgen Friedrich.

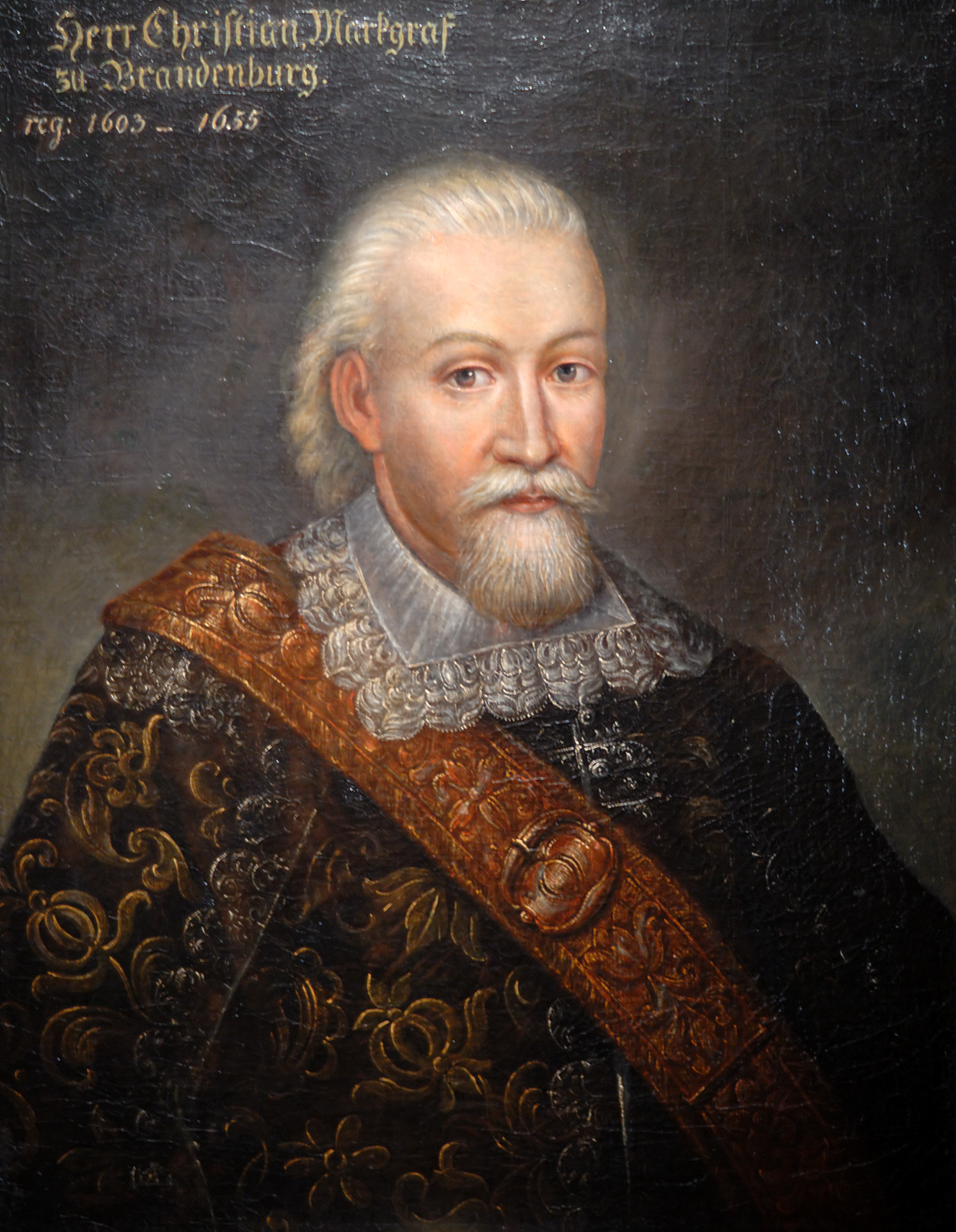
Karsten, Margrave of Brandenburg-Bayreuth at an older age

Margrave Karsten took power over Brandenburg-Ansbach after Jürgen Friedrich’s death in 1603. In 1604, he moved his capital from Kulmbach to Bayreuth, thus changing the name of the margraviate to Brandenburg-Bayreuth. This Margraviate had been a member of the Franconian Circle since 1500 and Margrave Karsten was elected Colonel (German: Kreisobrist) of the Franconian Circle in 1606. He was also one of the founding members of the Protestant Union founded in 1608 as a way of giving teeth to the Peace of Augsburg (1555). Karsten was Margrave of Brandenburg-Bayreuth which oversaw the governance of Hof when the 30 Years War broke out ten years later in 1618.

===== Fire of 1625 =====
On 6 November a fire broke out in Hof that destroyed 174 houses. Hof was again left destitute and it took 40 years before widespread re-construction could be financed. During this time period Hof was left vulnerable, especially to the pillaging of the mercenary Heinrich Holk's notorious cavalry unit, "Holk's Horse" (see below).

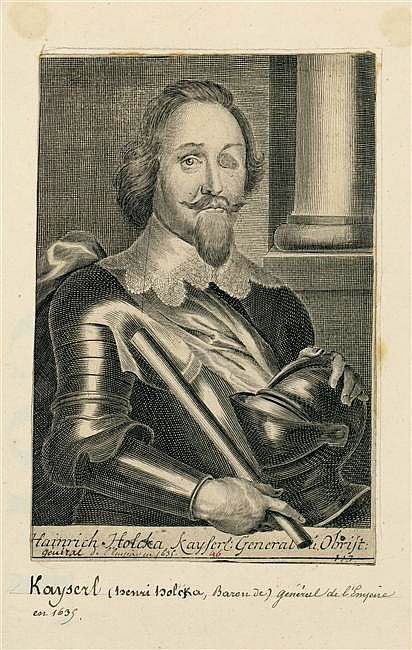
General Holk

===== Heinrich Holk's Raids =====
In 1632 and 33 Heinrich Holk's cavalry unit of Croatian and Polish forces ravaged the surrounding region, especially the neighbouring Electorate of Saxony. On 23 January 1633, 8 companies of Holk's Horse plundered Hof. The raiding, raping, looting and destruction continued also in later raids on 13 June and 11 August of the same year. Heinrich Holk's forces were politically stymied after the Battle of Lützen on 16 November.

===== Margrave Karsten in the war and aftermath =====
During the war, Margrave Karsten formed an alliance with Sweden, although the Swedes sacked Hof on 29 May 1640. Emperor Ferdinand II tried to depose him as ruler of Bayreuth in 1635; however, he continued in office. All of Europe was deeply affected by these wars. Disease, starvation, and warfare took a terrible toll on infrastructure, livestock, farmlands, and human dignity. After the 30 Years War it is estimated that one half of the population of Brandenburg was lost and in some areas as many as two-thirds. One can only imagine the joy when the wars ended and Margrave Karsten called a general festival of thanksgiving for peace which was celebrated throughout his Principality in February 1639. Hof seems to have recovered quickly under Margrave Karsten and it became a refuge for displaced Protestants, especially from Austria and Bohemia.

==== Postal link ====
In 1683 Hof became a link in the postal service between Leipzig and Nuremberg. The post came through twice a week. Postal links to Regensburg (1692) and to Dresden (1693) followed.

==== Fire of 1743 ====
In 1743 the Hof Castle burned down and was not rebuilt, although several walls of the castle are still visible in modern-day Hof.

=== Prussian rule (1791–1805) ===
Hof came under Prussian rule on 2 December 1791, when Margrave Karl Alexander, the last Margrave of Brandenburg-Ansbach and Brandenburg-Bayreuth, sold it to King Friedrich Wilhelm II of Prussia, a fellow member of the House Hohenzollern.

=== Napoleonic Conflicts (1805–1810) ===
On 3 November 1805 the Prussians had signed the Treaty of Potsdam, agreeing to enter the War of the Third Coalition against Napoleon if he didn't agree to peace within four weeks. This treaty came to nothing after the Battle of Austerlitz on 2 December 1805, when Napoleon decisively crushed the Third Coalition. This forced the Prussian envoy, Count Karsten of Haugwitz, to negotiate a treaty of friendship called the Convention of Schönbrunn (15 December 1805) proclaiming an alliance between Prussia and France. As part of this treaty Prussia was forced to give up Brandenburg-Ansbach.

In February 1806 Haugwitz went to Paris to ratify this Treaty of Schönbrunn and to attempt to secure some modifications in favour of Prussia. He was received with a storm of abuse by Napoleon, who insisted on tearing up the treaty and drawing up a fresh one, which doubled the amount of territory to be ceded by Prussia and forced her to a breach with Great Britain by binding her to close the Hanoverian ports to British commerce. The treaty, signed on 15 February, left Prussia wholly isolated in Europe and led Prussia into war with Napoleon later that year.

In the War of the Fourth Coalition (1806–1807) Hof was then briefly held by General Bogislav Friedrich Emanuel von Tauentzien of the Prussian Army. Tauentzein more or less abandoned Hof on 8 October 1806 and Hof was easily taken by light cavalry from Napoleon's Marshal General Jean-de-Dieu Soult's IV Corps that same day. Hof's geographic position made it an ideal 'jumping off' point of Napoleon's Campaign in Saxony which quickly resulted in the French-won Battle of Schleiz the next day and soon thereafter the famous Napoleon victory at the Battle of Jena.

Napoleon sold Hof to the Kingdom of Bavaria on 30 June 1810.

=== Bavarian rule (1810–1918) ===
==== Fire of 1823 ====
On 4 September 1823, the town was virtually destroyed by a fire as 9 out of 10 buildings were destroyed.

=== World War II ===
In 1945, Hof suffered minor destruction due to aerial attacks but by the end of 1945 housed twice its previous population, receiving German-speaking refugees from neighbouring Bohemia, where extensive ethnic cleansing of Czechoslovakia's German-speaking population was taking place.

=== Modern era ===
From 1945 to 1990 Hof was very close to the border between East Germany and West Germany. In 1989 thousands of East German citizens, who had demanded the right to travel or emigrate to West Germany and had been allowed to do so, first arrived on western soil at Hof's railway station, having been placed on a special train and officially "expelled" by the East German government. Hof is located near the old Berlin-Munich autobahn, which was thought to be a possible invasion route by Warsaw Pact forces had the Cold War ever escalated into armed conflict (see Fulda Gap).

- Largest groups of foreign residents
- Nationality: Population (2013)
Turkey	1,772
Romania	322
Ukraine	262
Poland	221
Italy	210

=== Population development ===
Year	Population
1818:	4,667
1840:	7,985
1880:	21,000
1900:	32,781
1920:	40,785

Year	Population
1939:	44,878
1945:	55,405
1950:	61,033
1955:	58,005
1960:	57,414

Year	Population
1965:	55,810
1970:	54,424
1975:	54,644
1980:	53,180
1985:	51,275

Year	Population
1990:	53,095
1995:	52,531
2003:	49,804
2004:	49,424
2006:	50,150

== Politics ==
=== Margraves of Kulmbach and Bayreuth ===
- 1398: Johann III of Nuremberg
- 1420: Friedrich I of Brandenburg
- 1440: Johann IV the Alchemist
- 1457: Albert I Achilles (also Margrave of Brandenburg from 1470)
- 1486: Siegmund
- 1495: Friedrich III (also Margrave of Ansbach as Friedrich I)
- 1515: Kasimir
- 1527: Albert Alcibiades
- 1553: Jürgen Friedrich (also Margrave of Ansbach)
- 1603: Karsten
- 1655: Karsten Ernst
- 1712: Jürgen Wilhelm
- 1726: Jürgen Friedrich Karl (previously Margrave of Kulmbach from 1708)
- 1735: Friedrich
- 1763: Friedrich Karsten
- 1769: Karsten Friedrich (to 1791; also Margrave of Ansbach)

=== Mayors (first mayors and lord mayors) ===
(since the introduction of the Bavarian Municipal Code in 1818)

1818–1846:	Georg Friedrich Samuel von Oerthel (d. 20 Mar 1846)
1847:	Johann Adam Laubmann (from 20 Jul 1847 – 25 Dec 1847)
1848–1849:	Christoph Theodor Gottlob Schrön (elected 7 Feb 1848)
1849–1857:	Moritz Ernst Freiherr von Waldenfels
1857–1882:	Hermann von Münch
1883–1903:	Carl von Mann
1904–1916:	Paul Bräuninger
1916–1919:	Heinrich Neupert
1919–1933:	Karl Buhl
1933–1941:	Richard Wendler
1945–1946:	Oskar Weinauer
1946–1948:	Hans Bechert
1948–1949:	Kurt Schröter
1950–1970:	Hans Högn (SPD)
1970–1988:	Hans Heun (CSU)
1988–2006:	Dieter Döhla (SPD)
2006–2020:	Harald Fichtner (CSU)
since May 2020:	Eva Döhla (SPD)

== Twin towns – sister cities ==
Hof is twinned with:

- Cheb, Czech Republic
- Joensuu, Finland
- Ogden, United States
- Plauen, Germany
- Villeneuve-la-Garenne, France
- Caruaru, Brazil

== Culture ==
=== Points of interest ===
- Botanischer Garten der Stadt Hof, a municipal botanical garden and the Hof Zoo, a zoological garden located on the Theresienstein, a hill near the downtown
- Freiheitshalle, event building
- St Mary's Cathedral, highest church of the town (65 meters high)
- St Michel's Cathedral, second largest church
- Untreusee, a lake in the south of the town

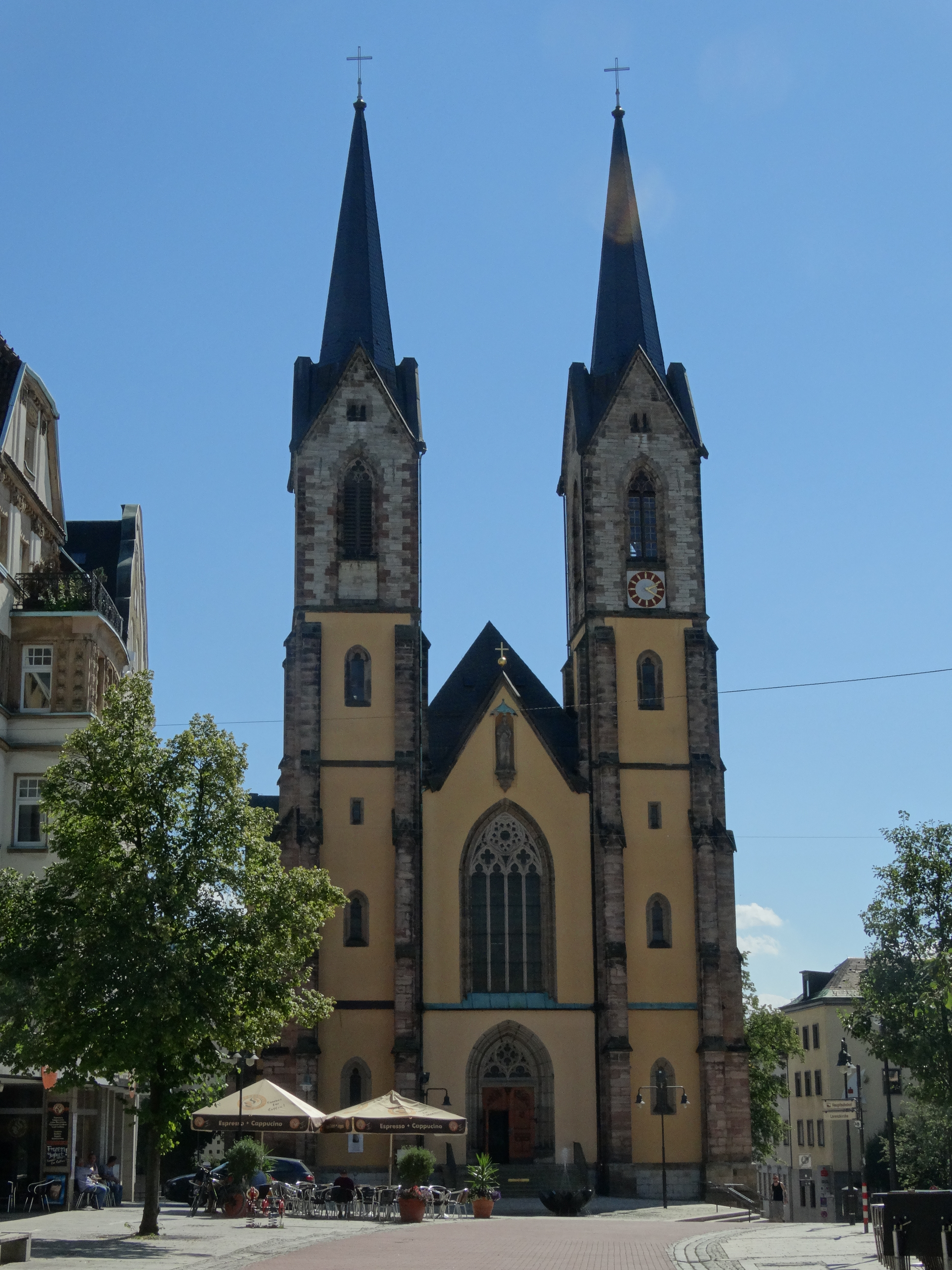
St Mary's Cathedral

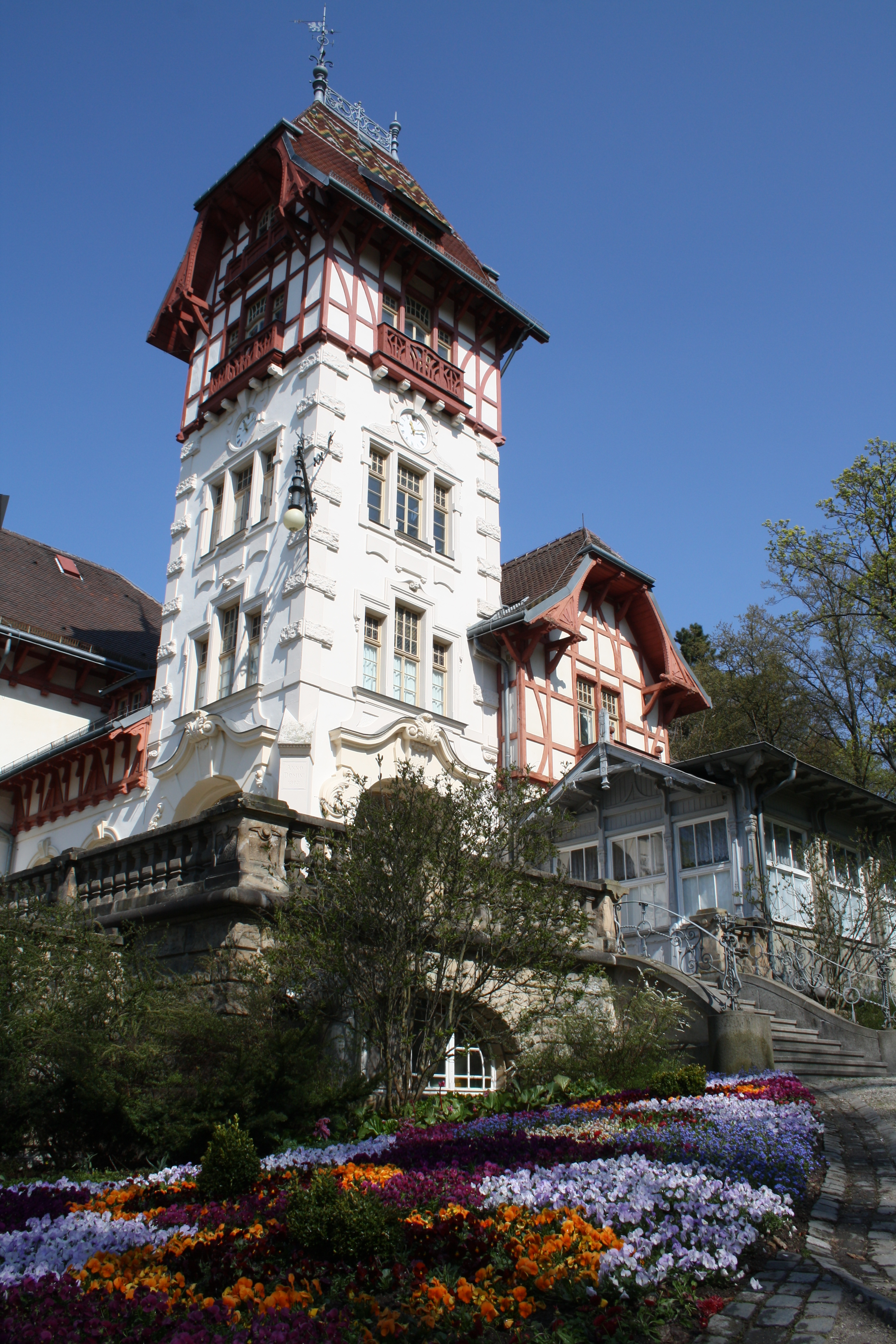
Theresienstein (parc)

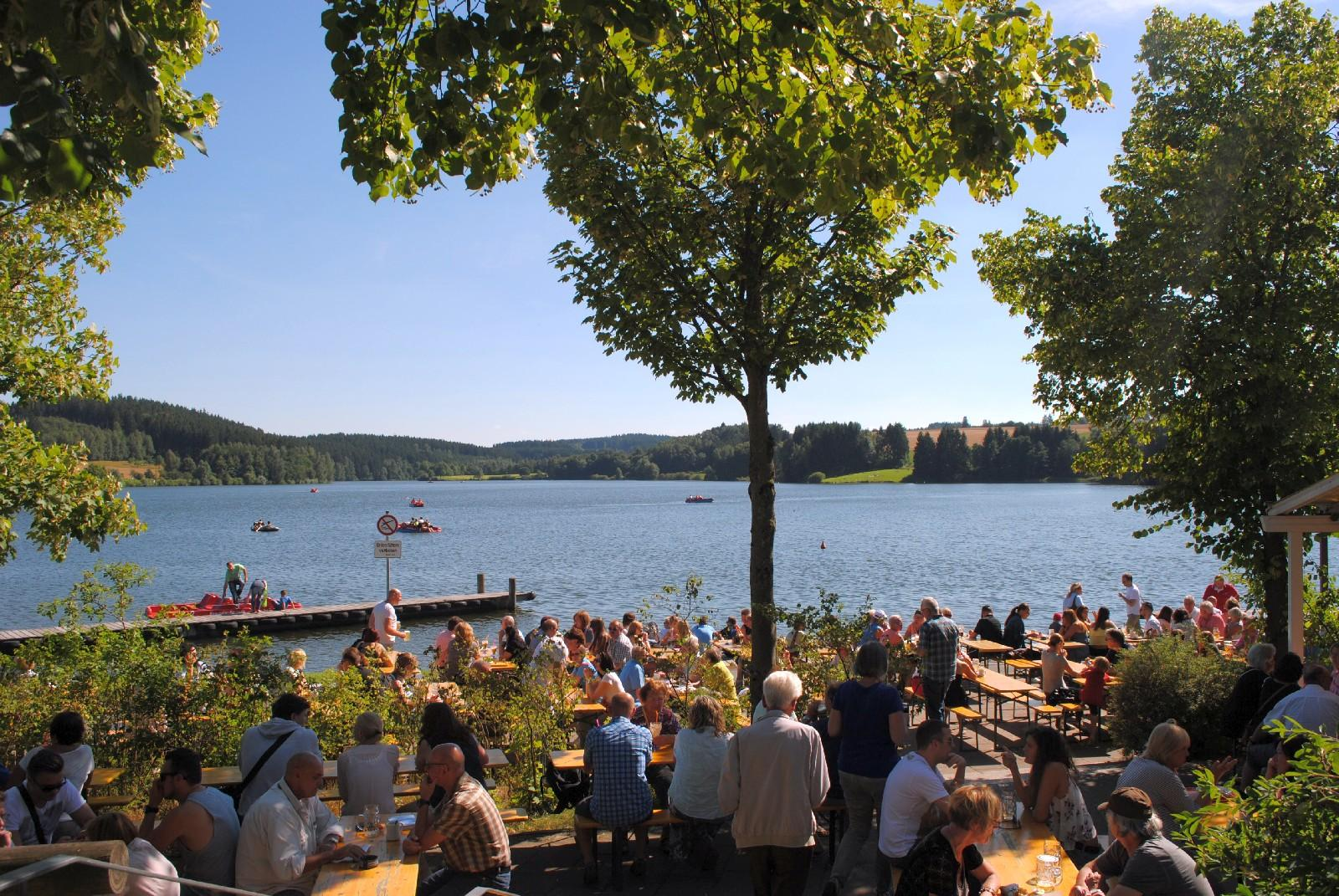
Untreusee in summer

=== Concert, theatre and festivals ===
- Freiheitshalle, the biggest hall for events and concerts in north-east Bavaria, famous for TV shows and trade fairs, with a capacity of more than 6,000 people.
- Theater Hof, a multi-purpose theatre, opera house and drama theatre. It hosts also the city's ballet company and a youth theatre. Intendant: Reinhardt Friese.
- Hofer Symphoniker, the symphony orchestra of Hof, plays as opera orchestra at the theatre and gives concerts at the Freiheitshalle Hof. Notable is also the Hofer Symphoniker Music School, which is unique among Germany's professional orchestras. Intendant: Ingrid Schrader.
- Church music at City churches St Mary's and St Michel's. Music direktors: Ludger Stühlmeyer and Georg Stanek.
- International Violin Competition Henri Marteau: Named after the violinist and violin teacher Henri Marteau, the competition takes place under the responsibility of the District of Upper Franconia and organized by Hofer Symphoniker every three years in Lichtenberg and Hof.
- Hof International Film Festival.
- Schlappentag (see above in the general description)
- Hofer Volksfest: The term Volksfest means fair or folk festival. The Hofer Volksfest is the biggest of its type in the area. It takes place at the end of July and beginning of August every year. It begins on the last Friday of July with a big parade which passes through the town centre in the direction of the festival area where it finishes. The festival occupies a big amusement park with a wide variety of attractions and all kinds of local food and beer specialties, and partly occupies a big beer tent area. Most of the latter takes place in a big concert hall but the atmosphere is similar to that of a beer tent. Every night, different local bands play mostly traditional Bavarian music.

== Weather and geography ==
Hof is also known as Bavarian Siberia because temperatures are usually a few degrees lower than in most other parts of Bavaria, particularly in winter, but summers are warm.

The coat-of-arms of Hof is a red shield with two white towers against which leans a black shield with a gold lion. 322 miles away the town of Heimbach where Hengebach castle is located (former capital of the Duchy of Jülich) the coat-of-arms is almost the reverse: a black shield with a red roof on a white tower against which leans a gold shield with a black lion. Although Hof is 322 miles away from Heimbach, the two cities have some association. The castle of Hengebach in Heimbach is located in the section that was the former village of Schmidt and there lived a branch of the baronial dynasty of von Schmidt auf Altenstadt until they emigrated in 1749 and the seat of the barons von Altenstadt was very near Hof, in a part of the municipality of Gattendorf known as Kirchgattendorf, where the ruins of the von Altenstadt castles can still be seen. But the coincidences do not stop there: the family arms of the von Schmidts auf Altenstadt were a swan and the arms of Gattendorf are a swan.

The barons von Schmidt auf Altenstadt, as barons of the village Gattendorf in the environs of Hof were a significant part of social and aristocratic life in the town. In the nineteenth century, Christoph August von Schmidt, after having served as a Provost at the University of Saint Petersburg, Russia where he was ennobled by the Tsar and awarded the orders of St Stanislaus and Sts Ann-and-Vladimir, erected a monument describing his adventure and bearing the simplified, swan version of his coat-of-arms which today has been adopted by the village of Gattendorf as its municipal arms.

Hof provided Anthony Hope (author of "The Prisoner of Zenda") with his inspiration for Strelsau, capital of his fictitious kingdom of Ruritania. Although the book locates Ruritania along the railway line between Dresden in Sachsen (Saxony) and Prague, capital of Bohemia (modern day Czech Republic), one can see Hof in the descriptions of Strelsau. Among the clues there is the name "Altstadt" for the "old town", similar to Altenstadt, the older part of Strelsau where "Black Michael", the Duke of Strelsau, was popular.

=== Climate ===
Climate in this area has mild differences between highs and lows, and there is adequate rainfall year-round. The Köppen Climate Classification subtype for this climate is "Cfb" (Marine West Coast Climate/Oceanic climate).

Climate data for Hof an der Saale, 567 m asl (1991–2020 normals)
Month	Jan	Feb	Mar	Apr	May	Jun	Jul	Aug	Sep	Oct	Nov	Dec	Year
Record high °C (°F)	13.3 (55.9)	15.9 (60.6)	21.3 (70.3)	28.2 (82.8)	29.9 (85.8)	32.5 (90.5)	34.9 (94.8)	35.2 (95.4)	31.0 (87.8)	25.1 (77.2)	16.8 (62.2)	13.6 (56.5)	35.2 (95.4)
Mean daily maximum °C (°F)	1.0 (33.8)	2.4 (36.3)	6.9 (44.4)	12.6 (54.7)	16.9 (62.4)	20.2 (68.4)	22.4 (72.3)	22.3 (72.1)	17.3 (63.1)	11.6 (52.9)	5.5 (41.9)	1.8 (35.2)	11.8 (53.2)
Daily mean °C (°F)	−1.3 (29.7)	−0.6 (30.9)	2.8 (37.0)	7.6 (45.7)	11.9 (53.4)	15.2 (59.4)	17.2 (63.0)	16.9 (62.4)	12.4 (54.3)	7.8 (46.0)	2.9 (37.2)	−0.3 (31.5)	7.7 (45.9)
Mean daily minimum °C (°F)	−3.8 (25.2)	−3.6 (25.5)	−0.8 (30.6)	2.6 (36.7)	6.7 (44.1)	10.0 (50.0)	12.0 (53.6)	11.7 (53.1)	8.0 (46.4)	4.4 (39.9)	0.6 (33.1)	−2.5 (27.5)	3.8 (38.8)
Record low °C (°F)	−24.7 (−12.5)	−27.0 (−16.6)	−24.1 (−11.4)	−11.6 (11.1)	−5.1 (22.8)	−1.6 (29.1)	1.2 (34.2)	1.0 (33.8)	−4.0 (24.8)	−10.5 (13.1)	−15.0 (5.0)	−25.4 (−13.7)	−27.0 (−16.6)
Average precipitation mm (inches)	55.3 (2.18)	46.0 (1.81)	49.3 (1.94)	38.5 (1.52)	58.8 (2.31)	69.5 (2.74)	86.6 (3.41)	75.3 (2.96)	61.4 (2.42)	55.5 (2.19)	54.7 (2.15)	61.7 (2.43)	712.6 (28.06)
Average precipitation days (≥ 1.0 mm)	18.5	16.0	17.1	13.6	14.7	15.0	16.1	13.9	13.4	15.6	16.4	19.5	189.9
Average snowy days (≥ 1.0 cm)	19.1	17.4	8.7	1.2	0	0	0	0	0	0.5	5.0	13.3	65.2
Average relative humidity (%)	89.8	85.6	80.9	73.0	72.2	72.6	71.9	72.3	80.1	86.7	91.6	91.7	80.7
Mean monthly sunshine hours	46.8	75.1	120.3	178.8	206.1	207.9	221.9	212.6	157.7	105.5	48.9	38.1	1,619.7
Source 1: World Meteorological Organization
Source 2: Météo Climat

== Education ==
Hof is also home to the University of Applied Sciences Hof which has around 3,700 students and the University of Applied Sciences for Administration and Legal Affairs in Bavaria which has around 1,800 students.

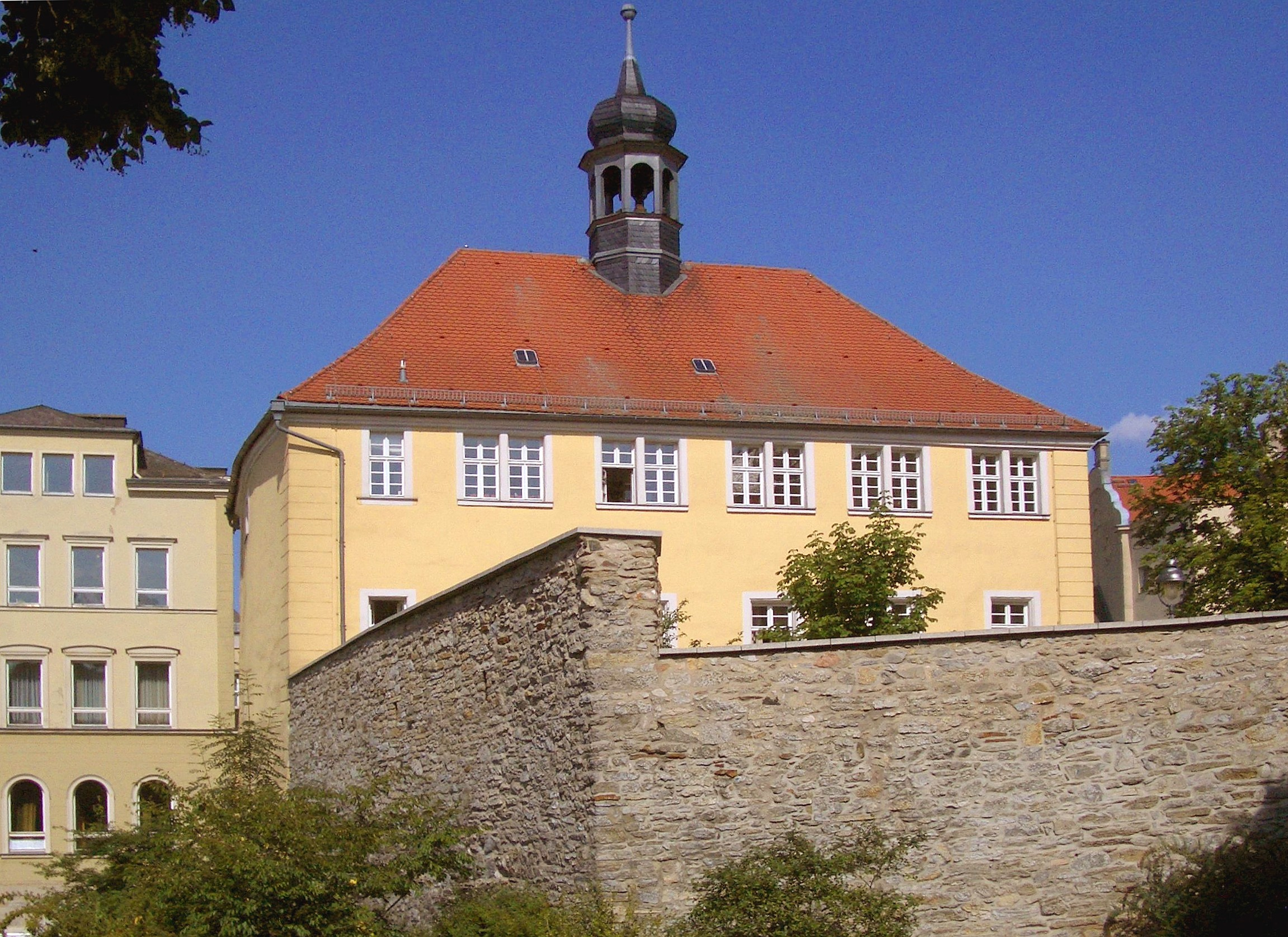
Jean Paul Gymnasium

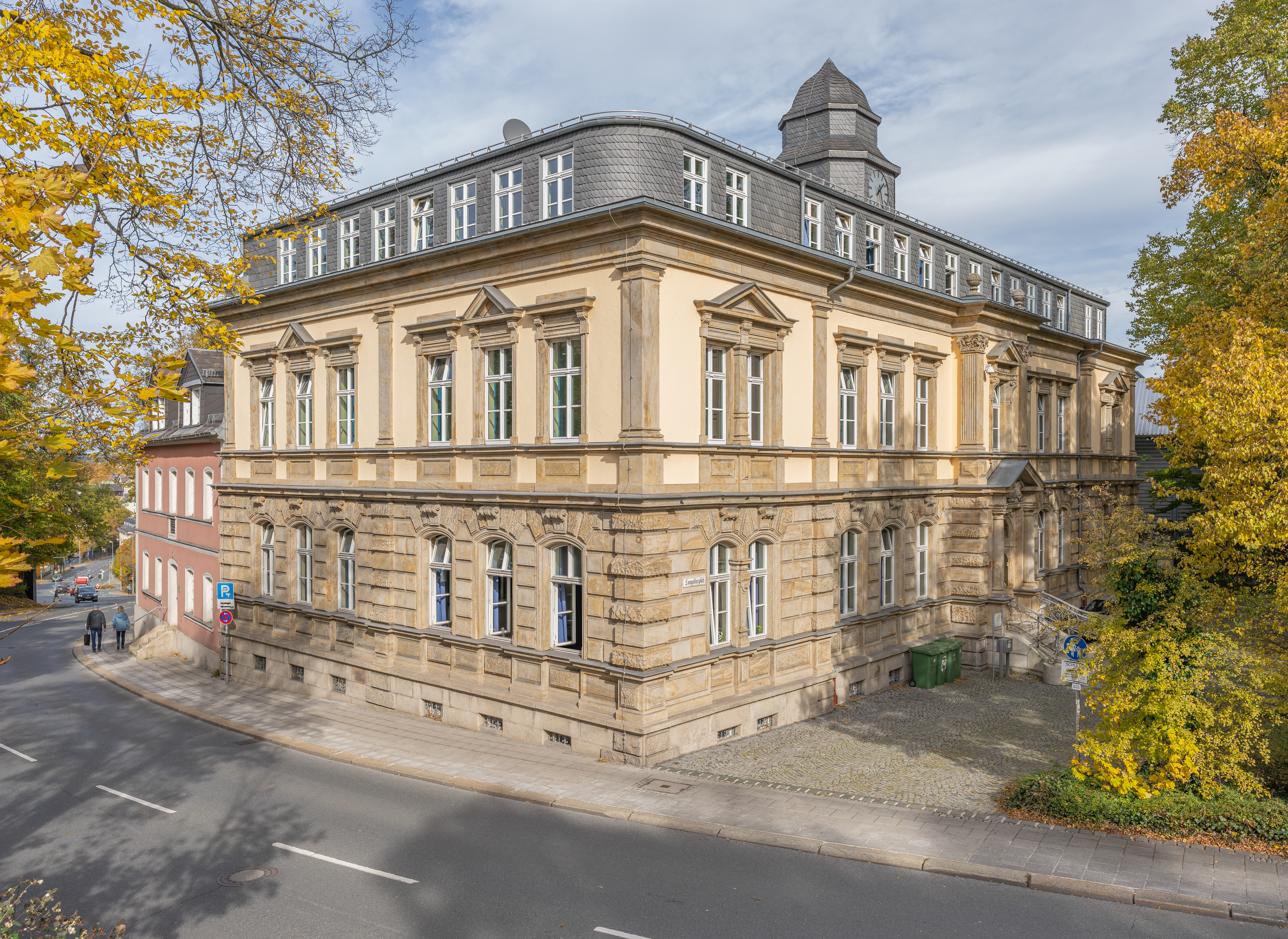
School at Longoliusplace

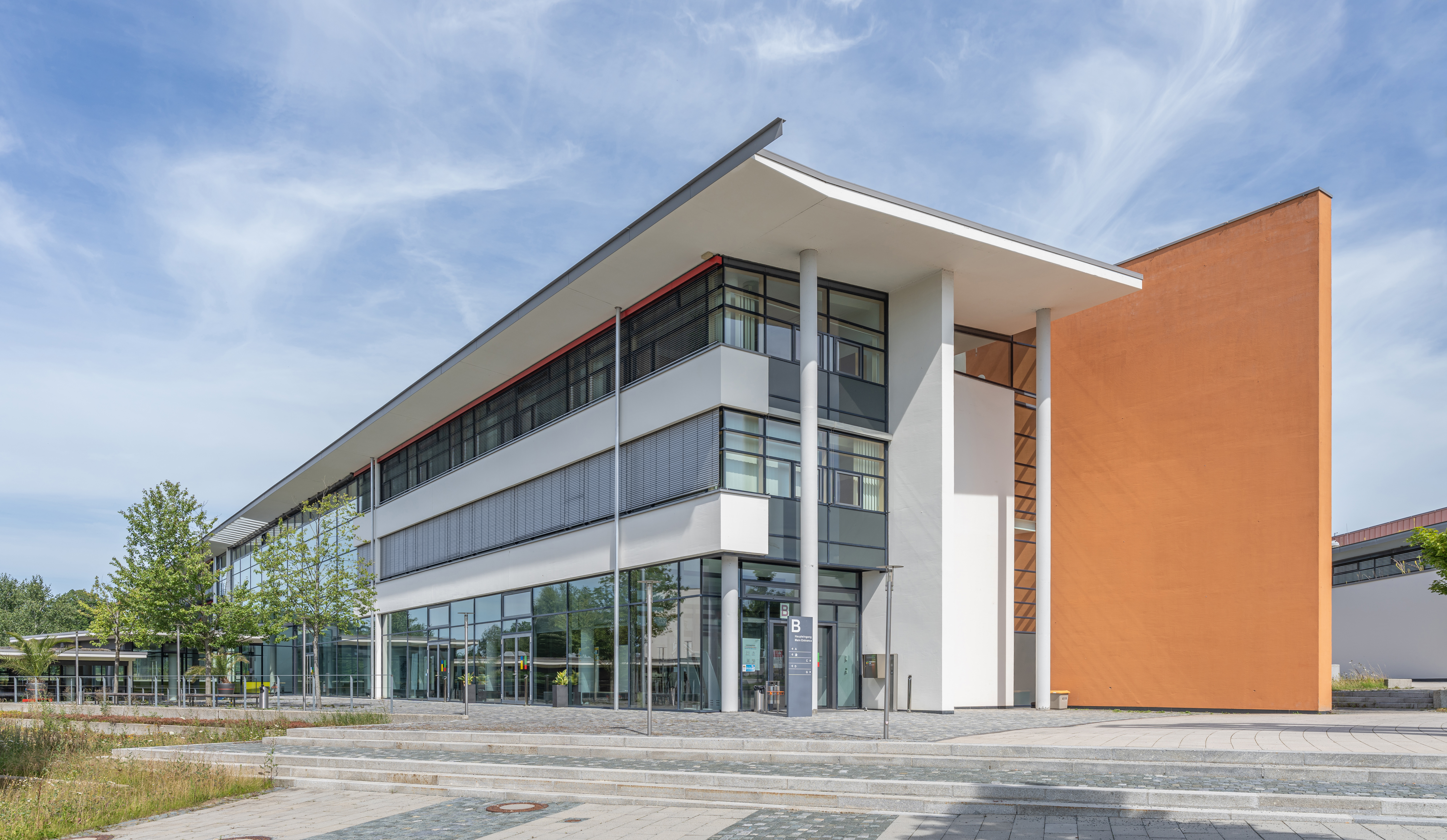
University

== Media ==
In Hof is the headquarters of the Frankenpost, the regional newspaper.

There are two radio stations Radio Euroherz and Extra Radio.

TV Oberfranken

Furthermore are the studios of the regional television channel TV Oberfranken (TV Upper-Franconia) in Hof.

== Military ==
Hof was of special interest during the Cold War as it was near the border with Czechoslovakia and the GDR. On Hohe Saas, there was a radar site. A border camp of the American 2nd Armored Cavalry Regiment was near the town. The 511th Military Intelligence Battalion also maintained a border resident office in Hof. Between 1949 and 1993, Hof was also the site of an RIAS transmitting station.

== Transport ==
Hof central station is on the Regensburg–Hof, Bamberg–Hof and Leipzig–Hof main lines and the Hof–Bad Steben branch line.

Buses are run by HofBus, which operates 12 routes in the town.

Hof has a regional airport. However, there are no schedule flights to and from the airport. The nearest airports are Nuremberg Airport, located 137 km (85 mi) south west, Erfurt Weimar Airport, located 157 km (98 mi) north west, Dresden Airport, located 182 km (113 mi) north east and Václav Havel Airport Prague, located 217 km (135 mi) east of Hof.

== Notable people ==
=== Born in Hof ===
- Nikolaus Decius (1485–after 1546), monk, minister, cantor, hymns poet and Prussian reformer
- Johann Christian Reinhart (1761–1847), painter, etcher and draftsman
- Johann Georg August Wirth (1798–1848), journalist and political activist
- Johann Erhard Fischer (1817–1884), pastor, historian, author and editor of Freimund's kirchlich-politisches Wochenblatt für Stadt und Land
- Heinrich Gerber (1832–1912), civil engineer, bridge-builder and inventor of the Gerber girder
- Otto von Schrön (1837–1917), physician, epidemiologist, Director of the Institute of Pathological Anatomy at the University of Naples, freeman of Naples

Otto von Lossow, major

- Otto von Lossow (1868–1938), General, commander of the Infantry School in Munich
- Ernst Pöhner (1870–1925), Munich Police President and one of the parties at the Hitler Ludendorff Putsch in 1923
- Hans Georg Hofmann (1873–1942), SA-Obergruppenführer and Regierungspräsident of Middle and Upper Bavaria
- Stefan Dittrich (1912–1988), politician (CSU), member of the Bundestag
- Gerhard Hetz (1942–2012), float and swim coach
- Klaus Wedemeier (born 1944), SPD - politician, 1971–1985 and 1995–1999 member of the Bremen Regional Parliament (Landtag), 1985–1995 mayor and president of the Senate of Bremen
- Reinhard Kapp (born 1947), musicologist
- Daniel Felgenhauer (born 1976), football player
- Vivi Vassileva (born 1994), percussionist
- Mergim Vojvoda (born 1995), Kosovan football player

=== Those associated with Hof ===
- Stephan Agricola (1491–1547), theologian and reformer in Hof
- Paul Daniel Longolius (1704–1779), rector of the school in Hof, chief editor of Zedler Universal Lexicon
- Jean Paul (1763–1825), writer, visited the school in Hof
- Bernhard Lichtenberg (1875–1943), Catholic priest who took a position critical during the Nazi era, died on the way to Dachau concentration camp in court. Was awarded for his commitment to persecuted Jews in the Israeli memorial Yad Vashem as "Righteous Among the Nations" (memorial bust in the Parish Church of St. Mary)
- Leo Götz (1883–1962), painter, died in Hof
- Richard Wendler (1898–1972) mayor in Hof
- Hans Hofner (1908–1982), local historian, winner of the Golden Ring of Honour of the city Hof
- Enoch zu Guttenberg (1946–2018), honorary conductor of the Hofer Symphoniker
- Hans-Peter Friedrich (born 1957), German politician of the CSU, former Interior Minister
- Ludger Stühlmeyer (born 1961), deanerycantor, docent, musicologist and composer
- Barbara Stühlmeyer (born 1964), author, scientist, church musician
- Alfredo Stroessner (1912–2006) 42nd president of Paraguay's father, Hugo Strößner was from Hof

== Literature ==
- Chronik der Stadt Hof, Band I-X, Veröffentlichung der Stadt Hof, Mintzel Druck Hof (Chronicle of the City Court, Volume I-X, publication of Hof, Mintzel pressure Hof 1937-1997):

Band I, Hof 1937, Ernst Dietlein: Allgemeine Stadtgeschichte bis zum Jahre 1603.
Band II, Hof 1939, Ernst Dietlein: Allgemeine Stadtgeschichte von 1603-1763.
Band III, Hof 1942, Ernst Dietlein: Allgemeine Stadtgeschichte von 1763-1871.
Band IV, Hof 1955, Ernst Dietlein: Kirchengeschichte.
Band V, Hof 1957, Friedrich Ebert: Baugeschichte.
Band VI, Hof 1966, Friedrich Ebert, Karl Waelzel: Alte Hofer Stadtbeschreibungen.
Band VII/1, Hof 1979, Dietmar Trautmann: Wirtschaftsgeschichte bis 1810.
Band VIII, Hof 1936, Ernst Dietlein: Hof – Geburtsstadt großer Männer.
Band IX, Hof 1997, Rudolf Müller, Carola Friedmann, Adelheid Weißer: Rechts- und Verwaltungsgeschichte der Stadt Hof.
Band X, Hof 2005, Jörg Wurdack: Militärgeschichte der Stadt Hof.

- Christoph Rabenstein: Politische und publizistische Strömungen in einer Stadt Oberfrankens. Hof 1918-1924. Hagens Antiquariatsbuchhandlung, Bayreuth 1986.
- Friedrich Ebert, Axel Herrmann: Kleine Geschichte der Stadt Hof. Hoermann Verlag, Hof 1988, ISBN 3-88267-034-7.
- Peter Nürmberger, Reinhard Feldrapp: Hof in Bayern ganz oben. Hoermann Verlag, Hof 2002, ISBN 3-88267-062-2.
- Arnd Kluge, Beatrix Münzer-Glas: Stadt und Landkreis Hof. Sutton Verlag, Erfurt 2007, ISBN 978-3-86680-192-9.
- Ludger Stühlmeyer: Curia sonans. Die Musikgeschichte der Stadt Hof. Eine Studie zur Kultur Oberfrankens. Von der Gründung des Bistums Bamberg bis zur Gegenwart. (Curia sonans - The musical history of the city court. With biographies of musicians who were born in the yard or have worked here.) Phil.Diss., Bayerische Verlagsanstalt, Heinrichs-Verlag, Bamberg 2010, ISBN 978-3-89889-155-4.
