= Theater Hof =

German theater

Coordinates: 50.319586°N 11.904941°E

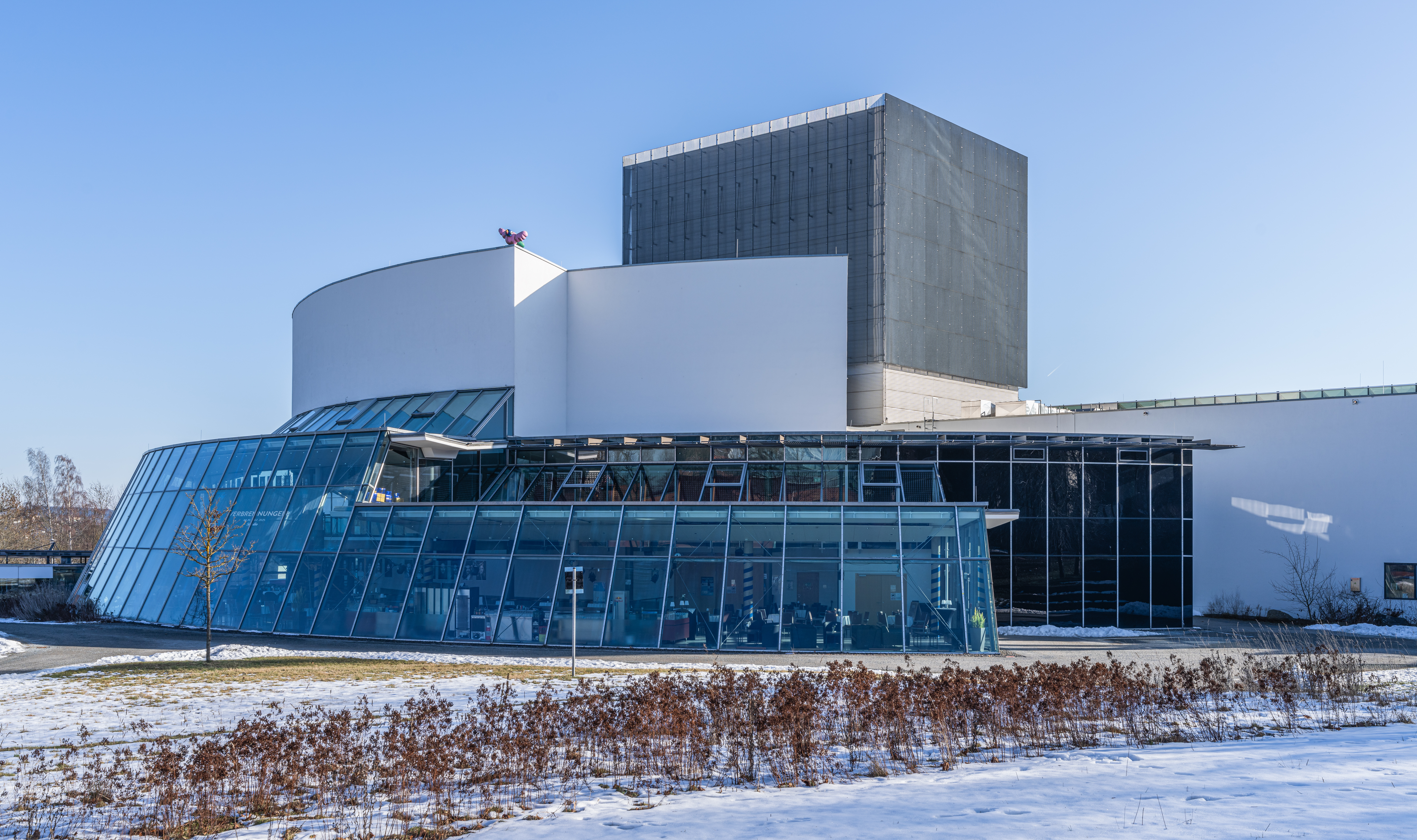
A photo of Theater Hof in 2026

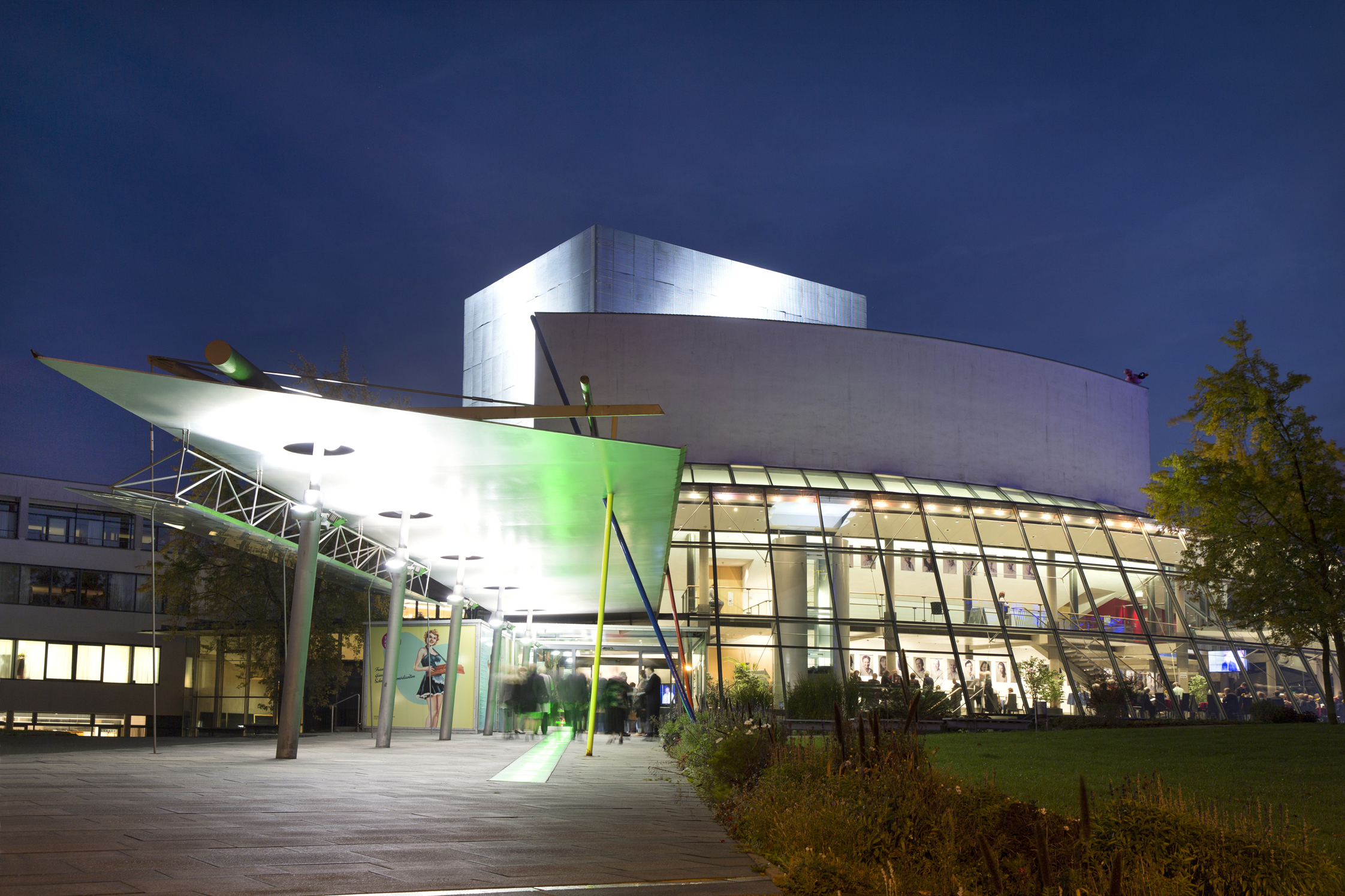
The theater in 2017

Theater Hof is a theater in the German city of Hof, Bavaria.
