= Siege of Hof =

Siege during the Second Margrave War

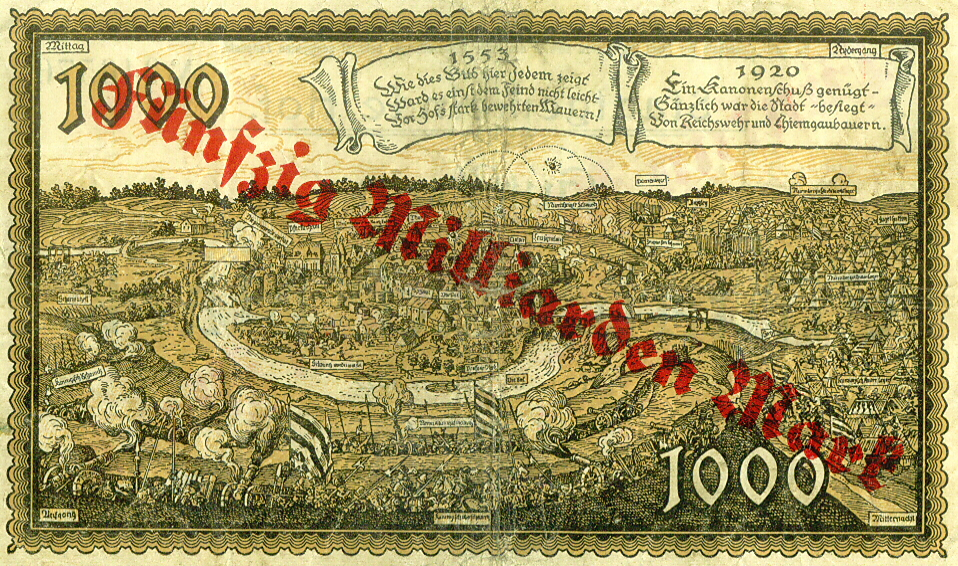
Emergency money printed by the city in 1920 with the woodcut by Hans Glaser

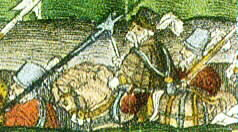
Tinted element of the woodcut with a depiction of Henry IV of Plauen

The siege of Hof was an event of the Second Margrave War. The city of Hof was successfully besieged in 1553 by the opponents of the Margrave Albert II Alcibiades of Brandenburg-Kulmbach.

== Background ==
In the wake of the Second Margrave War and the Princes' uprising, Albert Alcibiades was feuding not only with his neighbors, including Würzburg, Bamberg, and Nuremberg, but also with distant prince-bishops and princes. After the questions of faith, which had played a crucial role in the Prince's rebellion, had been resolved in the negotiations which resulted in the Peace of Passau, Albert II Alcibiades continued his military operations unabated, thereby isolated himself from his former allies. He could not keep the advantages he had gained over his neighbors permanently. The war gradually moved into his own country, the margraviate of Brandenburg-Kulmbach (for example, the Siege of Kulmbach and the Plassenburg), and this eventually led to the Margrave's defeat. Despite losing the war, the House of Hohenzollern succeeded in keeping the war-torn Margraviate and Albert Alcibiades was succeeded as Margrave by his cousin George Frederick.

The siege of the city of Hof had been documented in extraordinary detail by the historian Jacob Schlemmer. The key events are summarized in a woodcut by the Nuremberg artist Hans Glaser. Among the leaders of the attackers were Henry IV of Plauen and Georg Wolf of Kotzau, who remained after the siege as the governor of Hof.

Hof Castle was part of the city's defensive system, along with the city wall.

The nuns of the Monastery Hof, led by Abbess Amalie of Hirschberg, had escaped to Cheb (German: Eger). The Church of St. Lorenz was looted and burned during the siege. The Watch Tower, although of little strategic importance, also burned out. The Hospital Church was used as a war camp by the attackers, and was therefore attacked and destroyed by the city's defenders.

== Exhibition ==
In the Bavarian Vogtland Museum in Hof, a scale model of the city at the time of the siege, is on display. Prominent buildings, streets, the fortifications and the city limits at the time, are reproduced very accurately. In coöperation with the German Figurine Museum at the Plassenburg in Kulmbach, a Diorama of the assailants has been put on display, and also some equipment of the soldiers. Stone cannonballs are embedded into the walls of several buildings within the walled city, including the St. Michael's Church.

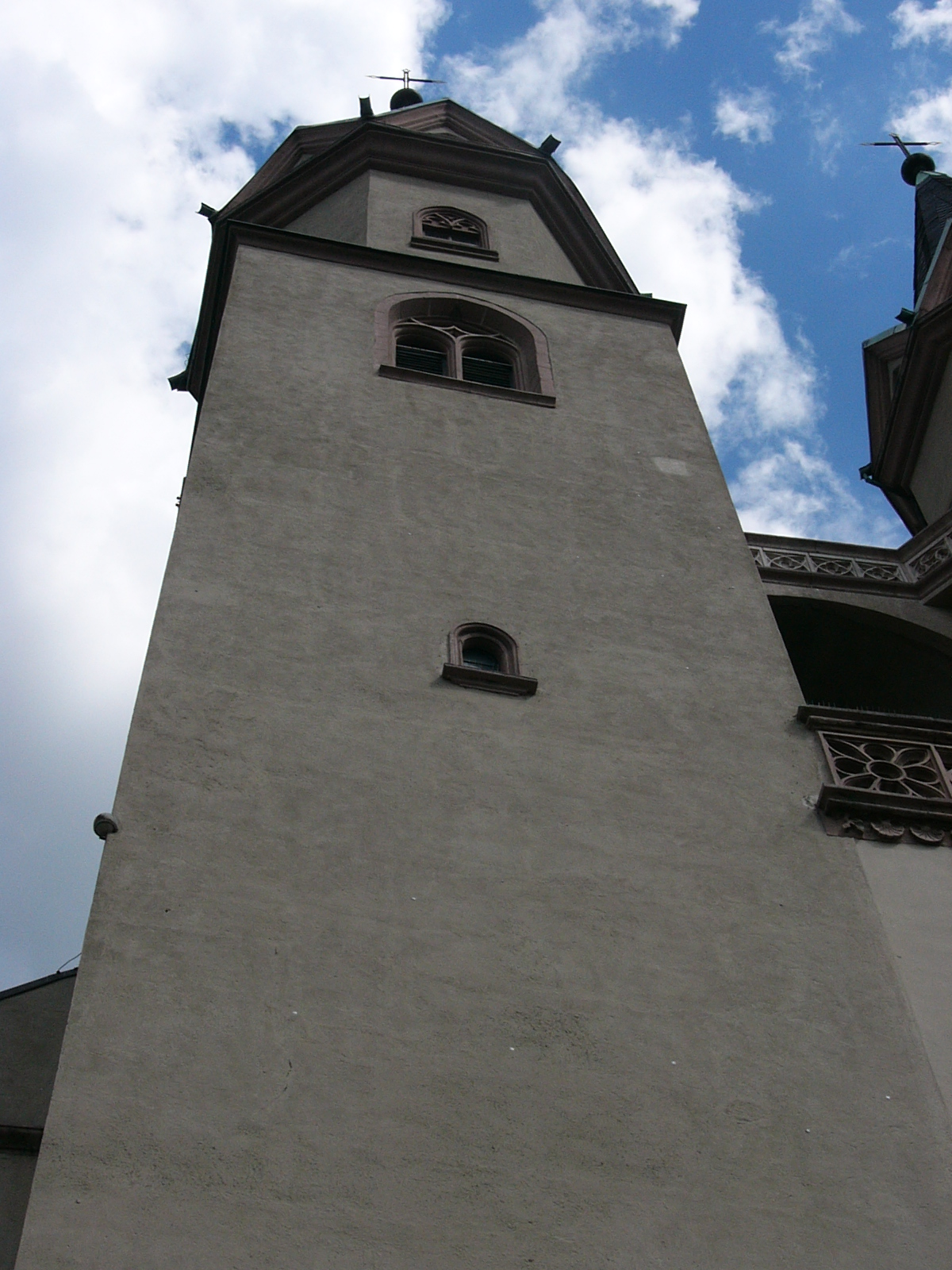
Cannonball as a part of the wall at the tower of St. Michael's (left)

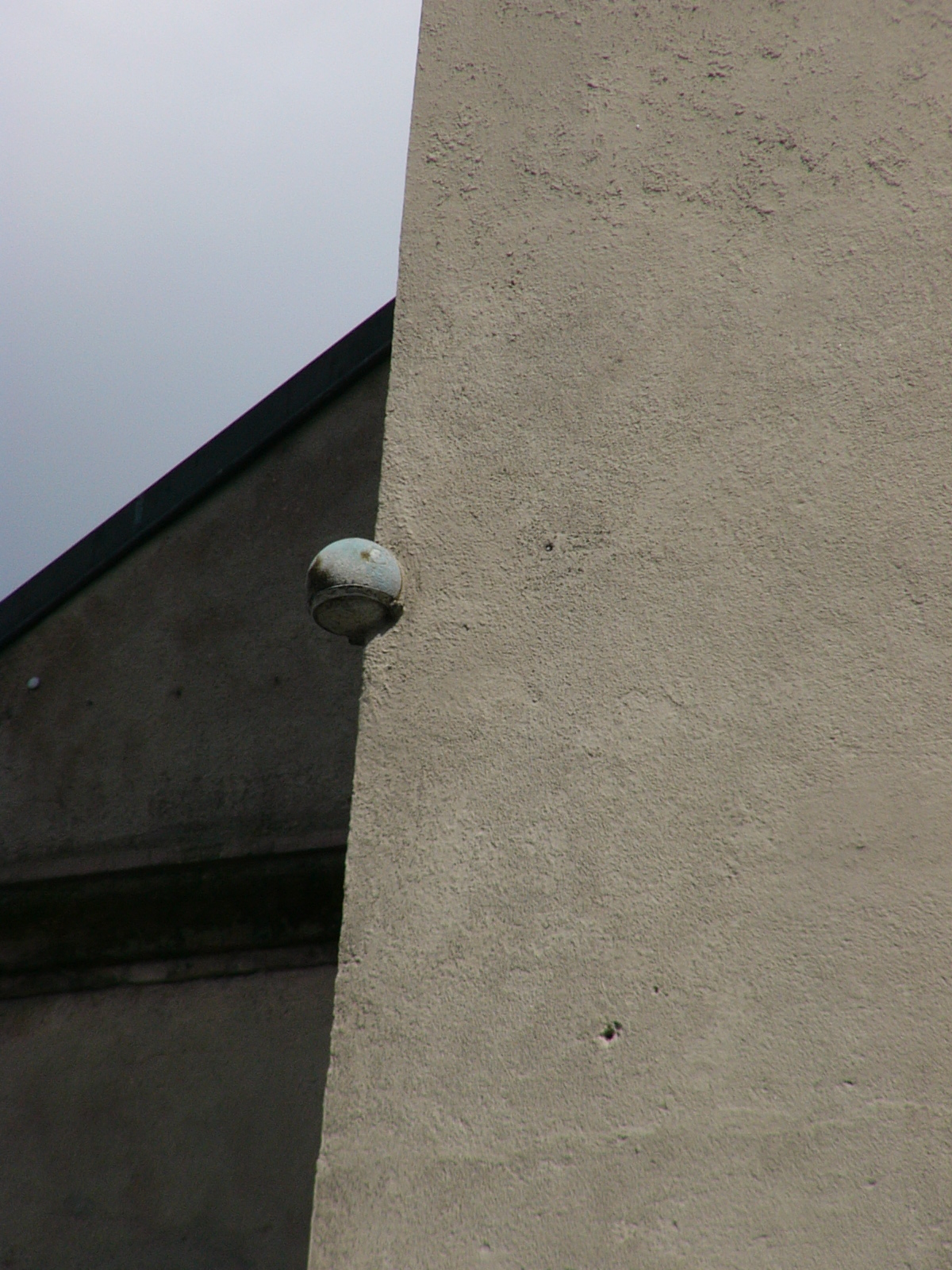
Magnification of this cannonball in the tower

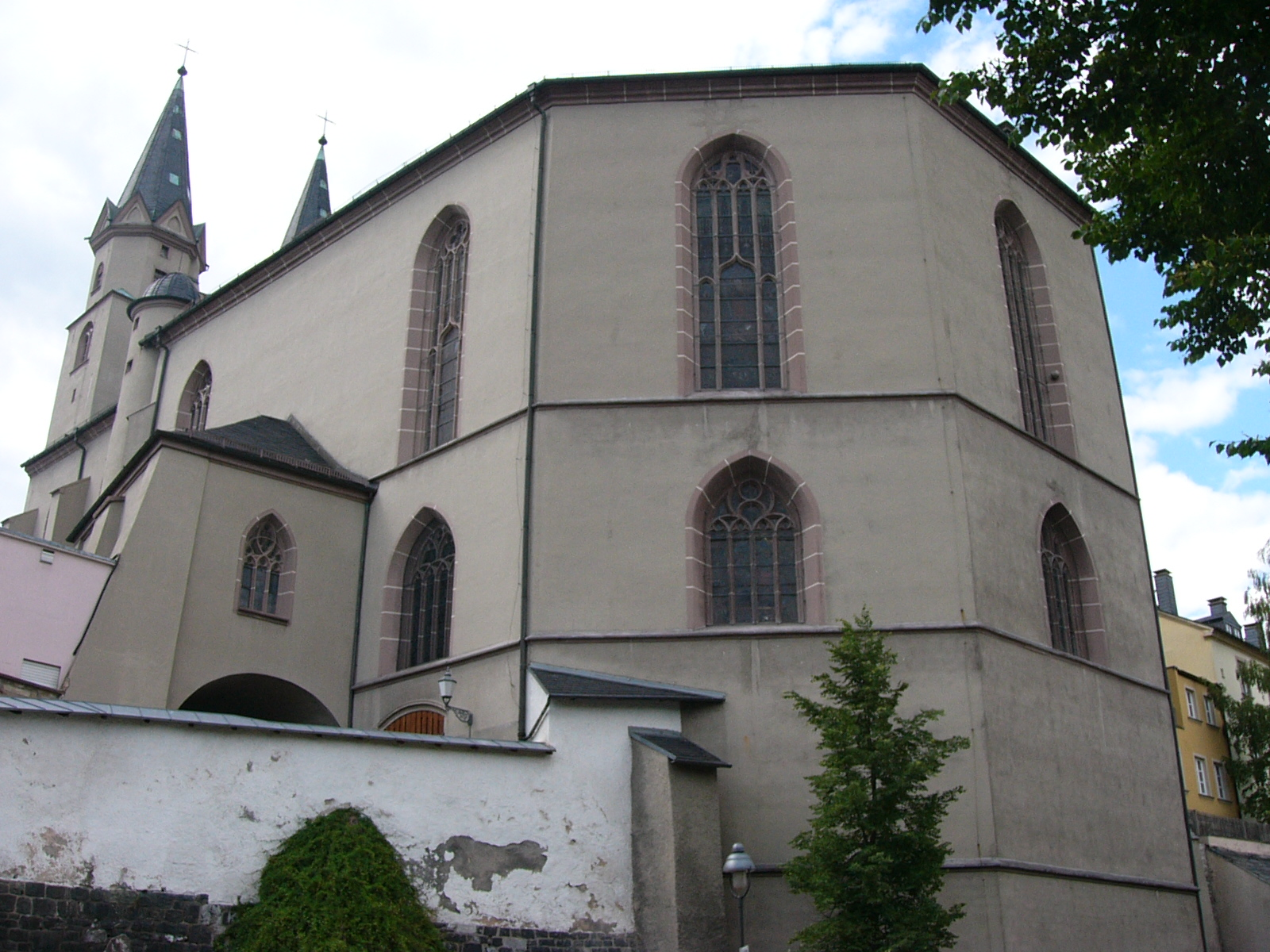
Rear of St. Michael's with a cannon ball in the top right of window arch

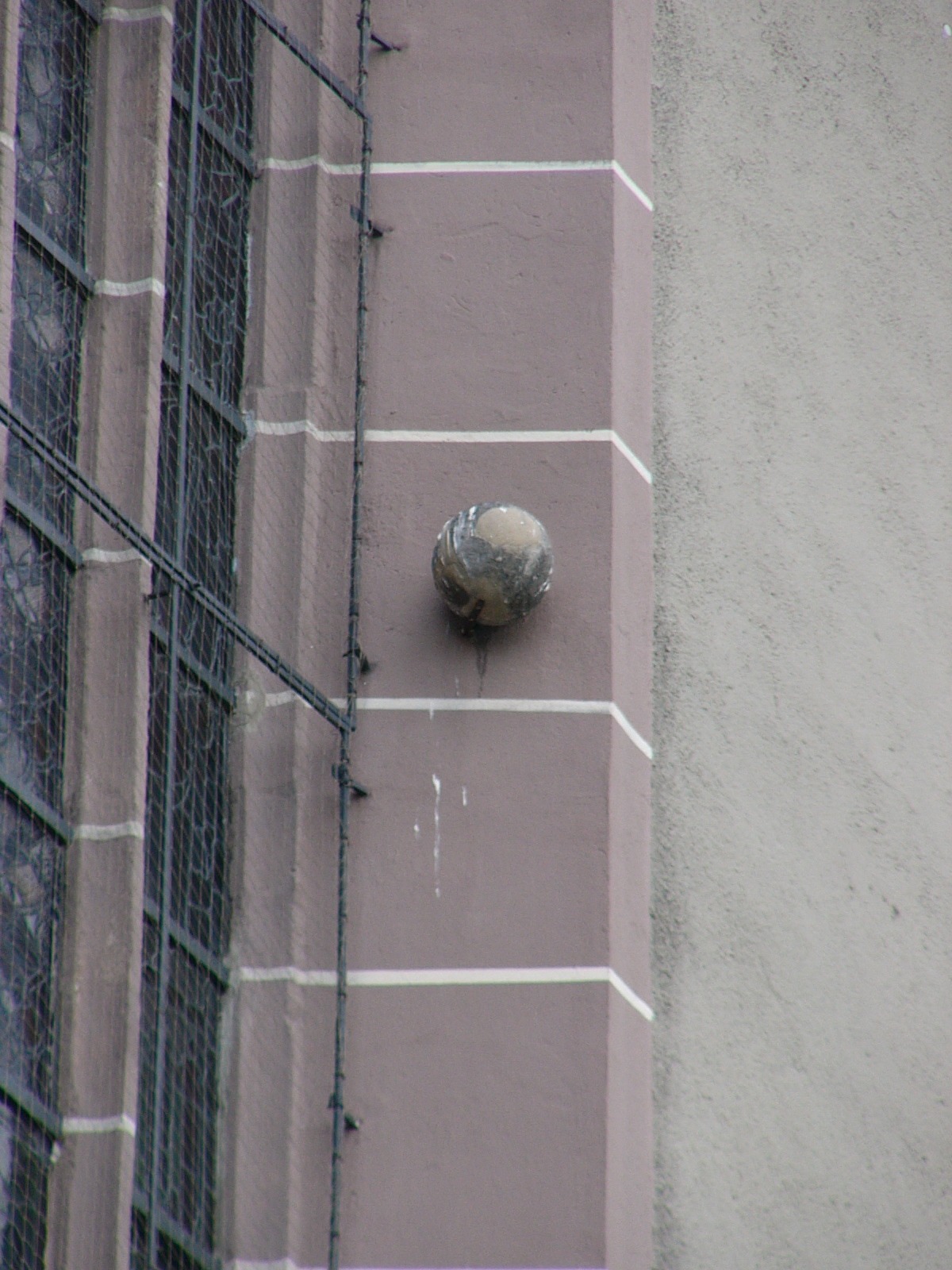
Magnification of the cannonball in the window frame

== References and sources ==
- Kurt Stierstorfer: Die Belagerung Hofs 1553, Hof, 2003, ISBN 3-928626-43-4.
- Kurt Stiersdorfer, Walter Wirth (eds.): Jacob Schlemmer - Historia des Markgrafenkrieges und der Belagerung Hofs, Hof, 2011, ISBN 978-3-928626-62-0.
