= Battle of Stralsund =

Battle of Stralsund may refer to any of the following battles and/or sieges:

- 1665 celestial phenomenon over Stralsund, also called the Air Battle of Stralsund
- Siege of Stralsund (1628), a battle in the Thirty Years' War
- Siege of Stralsund (1678), a siege in the Scanian War
- Siege of Stralsund (1711–1715), a siege in the Great Northern War
- Blockade of Stralsund, a 1757-58 armed investment of Stralsund by Prussian forces during the Seven Years' War
- Siege of Stralsund (1807), a battle during the Napoleonic Wars
- Battle of Stralsund (1809), a battle during the Napoleonic Wars
