= Leopold Schlick =

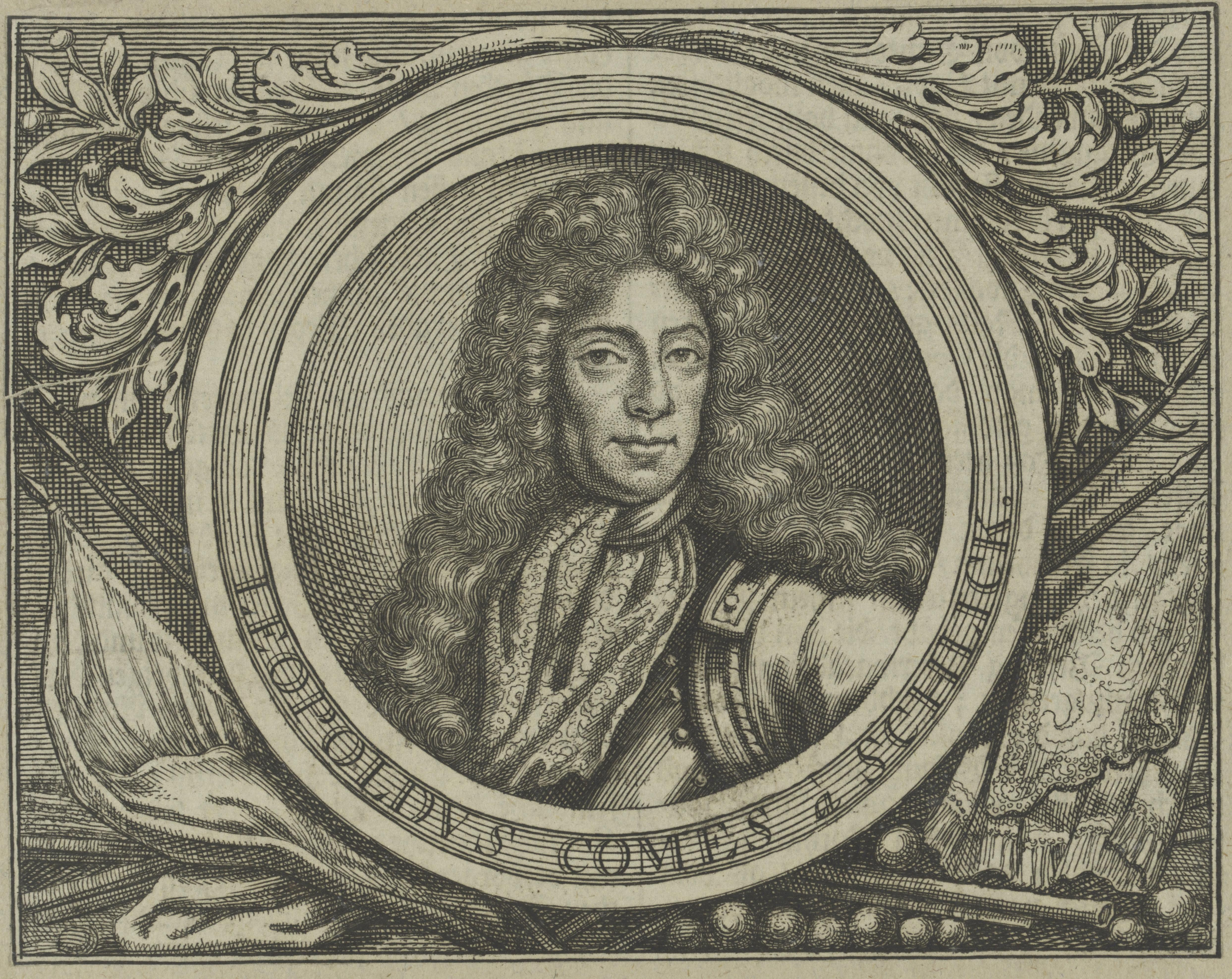
Portrait of Leopold Schlick

Leopold Schlick (German: Leopold Anton Joseph Count Schlik zu Bassano und Weißkirchen, Czech: Leopold Šlik z Holíče a Pasounu; 10 July 1663 – 10 April 1723), was a Czech nobleman. He was an Imperial diplomat, Field Marshal and High Chancellor of Bohemia.

== Biography ==
He was born on 10 July 1663 in Ostrov. After a careful education, he traveled and, upon his return, volunteered for the regiment of his stepfather, Count Taafe von Carlingsfort, and witnessed the Siege of Neuhäusel and the Siege of Esztergom (1685). The following year, he became a captain in the regiment of the Duke of Lorraine and was wounded in the main assault at the Siege of Buda (1686). He then rose to the rank of lieutenant colonel in the Saxe-Lauenburg Cuirassiers and, in 1689 at the age of only 26, was promoted to colonel of a dragoon regiment.

During this time, he witnessed all the battles that took place in Hungary and commanded the final blockade of the fortress of Großwardein. In 1692, the Emperor appointed him Sergeant General. He took part in the unsuccessful Siege of Belgrade (1693), commanded the rearguard during the withdrawal of the Imperial troops, and was wounded in the shoulder during a sortie by the Turks from the fortress. The Emperor then awarded him the command of the border between the Danube and Transylvania for life.

He was then employed on various diplomatic missions, particularly in the matter of the Spanish succession, and then, in 1697, in the negotiations of the Treaty of Karlowitz with the Ottomans. In 1701, he became Imperial Privy Councilor.

In 1703, he marched for his Imperial master against the Elector of Bavaria, invading the Bavarian lands via Salzburg, annihilating the local militia there, and occupying the towns of Ried, St. Martin, Aroldsmünster, and Zell in Lower Bavaria. Soon after, however, he suffered a defeat at the hands of the Elector at the Battle of Sigharting (Eisenbirn).

Promoted to General of Cavalry, he was given supreme command of the troops operating in Upper Hungary against Rakóczy and the Hungarian rebels. After invading Hungary via Dukla and joining forces with Palatine Paul Esterházy and several loyal magnates in the Bratislava and Nitra counties, he crossed the Nitra with his 30,000-strong army corps and, on 1 November 1703, attacked László Ocskay's rebel band near Levice, killing 500, capturing 600, and putting the rest to flight. Through this victory, he liberated Leva, Karpfen, the Hungarian mining towns of Kremnica and Schemnitz, Alt- and Neusohl from the rebels.

In 1707, the count was deployed to organize the newly acquired Duchy of Milan.

Appointed General War Commissioner in 1708, he went to the Netherlands with Prince Eugene of Savoy and witnessed the capture of Lille. He then became Imperial Privy Councillor, Field Marshal General in 1712, and, after the death of his brother-in-law, Count Johann Wenzel Wratislaw von Mitrowitz, Supreme Chancellor of the Kingdom of Bohemia in 1713.

As such, he completed the construction of the palace of the Bohemian Court Chancellery in Vienna, begun by his predecessor, in 1714. He was awarded the Order of the Golden Fleece in 1721.

The count died on 10 April 1723 in Prague, at the age of 60, and his body was brought to Prague and buried in the Metropolitan Church near St. Vitus Cathedral.

=== Marriage and children ===
The count was married twice:

- In 1687 to Clara Rosalie von Kaunitz (died 1693), widow of Jaroslav Bernard Bořita of Martinic:
  - Josefa Marie Anna (1690–1728), married Carl Joseph Raduit de Souches (Schlick)
- In 1711 to Maria Josepha Countess Wratislaw von Mitrowitz, a sister of Johann Wenzel Wratislaw von Mitrowitz:
  - Franz Heinrich Joseph (1696–1766), his heir. Married Eleonore Lucia Gräfin von und zu Trauttmansdorff-Weinsberg. Had issue.
  - Maria Josepha Philippine (1708–1761), married Miklós Pálffy de Erdőd, son of János Pálffy.
