= Battle of Nuremberg =

Battle of Nuremberg may refer to:

- Siege of Nuremberg, a battle fought during the Thirty Years' War between the Swedish Empire and the Holy Roman Empire in 1632
- Battle of Nuremberg (1945), a battle fought between the United States and Nazi Germany in World War II
- Battle of Nuremberg (2006 FIFA World Cup), the nickname of a 2006 World Cup game played between Portugal and the Netherlands, which saw 16 yellow cards being dished out and four players (two on each side) dismissed after picking up their second bookings.
- 1561 celestial phenomenon over Nuremberg, a mass sighting of unidentified flying objects, interpreted by some modern UFO enthusiasts as an aerial battle
