= Kotzau =

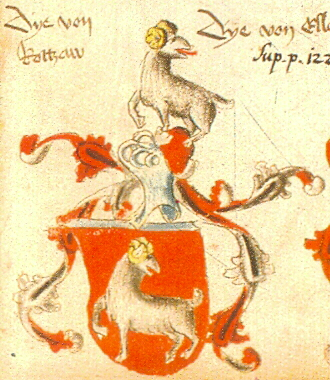
Coat of arms in Ingeram-Codex

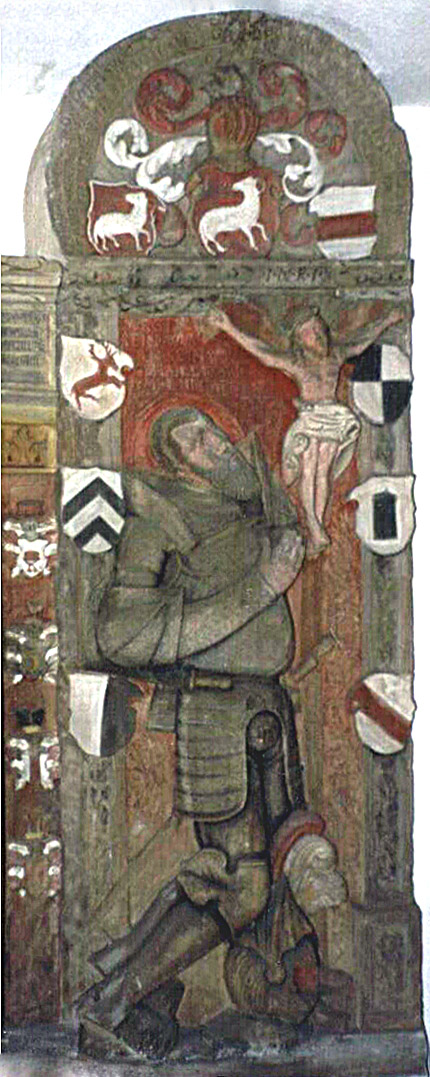
Georg Wolf von Kotzau

The House of Kotzau (German pronunciation: [ˈkɔtsaʊ]) was an old minor German noble family in Franconia, Germany.

== History ==
The House of Kotzau took its name from the village of Kotzau, today called Oberkotzau and it is located in the district Hof in Upper Franconia. Famous members of the family were abbess in the abbeys of Himmelkron and Hof. Hans von Kotzau fought against the hussites at Wunsiedel in 1430. In Second Margrave War Georg Wolf of Kotzau, originally a knight in the fellowship of Albert Alcibiades, Margrave of Brandenburg-Kulmbach, turned against his prince and supported Henry IV, Burgrave of Plauen. 1553 the town of Hof was besieged, captured and Georg Wolf was appointed to be governor. The family was directly related with the Houses of Guttenberg, Sparneck and Zedtwitz. The last knight died in 1661 in a duel.

The House of Hohenzollern founded the dynasty of the Freiherren of Kotzau, though not related to the knightly family. It was Georg Albrecht, son of Georg Albrecht, Margrave of Brandenburg-Bayreuth-Kulmbach, who entered into a morganatic marriage. For his wife Regina Magdalena Lutz and his descendants the title was created and they received castle and land at Oberkotzau. The Freiherren died out in 1976.
