= Johann Wenzel Wratislaw von Mitrowitz =

Czech nobleman

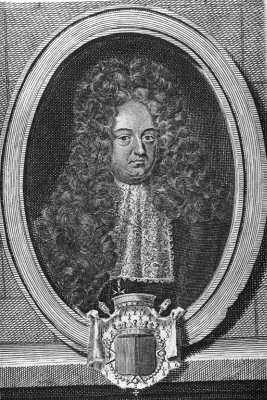
Johann Wenzel Wratislaw of Mitrovice

Count Johann Wenzel Wratislaw of Mitrovice (Czech: Jan Václav Vratislav z Mitrovic, German: Johann Wenzel Wratislaw von Mitrowitz; c. 1670 – 21 December 1712) was a Czech nobleman. He was the High Chancellor of Bohemia. He was the member of the Wratislaw of Mitrovice family.

== Biography ==
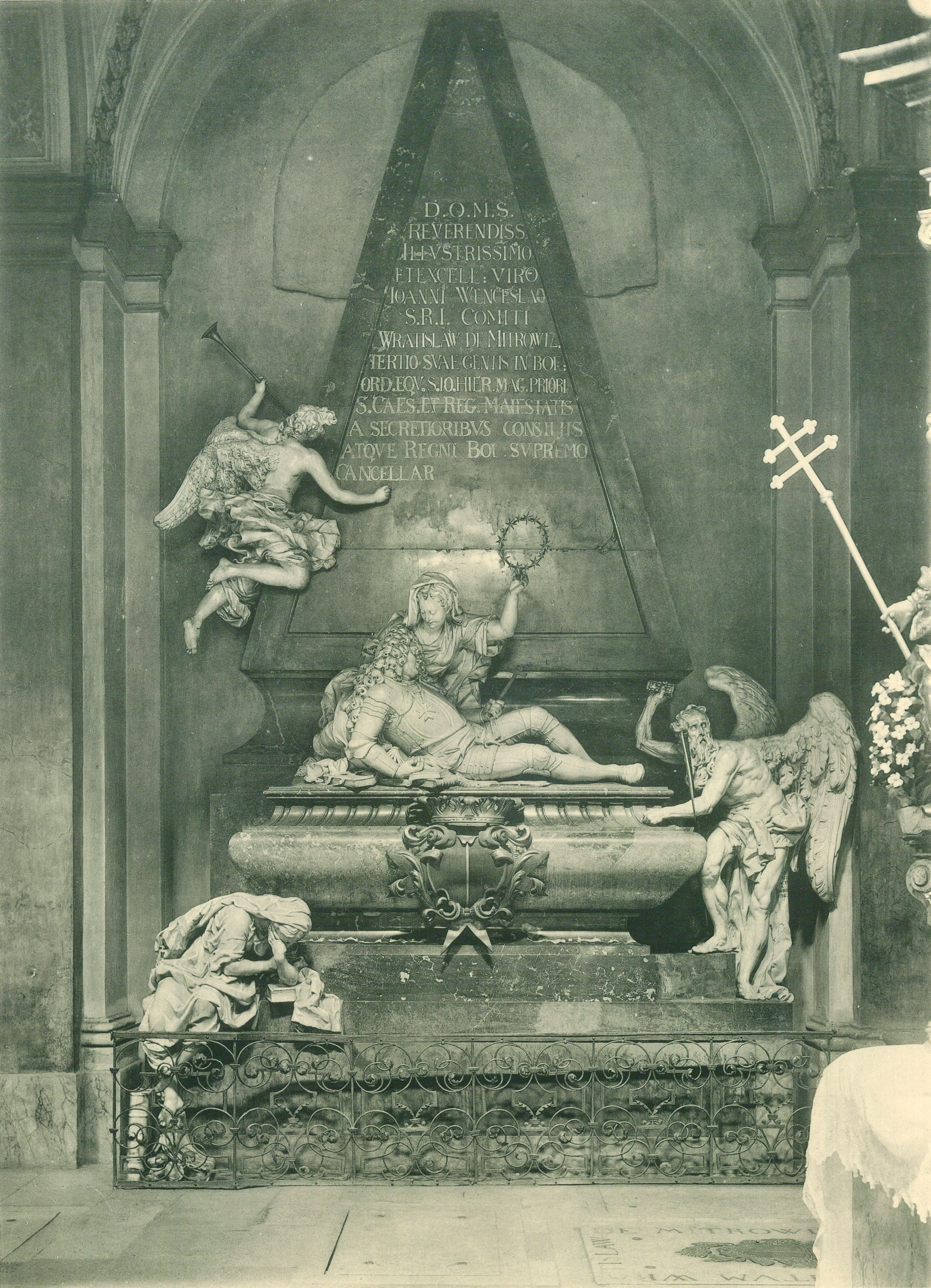
The count's tomb at the Church of St. James the Great

Count Johann Wenzel Wratislaw of Mitrovice was born into the noble Bohemian family of Wratislaw of Mitrovice. In his early years he was a lawyer and travelled through Europe. With the support of his uncle Count Franz Ulrich Kinsky he became a member of the chancery of the Austrian court in 1695. At the beginning of the 18th century, he worked as a diplomat in London and The Hague, where he participated in the formation of the alliance against France, and on 7 September 1701 was one of the signatories of the Treaty of The Hague, after establishing himself during the preceding negotiations as a realist, who saw that it was impractical for Austria to take over the whole legacy of Spain. At this time he became the friend of Prince Eugene of Savoy, to whom he gave advice in foreign affairs. Before the Battle of Blenheim he supported Eugene by sending Marlborough to join him in South Germany and thereafter helping to coordinate their activities. After the fall of Bavaria however it was not Wratislaw who was appointed governor, although that was what Eugene proposed, but Count Löwenstein, a court favourite in Vienna.

When Emperor Leopold I died in 1705, Wratislaw was appointed Chancellor of Bohemia and Joseph I's adviser in foreign affairs. His life was made more difficult however by Joseph's tutor, Karl Theodor von Salm, who saw him as a rival and took pains to put obstacles in his path. Subsequently Wratislaw advised Eugene against accepting the high command on the Spanish front, on the basis that although it was possible to rule Austria and Italy jointly, it was impossible to rule Austria and Spain jointly, and that therefore any military action there, even if successful, made little sense.

After Joseph's death on 17 April 1711, Wratislaw, as a minister, became a member of the council advising his widow as Regent, Eleonore-Magdalena, which brought about the withdrawal of Joseph's brother Karl from Catalonia. When Karl was crowned as Emperor Charles VI he confirmed Wratislaw in his offices, who remained from then on in Vienna, where, badly overweight, he was believed to have died on 21 December 1712 of dropsy. His remains were interred for a year in Vienna's Totenkapelle before being moved to the Church of St. James the Great in Staré Město, Prague in 1714, following the completion of an elaborate sarcophagus by the famous Baroque architect Fischer von Erlach.

== Sources ==
- Herre, Franz, nd: Eugen von Savoyen Europas heimlicher Herrscher (in German)
