= Treaty of The Hague (1701) =

1701 treaty between England, Austria, and Dutch Republic

Treaty of the Hague (1701)
Treaty of the Second Grand Alliance between Great Britain, (Note: Until 1707, England and Scotland were separate countries under one monarch, William, but treaties were signed by the King of Great Britain.) Austria and the United Provinces
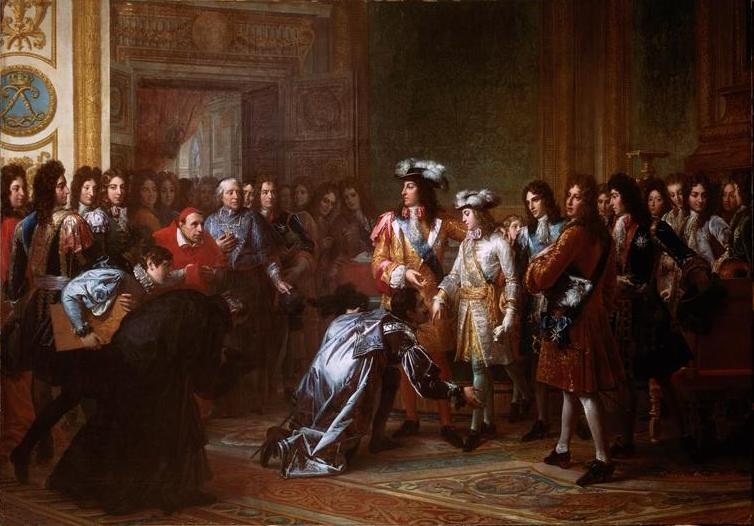
- Proclamation of Philip of Anjou as Philip V of Spain, Versailles: 16 November 1700
- Context: Anti-French Alliance and the War of the Spanish Succession
- Signed: 7 September 1701
- Location: The Hague
- Parties: Habsburg Austria; Dutch Republic; England (Note: As above; the Union Jack or King's Colour is used here for ease of convenience.)

The Treaty of Den Haag, or Treaty of The Hague, was signed on 7 September 1701 between England, the Holy Roman Emperor Leopold I, and the United Provinces. It reconstituted the 1689 anti-French Grand Alliance in response to the issues that resulted in the War of the Spanish Succession.

== Background ==
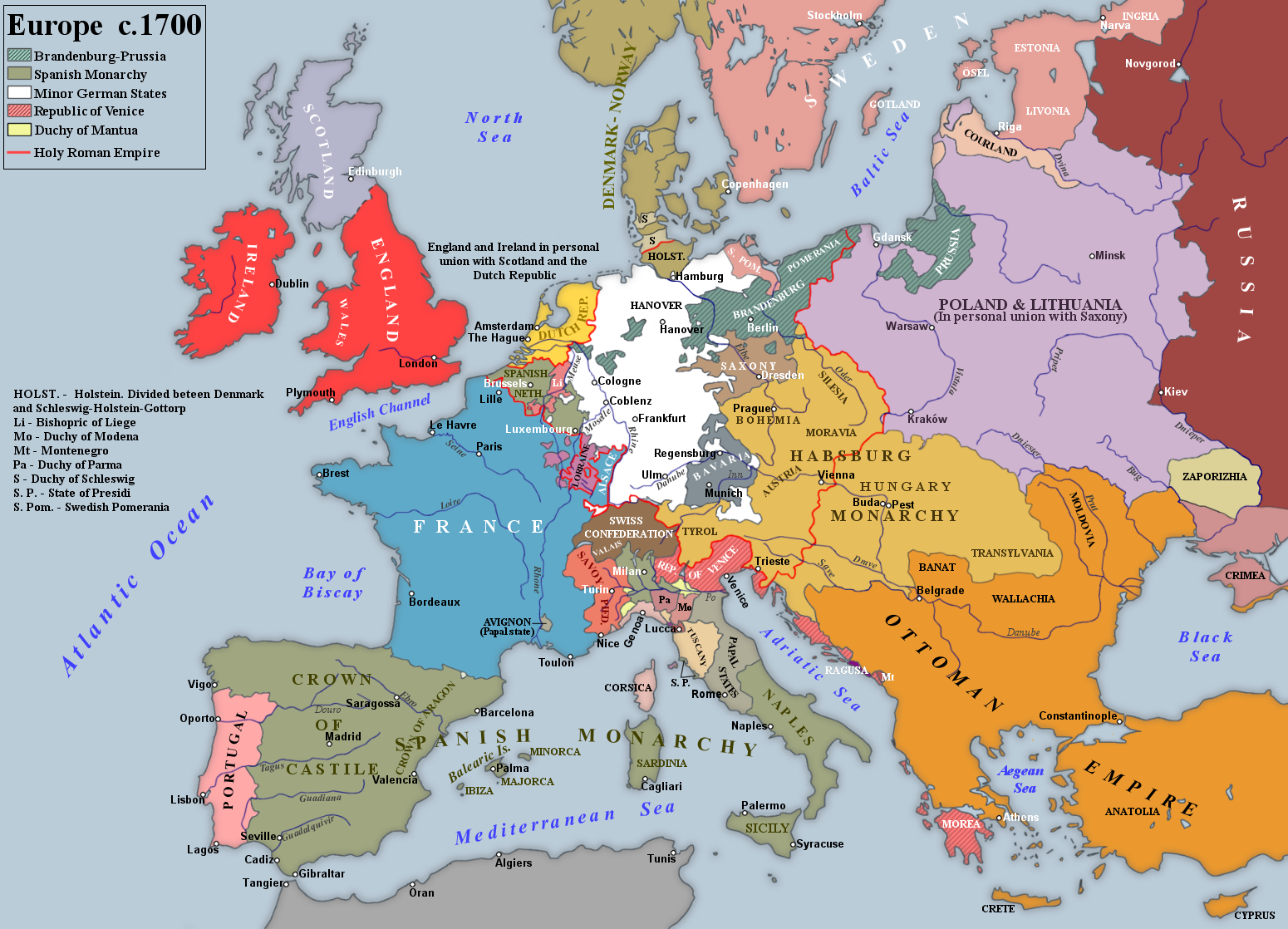
Europe in 1700, at the beginning of the War of the Spanish Succession

The wars of Louis XIV that began in 1667 led to a number of anti-French coalitions, the most significant being the so-called Grand Alliance formed on 20 December 1689 by England, the Dutch Republic and Emperor Leopold. They took part in the 1688-97 Nine Years' War with Spain joining in 1690 and Savoy in 1691. The 1697 Treaty of Ryswick ended the war but failed to resolve the issue of who would succeed Charles II of Spain.

In September 1665, Charles became the last Habsburg King of Spain at the age of three; suffering ill-health throughout his life, by 1697 he was childless and seemed unlikely to survive much longer. Weakened by a century of nearly continuous combat, Spain was no longer the dominant European power but the Spanish Empire remained largely intact, with territories in Italy, the Spanish Netherlands, the Philippines and large parts of the Americas.

Since Charles' closest heirs were either Austrian Habsburgs or French Bourbons, the succession was of great significance to the European balance of power. Despite being long-time opponents, Louis XIV and William III tried to resolve the issue first in the Treaty of The Hague (1698), then the Treaty of London (1700). Negotiated by William and Louis, these partitioned the Spanish Empire without consulting either Emperor Leopold or Spain. Unsurprisingly, the Spanish refused to allow this and when Charles died on 1 November 1700, his will named his heir as Louis' grandson, Philip of Anjou, who became Philip V of Spain on 16 November.

== Negotiations ==
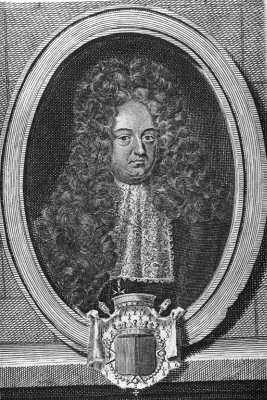
Johann Wenzel Wratislaw von Mitrowitz, Imperial envoy to the Hague talks.

Despite the Partition Treaties, William had remained sceptical of Louis' intentions, given his history of negotiating while simultaneously planning military action and his decision to keep the French army in being after the end of the Nine Years War, rather than the usual practice of disbanding it. His suspicion appeared justified by the proclamation of Philip V but the Tory majority in Parliament would not go to war for the Spanish throne. They also objected to the territorial splits envisaged by the Treaties, specifically the award of Sicily and Naples to France, and tried to impeach the Whig leaders who approved them. As a result, William was forced to recognise Philip as king of Spain, but a foreign observer noted Tory opposition to war included the important qualifier 'so long as English commerce does not suffer.'

Louis either failed to appreciate this or decided to ignore it, and embarked on a series of provocative moves. In early 1701, he registered Philip's claim to the French throne with the Parlement of Paris, raising the possibility of union with Spain, contrary to Charles' will. In February, French troops occupied the Spanish-controlled Duchy of Milan and Duchy of Mantua in Northern Italy, as well as and fortresses in the Spanish Netherlands previously held by the Dutch. This threatened the Dutch monopoly over the Scheldt granted by the 1648 Peace of Münster and English mercantile interests, since control of Antwerp and Ostend would allow France to blockade the Channel at will. Combined with the imposition of French tariffs on English imports and Spain's award of the lucrative Asiento contract on 27 August to the French Guinea Company, Tory opposition to war was gradually eroded.

In March, talks were held with Louis' representative the Comte d'Avaux, who made it clear he would neither comply with the 1700 Treaty or agree to concessions. Parliament now authorised the creation of an anti-French alliance and a force of 10,000 men to support the Dutch, led by Marlborough who was also appointed Envoy to the United Provinces.

Negotiations were held between Marlborough, Anthonie Heinsius, Grand pensionary of Holland and the Austrian envoy Johann Wenzel Wratislaw von Mitrowitz. The main obstacle was the demand by Emperor Leopold for all Spanish territories in Italy while William wanted to restrict this to Milan and the Spanish Netherlands. His experience and dual role as King and Stadtholder made William a powerful figure but his death was widely anticipated; aware much of their influence with Leopold would disappear with him, the Dutch accepted the Austrian position, forcing England to follow.

== Terms ==
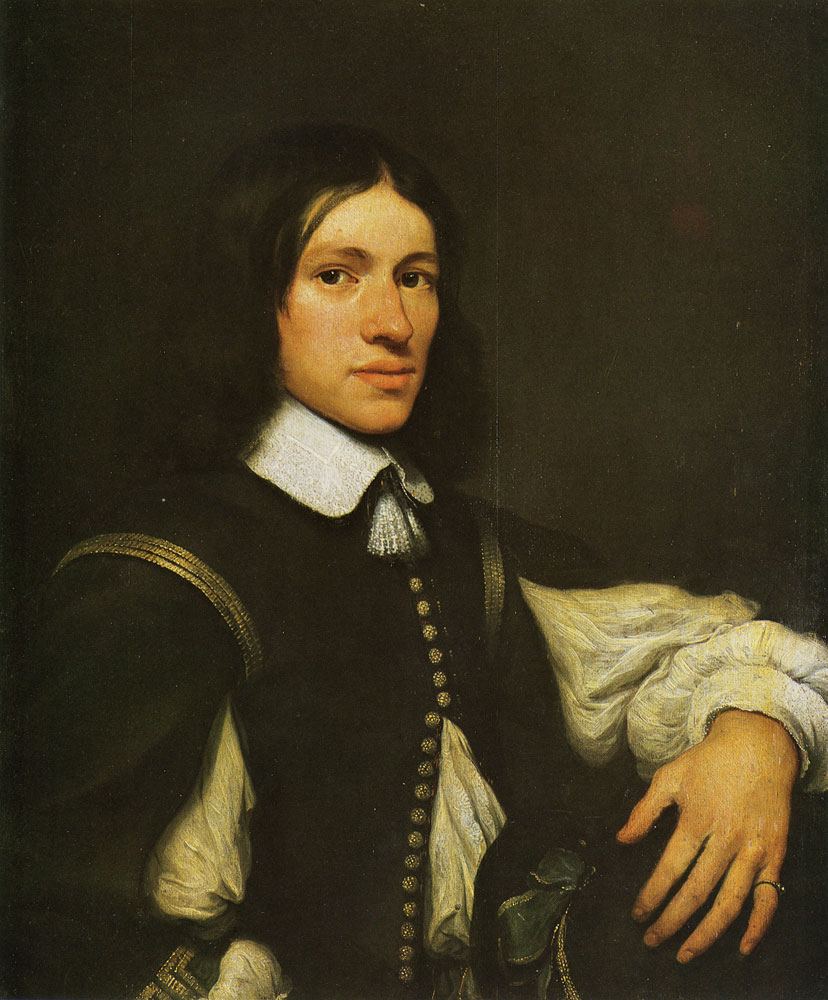
1659 portrait of Heinsius by Gerbrand van den Eeckhout

While ostensibly the war was sparked by a dynastic struggle over the Spanish throne, allocation of territories and commercial interests were equally important. Contemporaries viewed Dutch and English support for the Habsburg cause as primarily driven by a desire for access to the Spanish American markets. Trade was often used as a weapon of policy; between 1690 and 1704, English import duties increased by 400%, with the 1651-1663 Navigation Acts having been a major factor in the Anglo-Dutch Wars. On 6 September, France banned the import of English manufactured goods like cloth and imposed prohibitive duties on a wide range of others.

On 7 September 1701, England, the Emperor Leopold and the Dutch Republic signed the Treaty of The Hague reconstituting the Grand Alliance. In addition to assigning Spanish territories in Italy and the Spanish Netherlands to Austria, its main provisions included securing fortresses held by Dutch garrisons in the Spanish Netherlands as part of a system of forward defence, the Protestant succession in England, commercial access for England and the Dutch Republic to the Spanish Empire but made no reference to placing Archduke Charles on the Spanish throne.

== Aftermath ==
When the exiled James II of England died a few days later on 16 September, Louis reneged on his commitment at Ryswick to accept the result of the 1688 Glorious Revolution and proclaimed his Catholic son James Francis Edward Stuart King of England and Scotland. This ensured English support for war and after William's death on 19 March 1702, Queen Anne and his Dutch successors confirmed their agreement with his policies. The Grand Alliance declared war on France on 15 May 1702, followed on 30 September by the Imperial Diet. The Treaty provisions concealed two important issues; first, neither England nor the Dutch Republic would allow the other to control the Spanish Netherlands and thus preferred to assign it to Austria, for whom as a non-maritime power it was a burden, not an asset. Second, who sat on the Spanish throne concerned England and the Dutch because of the commercial implications, but was far less important to Leopold than the division of Spanish territories in Italy. These tensions would resurface later in the war.

== See also ==
- Grand Alliance (League of Augsburg) (1689)
- List of treaties
- War of the Spanish Succession

== Sources ==
- Falkner, James (2015). The War of the Spanish Succession 1701–1714. Pen and Sword. ISBN 978-1-4738-7290-5.
- Gregg, Edward (1980). Queen Anne (Revised) (The English Monarchs Series) (2001 ed.). Yale University Press. ISBN 0300090242.
- Holmes, Richard; Marlborough: England's Fragile Genius; (Harper, 2008);
- Jones, JR (1980). Britain and the World, 1649-1815. Fontana Press. ISBN 0006337589.
- McKay, Derek; Scott, HM (1983). The Rise of the Great Powers 1648 - 1815 (The Modern European State System). Routledge. ISBN 0582485541.
- Morgan, WT (1931). "Economic Aspects of the Negotiations at Ryswick". Transactions of the Royal Historical Society. 14: 225–249. doi:10.2307/3678514. JSTOR 3678514. S2CID 153412732.
- Schaeper, Thomas (1986). "French and English Trade after Utrecht". Journal for Eighteenth Century Studies. 9 (1). doi:10.1111/j.1754-0208.1986.tb00117.x.
- Schmidt Voges, Inken; Solana, Ana Crespo, eds. (2017). New Worlds?: Transformations in the Culture of International Relations Around the Peace of Utrecht (Politics and Culture in Europe, 1650-1750). Routledge. ISBN 978-1472463906.
- Somerset, Anne (2012). Queen Anne; the Politics of Passion. Harper. ISBN 978-0007203765.
- Stapleton, John M (2007). "Prelude to Rijswijk: William III, Louis XIV, and the Strange Case of Marshal Boufflers". The Western Society of French History. 35. hdl:2027/spo.0642292.0035.006.
- Storrs, Christopher (2006). The Resilience of the Spanish Monarchy 1665-1700. OUP Oxford. ISBN 978-0199246373.
- Ward, William; Leathes, Stanley (1912). The Cambridge Modern History (2010 ed.). Nabu. ISBN 1174382058.
- Wolf, John (1968). Louis XIV. Littlehampton Book Services Ltd. ISBN 978-0575000889.
