= Franz Ferdinand, Count of Kinsky =

Bohemian diplomat and statesman

Franz Ferdinand, Count Kinsky of Wchinitz and Tettau (Czech: František Ferdinand Kinský, German: Franz Ferdinand Graf Kinsky von Wchinitz und Tettau; 1 January 1678, Prague – 12 September 1741, Prague) was a Bohemian diplomat and statesman and High Chancellor of Bohemia.

== Biography ==
Franz Ferdinand Kinsky comes from the Bohemian aristocratic family of Kinsky, which has been documented since the 13th century. He was the third son of Count Wenceslaus Norbert, Count of Kinsky and his first wife Anna Maria Franziska Countess Martinitz (1652–1694). Franz Ferdinand studied at the original University of Leuven (Note: Predecessor university of the Catholic University of Leuven (1834–1968), often prefixed old, as in 'Old University of Leuven'.) in Flanders. After completing his studies, he entered the civil service at the age of 27 in 1705, following his father's example, and was appointed Vice-Chancellor of Bohemia. Kinsky quickly climbed the hierarchical ladder, being appointed 'Court Chancellor' in 1715 and High Chancellor of Bohemia on 24 June 1723.

Kinsky served as a loyal diplomat two emperors: Joseph I and Charles VI. In 1708 he was sent by Emperor Joseph I as a "Churbohemian comitial envoy" to the "Churfürsten Council" in Frankfurt am Main. Three years later he worked in the same capacity very successfully in the preparation of the election of Charles VI as Emperor. He was able to dispel the misgivings about the election of another Habsburg and made it possible for the Elector Charles VI to be elected Roman-German Emperor on 12 October 1711. He also attended the coronation of Charles VI in Frankfurt.

In 1721, he was Imperial envoy in the 1721 papal conclave of the election of Pope Innocent XIII in Rome.

In 1722 the Emperor sent him to the Diet of Hungary in Pressburg. At this Diet, the Hungarians should accept the Pragmatic Sanction of Emperor Charles VI. Also negotiated was a restricted practice of the Protestant faith in the Kingdom of Hungary, for which Kinsky campaigned. However, this request was rejected by the Diet. In 1729, he returned to Pressburg as 'Royal Commissioner' to clarify the religious situation of the Protestants in Hungary. However, this attempt was also unsuccessful.

On 27 November 1731, he was accepted into the Order of the Golden Fleece.

On 3 January 1736, Franz Ferdinand resigned and retired to private life. As early as 1720, he had acquired Eckartsau Castle in Lower Austria, which he had remodeled into a magnificent baroque palace based on plans by Joseph Emanuel Fischer von Erlach, under the direction of the imperial architect Christian Alexander Oedtl. Here he spent part of the last years of his life. Franz Ferdinand Kinsky died on 12 September 1741 in his Prague Palace and was buried in the crypt of Prague's St. Salvator Church.

== Marriage and children ==
Franz Ferdinand Kinsky was married twice and had a total of 16 children. His first wife was Countess Marie Therese Eleonore von Fünfkirchen (1675–1729), and his second wife Countess Maria Augustina Countess Pálffy von Erdőd (1714–1759). He had:

- Joseph, Count Kinsky (1731–1804), a Field Marshal in Imperial service
- Franz Joseph, Count Kinsky (1739–1805), an Imperial General in the French Revolutionary Wars

== Sources ==
- Deutsche Biographie
- BLKÖ
- Genealogy
