= Wenzel Norbert Octavian, Count of Kinsky =

Czech noble and Bohemian High Chancellor

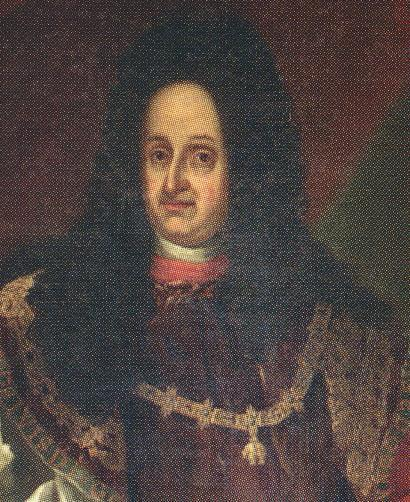
Wenzel Norbert, Count of Kinsky (Anonymous)

Wenzel Norbert Octavian, Count Kinsky of Wchinitz and Tettau (Czech: Václav Norbert Oktavian Kinský; 1 April 1642, Prague – 3 January 1719, Vienna) was a noble and Bohemian High Chancellor.

== Biography ==
Wenzel came from the Bohemian noble family of Kinsky of Wchinitz and Tettau and was the younger brother of Francis, Count of Kinsky of Wchinitz and Tettau.

After studying law at Charles University in Prague and his Grand Tour, Kinsky entered the civil service. He became President of the Court of Appeal in 1688, Vice-Chairman of Bohemia in 1689, Privy and Conference Councilor, Supreme Court Judge in 1696 and Supreme Chamber Treasurer and Imperial Commissioner in the Bohemian Parliament in 1701.

From 1705 to 1711 he was Bohemian Chancellor in Vienna under Emperor Joseph I. For his services he was made a Knight of the Order of the Golden Fleece in 1711 (No. 610).

=== Marriage and children ===
Count Kinsky married twice, firstly to Countess Anna Franziska von Martinic (1652-1694) and secondly to Baroness Maria Anna Theresia von Nesselrode-Ehreshoven (d. 1719). The two marriages produced 16 children, including:

- Franz Ferdinand (1678–1741), Bohemian High Chancellor, had issue.
- Stephan Wilhelm (1679–1749), 1st Prince (1746 Bohemian and 1747 Imperial Prince); his only son Franz-Joseph (1726–1748), 2nd Prince, died without a male heir.
- Philip Joseph (1700–1749), Bohemian High Chancellor, advisor to Empress Maria Theresa. Had issue.
- Maria Theresa (1700–1775), married Lajos Batthyány
- Aloisia Stephanie (1707–1786), married Franz Wenzel von Wrbna-Freudenthal, mother of Eugen Wenzel von Wrbna-Freudenthal.
- Franz Karl (1709–1734), killed in the Battle of Guastalla

== Sources ==
- ADB
- BLKÖ
