= Henry IV of Plauen =

Burgrave of Plauen

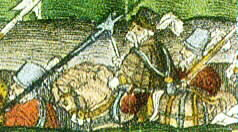
- Henry IV during the siege of the city of Hof, contemporary colored woodcut by Hans Glaser
- Born: 1510, probably on 24 August; Hartenštejn Castle
- Died: 19 May 1554; Stadtsteinach
- Burial: Plauen
- Father: Henry III, Burgrave of Plauen
- Mother: Barbara of Anhalt-Köthen

Henry IV of Plauen (1510, probably on 24 August, Hartenštejn Castle – 19 May 1554, Stadtsteinach, during the siege of the Plassenburg), was High Chancellor of the Kingdom of Bohemia, Burgrave of Meissen, Lord of Plauen, Gera, Greiz, Schleiz and Bad Lobenstein, Lord of Toužim, Hartenštejn Castle, Andělská Hora Castle and Žlutice. He also used the traditional title of Lord of Lázně Kynžvart and, apart from an intermezzo in 1547, he was Lord of Bečov nad Teplou as well.

== Life ==
Henry IV was a member of the elder line of the House of Plauen. He was the son of Burgrave Henry III of Plauen († 1519) from his second marriage to Barbara of Anhalt-Köthen (1487-1532/33).

=== Youth ===
After the death of his father, Henry grew up first under the care of his mother, and, after her remarriage in 1521, under the supervision of a guardian specially appointed by his mother: Zdenko Leo Rosenthal, the High Burgrave to the crown of Bohemia, on Hartenštejn Castle. According to his father's testament of 27 February 1515 Hartenštejn was only for him and could not be regarded as part of the dowry of a possible remarriage of his mother. In June 1528 his mother, Barbara divorced from John the Younger of Kolovrat to Mašťov and called herself Burgravine of Meissen again. She left her estate Krásný Dvůr in Mašťov and went first to Toužim and later, in August 1529, back to her Wittum Štědrá Castle. Henry asked to join him in Hartenštejn, but she refused.

=== At the court in Prague ===
His guardian brought him in time to the court in Prague. On 5 April 1530 King Ferdinand reaffirmed the Burgraviate of Meissen as Henry's fief. He wasn't concerned about the Meissen lands: immediately after the death of the last member of the House of Meinhering, the Meissen lands had been seized by troops of Elector Frederick the Warlike of Saxony of the House of Wettin. Henry was concerned about the title and the position associated with it and the seat in the Imperial Diet he was entitled to as sovereign prince. In 1530, Henry accompanied King Ferdinand as one of the four Schenks to the Diet of Augsburg. On 19 September 1530 Emperor Charles V confirmed his fief. In the summer of 1532 Henry married Margaret, Countess of Salm and Neuburg. The young couple moved in August 1532 to the Andělská Hora Castle. Before Henry had convinced his mother to leave her Wittum and join them. However, she died about half a year later.

In 1532 Henry's territory consisted of four baronies: Toužim, Hartenštejn, Andělská Hora and Prohor. In 1537 Prohor again belonged to Toužim and Hartenštejn and Andělská Hora had been united: an interest an income tax register from this period calls it Andělská-Hartenštejn. In July 1537 Henry succeeded in purchasing the barony of Luditz rule. Though it was small, it nicely rounded out his territory.

Also in July 1537, negotiations in Torgau, chaired by the Ernestine Elector John Frederick the Magnanimous, led to a contract of inheritance was agreed with the Lords Reuss of Plauen at Greiz about who would inherit Gera in case the Lord of Gera would die childless. On 7 August 1550, Henry of Gera died childless at Castle Burgk, and Henry IV inherited his fief. From that point, Henry IV, in fact owned all of the Vogtland, the fief that King Ferdinand had assigned to him. His whole life, Henry IV had to defend himself in quarrels with his half brother Henry the Bastard and after the end of the Schmalkaldic War, he had to deal with litigation by the Reuss family, who tried to regain the Lordship of Gera.

On 22 January 1542, King Ferdinand appointed Henry IV to High Chancellor of the Crown of Bohemia, King's Counsel and Treasurer.

=== Schmalkaldic war ===
Henry was instrumental in the Treaty of Prague that was sealed on 14 November 1546 between King Ferdinand of Bohemia and the Albertine Duke Maurice of Saxony, implementing the imperial ban against the Ernestine electors of Saxony. As High Chancellor of Bohemia, Henry participated on the side of Ferdinand and his brother, Emperor Charles V in the Battle of Mühlberg on 24 April 1547 and in the Capitulation of Wittenberg on 19 May 1547 that ended the Schmalkaldic War. In the same position he was in Prague in late June 1547, where Ferdinand held the Bohemian Diet, which became known as "the bloody" in history, in which Ferdinand judged over the Bohemian estates and rebellious nobles. From confiscated lands, Henry received the castle and town Bečov nad Teplou, which his great-grandfather had bought in 1410 and which his father had sold in 1495 to Lord Pflugk. However, Ferdinand demanded it back shortly thereafter. In September 1547 Henry's troops occupied the castle of Greiz and drove out the princes of the Reuss. On 24 May 1548, by deed of Emperor Charles V at the Diet of Augsburg, Henry IV was made Imperial Princely Burgrave of Meissen. On 21 January 1549, King Ferdinand issued a solemn Patent to Henry of Reuss and Gera. This made Henry officially Lord of Greiz and Gera. The deeds for the purchase of the Lordship of Plauen, Oelsnitz and the district of Pausa followed soon after, on 10 April 1549.

In the summer of 1551 Henry had a time off from his job as Chancellor for the first time in many years and could dedicate himself to his traditional Bohemian dominions and the new dominions in the Vogtland. He called representatives of all Vogtland estates to a common diet in Schleiz he opened on 28 July 1551. In Plauen he established a governor as the supreme authority for all Vogtland estates. For Greiz he issued on 8 September 1551 his first regulation of the judiciary and of the police. On 11 September, these were followed by a drink tax and the Imperial penny regulation. In mid-October, he left the Vogtland, first went to Prague and then to Vienna. He never returned to his Vogtland possessions. Although a Catholic his whole life, he fought all attempts at Contra-Reformation of his Vogtland barons, promoted the Protestant Church and in 1552 he adopted a burgraviate Church Constitution, designed by the Protestant superintendent of Plauen.

=== Peace of Passau and combat against Albert Alcibiades ===
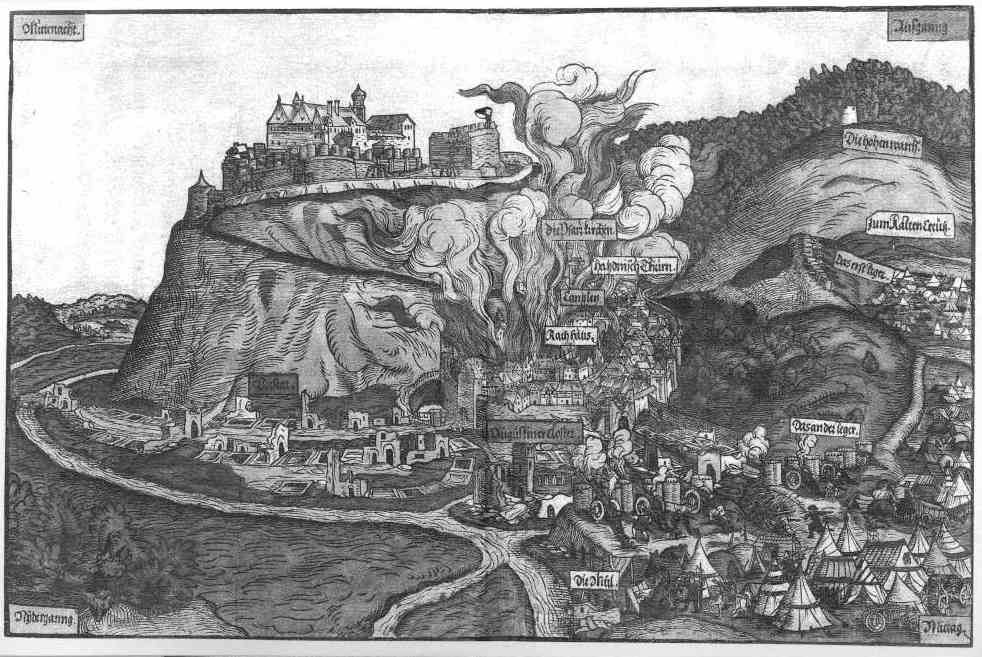
siege of the castle Plass, contemporary wood engraving by Hans Glaser

On 15 and 16 March 1552, Henry IV met Elector Maurice of Saxony in Leipzig and prepared him for a meeting between Maurice and Ferdinand, which took place on 18 April 1552 in Linz. They agreed on principles that formed the foundation for an agreement reached in Passau on 22 Juli 1552. King Ferdinand then asked Henry IV to convince Emperor Charles V and the latter signed the Peace of Passau on 15 August in Munich.

During the subsequent Turkish military campaign, Heinrich stayed until the end of November in Győr. As High Chancellor of Bohemia, Henry IV was actively involved in establishing peace throughout the empire.

On 29 June 1553 Henry and Maurice met in Nordhausen and discussed final details of their action against Margrave Albrecht II Alcibiades of Brandenburg-Kulmbach. Shortly thereafter, on 9 July 1553, Maurice was mortally wounded in the Battle of Sievershausen. Henry now took over the role of the leader of the allies against Albert Alcibiades. On 7 August, Henry began the siege of Hof. On 28 September the city was captured, but on 11 October it was recaptured by Albert's troops. On 27 November the allies captured Hof again. Henry IV appointed Georg Wolf of Kotzau as governor of Hof. Then the siege of the Plassenburg near Kulmbach began, during which, on the morning of 19 May 1554, Henry IV died in Stadtsteinach. On 24 May he was buried, according to his last wishes in the St John's Church in Plauen.

== Marriage and issue ==
Henry married before 29 August 1532 Margaret, daughter of Count Nicholas I of Salm and Neuburg, with whom he had two sons:

- Henry V, Burgrave of Plauen (1533–1568), Burgrave of Meissen

married in 1555 princess Dorothy Catherine of Brandenburg-Ansbach (1538–1604)

- Henry VI, Burgrave of Plauen (1536–1572), Burgrave of Meissen,

married firstly, in 1564, Princess Catherine of Brunswick-Lüneburg (1548–1565)
married secondly, in 1566, Princess Anna of Pomerania-Stettin (1531–1592)
