= Joseph, Count Kinsky =

Joseph Graf von Kinsky
- Born: February 7, 1731; Prague, Bohemia
- Died: February 7, 1804 (aged 72) Vienna, Austria
- Allegiance: Habsburg Monarchy
- Branch: General Staff
- Rank: Field Marshal
- Conflicts: War of the Austrian Succession; Seven Years' War; War of the Bavarian Succession; Austro-Turkish War (1788–1791); French Revolutionary Wars
- Awards: Military Order of Maria Theresa Knights Cross, 1762

Joseph, Count Kinsky, also known as Joseph, Count Kinsky von Wchinitz und Tettau, was a field marshal in imperial service of the House of Habsburg. He was born in Prague, Bohemia, on 22 February 1731 and died in Vienna, Austria, on 7 February 1804. He was one of four members of the House of Kinsky to enter imperial Habsburg service in the eighteenth century, including a younger and older brother, his uncle and his nephew; his father was a diplomat for the House of Habsburg, and other relatives include diplomats and imperial officials of the Habsburg empire.

== Family ==
Joseph, Count von Kinsky was the fifth of nine children of Francis Ferdinand Kinzky z Vchynic a Tetova, Privy Councillor of the Kingdom of Bohemia (1723) (1 January 1678 – 13 September 1741), and the first child of his father's second wife (married 10 October 1730), Countess Maria Augustina Pálffy ab Erdöd (28 August 1714 – 3 March 1759). He never married. His younger brother, Franz Joseph, Count Kinsky (1739–1805), became a Feldzeugmeister in Austrian service. Of his older siblings, the first three died in childhood and the fourth, Leopold Ferdinand (1713–1760), married the Princess Maria Christine von und zu Liechtenstein. They produced the family from which some of the current Kinskys are descended. Leopold Ferdinand served the Habsburgs in the military during the Seven Years' War, and achieved the rank of General-major.

== Career ==
Little is known about Joseph's early military service, which included campaigns in the War of the Austrian Succession, the Seven Years' War, the War of the Bavarian Succession, and Habsburg border campaigns against the Ottoman Empire, 1778–92. He was promoted to major general on 24 June 1767, effective 4 July 1761. In 1771, he was appointed lieutenant field marshal, and in 1787, general of cavalry. In 1787, he became commanding general of the army in Hungary, and in September 1790, he became commanding general in Upper and Lower Austria, a position he held until 5 September 1800. From November 1788 until April 1789, he was also commander of the main Habsburg army. In 1796, he was promoted to field marshal.

He received the Knights Cross of the Military Order of Maria Theresa on 30 April 1762. He was also Colonel Proprietor (Inhaber) of the Chevauxléger Regiment No. 7 [light dragoon regiment] from 1773 a position he held until his death in 1804. After 1800, he was also an Imperial Privy Councilor.

== See also ==
- Field Marshals of the Hereditary States of the House of Austria

== Sources ==
=== Bibliography ===
- Smith, Digby. Joseph Graf von Kinsky Leopold Kudrna and Digby Smith (compilers). A Biographical Dictionary of all Austrian Generals in the French Revolutionary and Napoleonic Wars, 1792–1815. The Napoleon Series, Robert Burnham, editor in chief. April 2008 version. Accessed 23 January 2010.
