= Church of St. James the Greater (Prague) =

Church in Prague, Czech Republic

Basilica of St James the Greater
- Bazilika svatého Jakuba Většího
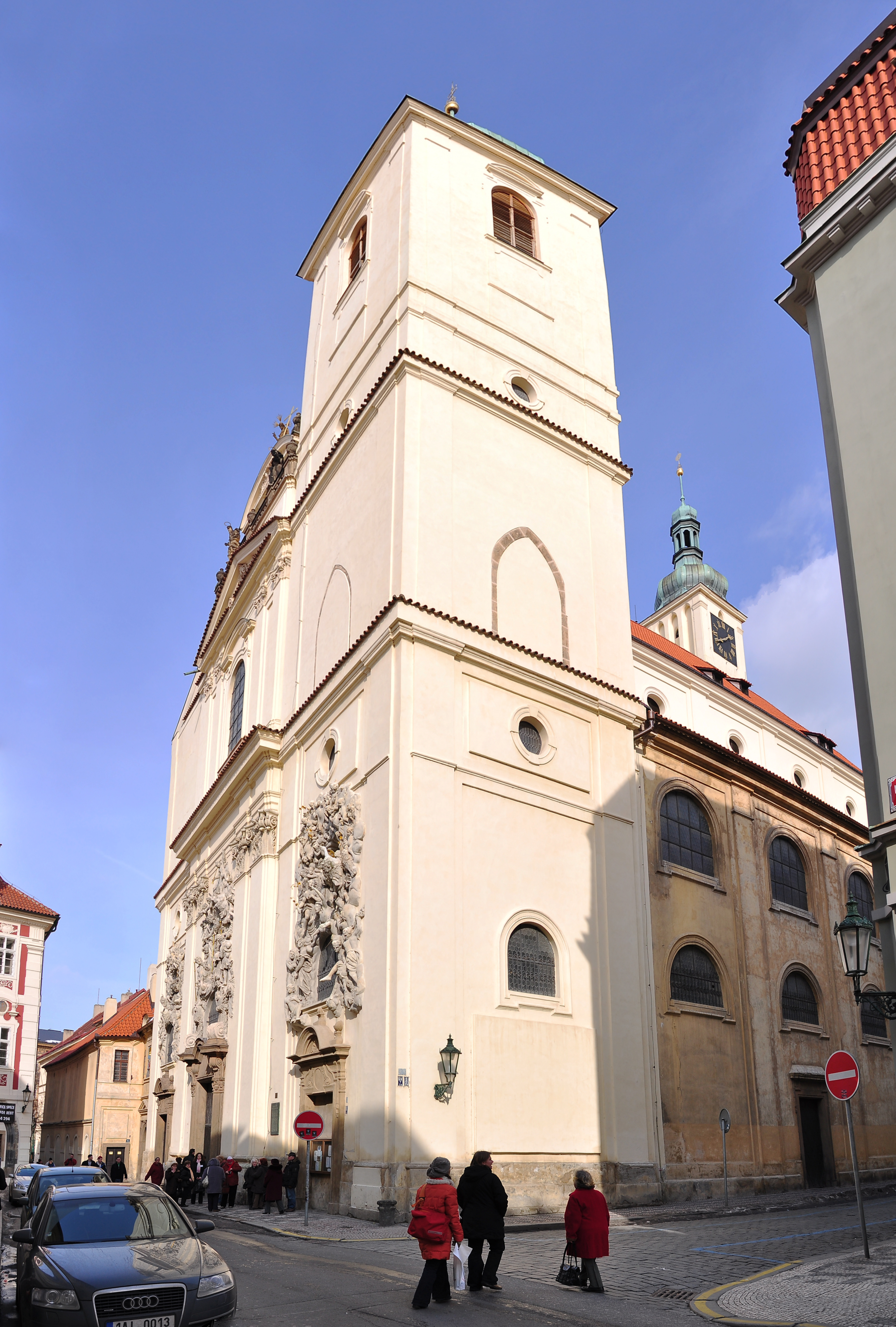

- Location in Prague
- 50°05′18″N 14°25′30″E
- Location: Prague
- Country: Czech Republic
- Denomination: Catholic

History
- Status: Active
- Founded: 13th century
- Dedication: St James the Greater

Architecture
- Style: Baroque

Administration
- Diocese: Prague

Clergy
- Archbishop: Dominik Duka

The Basilica of St. James (Czech: Bazilika svatého Jakuba Většího) in the Old Town of Prague, Czech Republic. The church is home to the Madonna Pietatis and the tomb of Count Vratislav of Mitrovice.

== Original church ==
The church was built in the 13th century (1232) for the Minorites. After the fire of 1366 it was rebuilt in the Gothic architecture style. The foundation of the original church was related to the acquisition of the relics of Ottokar I of Bohemia. The exact location of this original church and its appearance are not known, since the church was destroyed in a fire in 1689, during the Nine Years' War. The fire is believed to have been started by people working for Louis XIV of France.

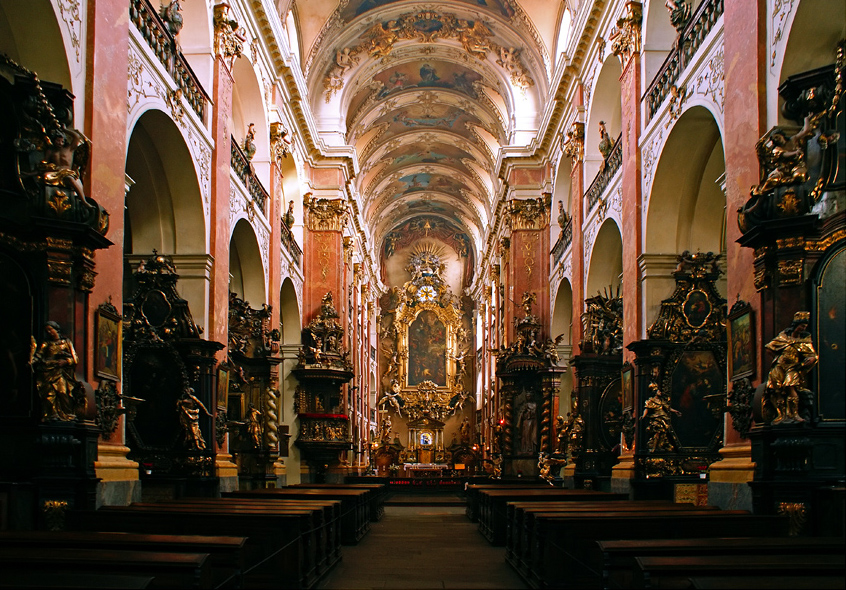
Interior of the basilica

== Present church ==
When it was rebuilt, it was rebuilt in the Baroque architecture style. The facade stucco figures were made by Ottavio Mosto from Italy.The rebuilding included the addition of over 20 altars. Artists such as Jan Jiří Heinsch, Václav Vavřinec Reiner, and Petr Brandl created paintings for the altars. In 1702, an organ was installed. In 1974 the church was granted the honorary title of minor basilica by Pope Paul VI.

The church is the final resting place for Count Vratislav of Mitrovice, Bohemian Chancellor of Holy Roman Emperor Joseph I, who died in Vienna in 1712, but whose remains were transferred to Prague in 1714 after the completion of the magnificent baroque tomb by Johann Bernhard Fischer von Erlach. There is also a mummified forearm to the right of the tomb entrance, dating back over 400 years. The arm is the arm of a jewel thief who tried to steal from the high altar, which has a statue of the Virgin Mary. It is believed that when the thief tried to steal the jewels, Mary grabbed his arm and would not let go, therefore his arm was cut off by monks.

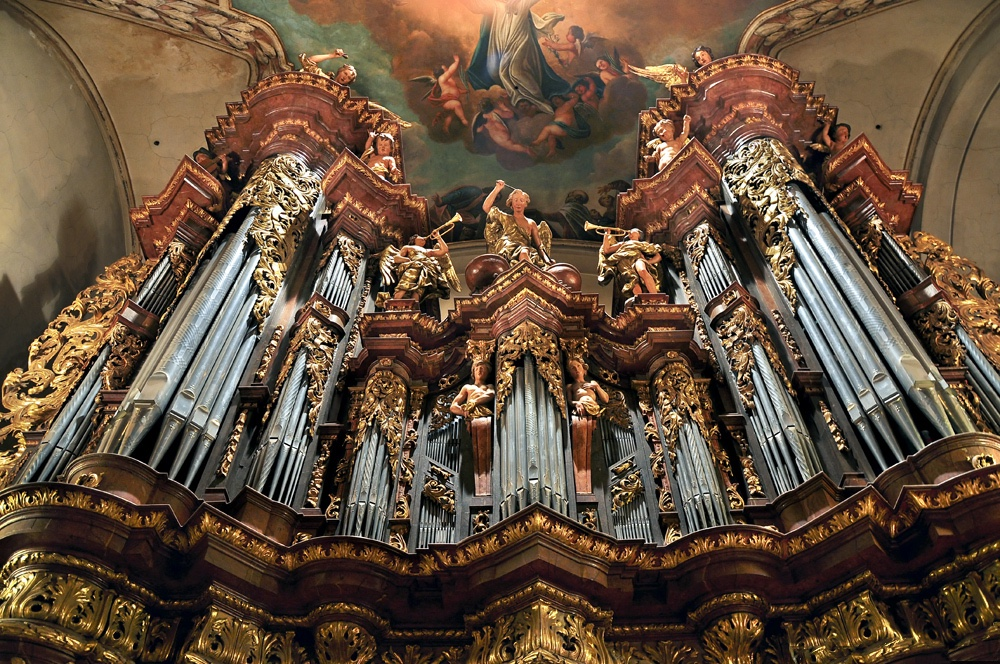
Organ of the basilica

== Organ ==
The original organ, dating from 1705, is the work of famous Czech organist Abraham Starka of Loket. Over the centuries the organ underwent changes. In 1754 the first reconstruction took place by František Katzer. Again this took place in 1906 by Josef Černý and Josef Rejna. Another intervention took place in 1941. The organ then was adapted for modern composition. The last major reconstruction was carried between 1981 and 1982 where Starka's original sounds were restored, for the most part with the original pipes, and preserved many interesting romantic colours. The present instrument has four manuals, 91 stops and 8,277 pipes.
