= 1566 celestial phenomenon over Basel =

Historical astronomical event

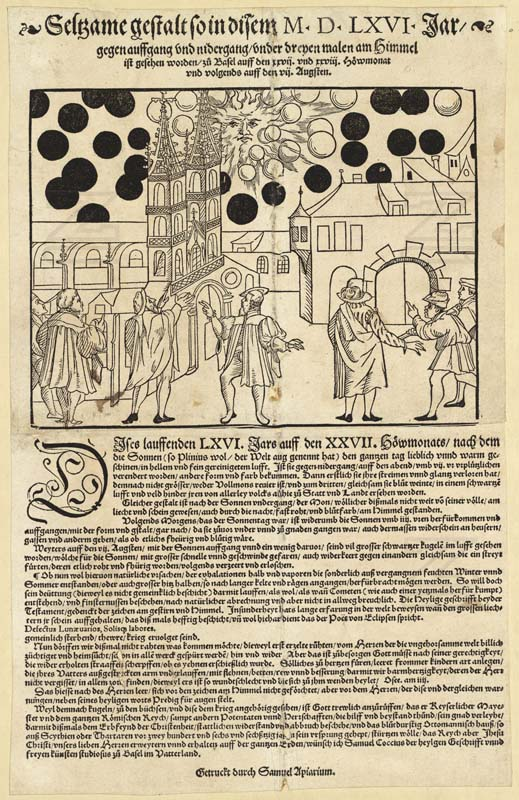
- Flugblatt of Basel 1566, by Samuel Apiarius and Samuel Coccius
- Date: 7 August 1566
- Time: Morning
- Location: Basel, Switzerland
- Type: Celestial phenomenon
- Cause: Unknown; possibly sun dog, atmospheric optical phenomenon, or interpreted as UFO
- Participants: Witnesses in Basel
- Outcome: Widely interpreted as omen; chronicled in pamphlets and woodcuts

A series of mass sightings of celestial phenomena occurred in 1566 above Basel, Switzerland. The Basel pamphlet of 1566 describes unusual sunrises and sunsets. Celestial phenomena were said to have "fought" together in the form of numerous red and black balls in the sky before the rising sun. The report has been discussed among historians and meteorologists. The phenomenon has been interpreted by some ufologists to be a sky battle between unidentified flying objects. The leaflet written by historian Samuel Coccius reported it as a religious event. The Basel pamphlet of 1566 is not the only one of its kind. In the 15th and 16th centuries, many leaflets wrote of "miracles" and "sky spectacles".

== History ==
The event is reported to have taken place in Basel, Switzerland, in 1566. According to Samuel Coccius, on 27–28 July and 7 August, many local witnesses in Basel reported seeing three celestial phenomena. The first is described as an unusual sunset, in which the sun lost its rays and appeared blood-red, followed by a nearly full moon that stood red in the sky all night; the second as a red sun rising the next morning; and the third like a cloud of black spheres in front of the rising sun. No lunar eclipse occurred on these dates; the lunar eclipses of 1566 fell on 4 May and 28 October. These reports were published in a broadsheet printed in Basel that same year and were later included in the Wickiana collection in Zürich.

== The phenomenon described ==
The text of the broadsheet can be translated as giving the following description of the event:

It happened in 1566 three times, on 27 and 28 of July, and on August 7, against the sunrise and sunset; we saw strange shapes in the sky above Basel.

During the year 1566, on the 27th of July, after the sun had shone warm on the clear, bright skies, and then around 9 pm, it suddenly took a different shape and color. First, the sun lost all its radiance and luster, and it was no bigger than the full moon, and finally it seemed to weep tears of blood and the air behind him went dark. And he was seen by all the people of the city and countryside. In much the same way also the moon, which has already been almost full and has shone through the night, assuming an almost blood-red color in the sky. The next day, Sunday, the sun rose at about six o'clock and slept with the same appearance it had when it was lying before. He lit the houses, streets and around as if everything was blood-red and fiery. At the dawn of August 7, we saw large black spheres coming and going with great speed and precision before the sun and chattered as if they led a fight. Many of them were fiery red and, soon crumbled and then extinguished.

== See also ==
- 1561 celestial phenomenon over Nuremberg
- 1665 celestial phenomenon over Stralsund
- List of reported UFO sightings
