= List of Bohemian high chancellors =

The list of Bohemian high chancellors gives an overview of the Habsburg high chancellors in Bohemia (German: böhmischen Oberstkanzler; Czech: Český Nejvyšší kancléř), between 1526 and 1749.

== Bohemian High Chancellor ==
In 1526, the Kingdom of Bohemia became part of Habsburg Austria. King Ferdinand I established the Bohemian Court Chancellery (Böhmische Hofkanzlei) with the High Supreme Chancellor at its head. He was responsible for the administration of the Lands of the Bohemian Crown.

Initially, the Bohemian Court Chancellery has a certain autonomy, but this decreased over the years.
The seat of this Court Chancellery was initially the Old royal palace in the Prague Castle. But after the Bohemian Revolt was suppressed in the Battle of the White Mountain in 1620, the Court Chancellery was transferred to Vienna and placed solely under the control of the Austrian King. In 1749 the Bohemian Court Chancellery was dissolved completely and organizationally merged with the Austrian Court Chancellery.

== List of chancellors ==
- 1526–1531 Adam I von Neuhaus (Adam I. z Hradce)
- 1531–1537 Johann Pflug von Rabenstein (Jan Pluh z Rabštejna)
- 1538–1542 Wolfgang Kraiger von Kraigk
- 1542–1554 Henry IV, Burgrave of Plauen
- 1554–1565 Joachim von Neuhaus (Jáchym z Hradce)
- 1566–1582 Wratislaw von Pernstein
- 1583–1584 vacant
- 1585–1593 Adam II von Neuhaus (Adam II. z Hradce)
- 1594–1596 vacant
- 1597–1598 Georg Bořita von Martinitz
- 1599–1628 Zdenko Adalbert Poppel, Prince of Lobkowicz
- 1628–1652 Vilém Slavata of Chlum
- 1644–1651 George Adam Borzitza, Count of Martinitz (de facto since 1637)
- 1652–1683 John Hartwig, Count of Nostitz
- 1683–1699 Francis, Count of Kinsky of Wchinitz and Tettau
- 1700–1705 John Francis, Count of Wrbna and Freudenthal
- 1705–1711 Wenceslaus Norbert, Count of Kinsky
- 1711–1712 Johann Wenzel Graf Wratislaw von Mitrowitz
- 1713–1723 Leopold Josef Graf Schlick
- 1723–1736 Francis Ferdinand, Count of Kinsky
- 1736–1738 Wilhelm Albrecht Graf Krakowsky von Kolowrat
- 1738–1745 Philip Kinsky of Wchinitz and Tettau
- 1745–1749 Friedrich August von Harrach-Rohrau

== See also ==
- Supreme Burgrave of the Kingdom of Bohemia
- Supreme Marshal of the Kingdom of Bohemia

== Sources ==
- Michael Hochedlinger, Petr Maťa, Thomas Winkelbauer (Hrsg.): Verwaltungsgeschichte der Habsburgermonarchie in der Frühen Neuzeit. Band 1: Hof und Dynastie, Kaiser und Reich, Zentralverwaltungen, Kriegswesen und landesfürstliches Finanzwesen. Böhlau Verlag, Wien 2019, ISBN 978-3-205-20766-5, Page 482
- Thomas Fellner: Oberste böhmische Kanzler. In: Die österreichische Zentralverwaltung Geschichtliche Übersicht. Anhang. Verzeichnis der Inhaber der obersten Hofwürden und der Vorstände der Zentralbehörden. Wien 1907 Page 282
