= Georg Wolf of Kotzau =

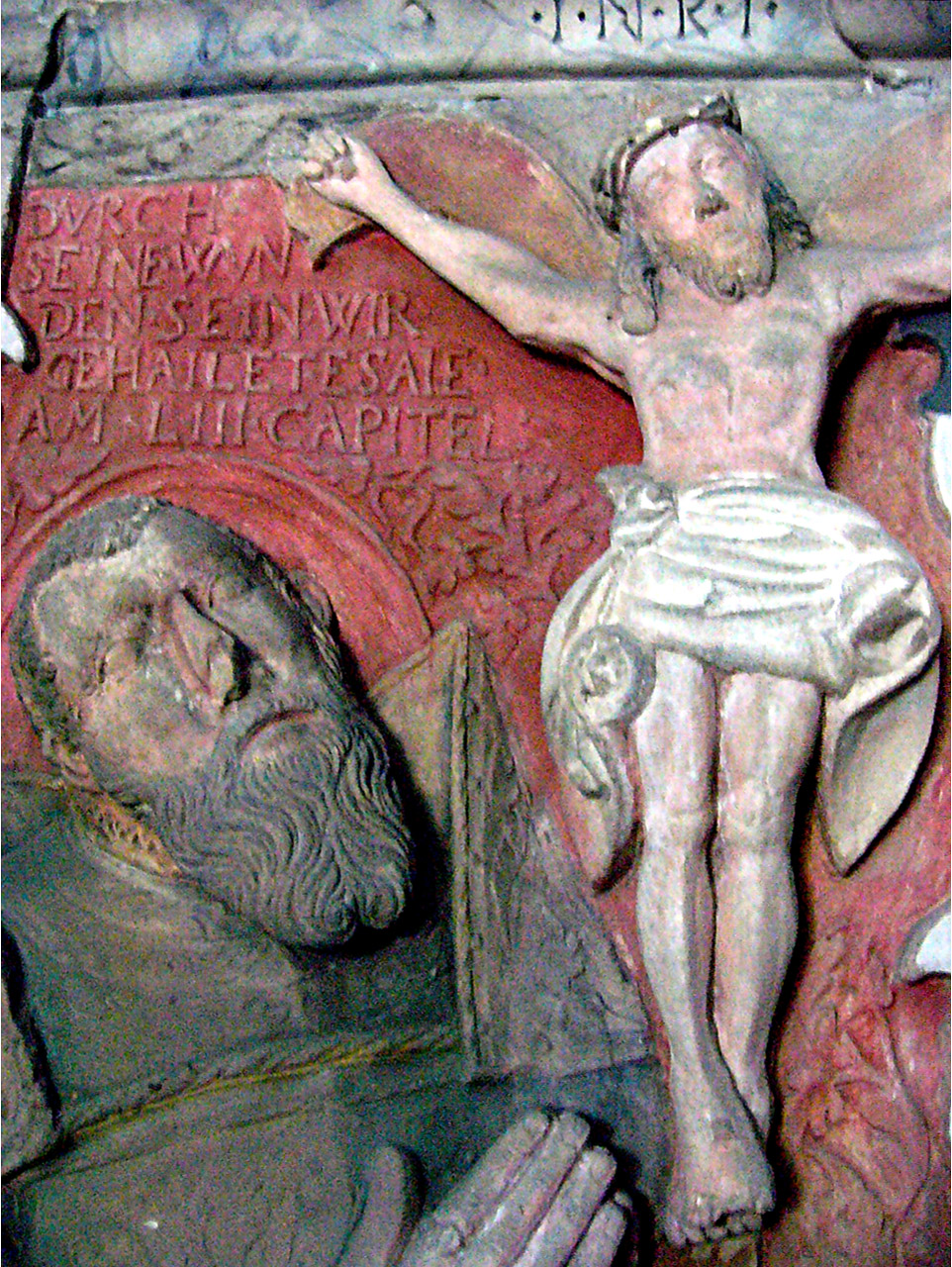
- Painting of Georg Wolf kneeling before the cross (detail of his grave)
- Died: 1560
- Buried: Oberkotzau

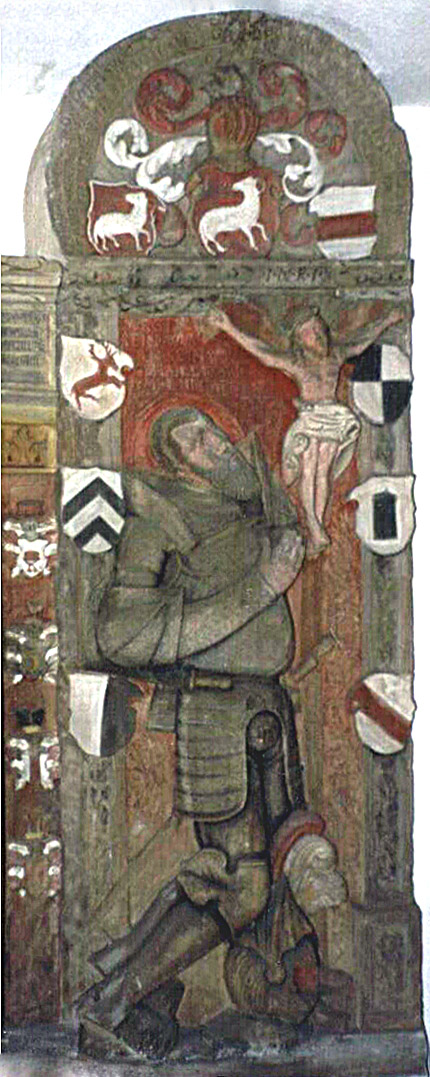
Painted grave of George Wolf of Kotzau

Georg Wolf of Kotzau, nicknamed the rich (died 1560) was an Imperial Knight and Amtmann and Governor.

Georg Wolf of Kotzau was a member of the ancient knightly family of Kotzau. According to the genealogists Alban of Dobeneck, Georg Wolf of Kotzau was a son of Hans von Kotzau, who was Amtmann of Münchberg and who bought Oberkotzau Castle, Fattigau Castle and Burgstall Haideck from his brothers.

Georg served Margrave Albert II Alcibiades of Brandenburg-Kulmbach as Amtmann at Epprechtstein Castle and later in Rehau. In the Schmalkaldic War, he followed the call of his sovereign to defend the Plassenburg. Later he went into the service of Henry IV of Plauen and was governor of the Plauen-Voigtsberg Castle area. At the outbreak of the Second Margrave War, Georg, like most of his peers, refused knight service to his Margrave; instead he openly joined the other side and, after the Siege of Hof in 1533, he briefly served as governor of Hof. After the defeat of Albert Alcibiades, the Hohenzollerns made their influence felt and gave the principality of Brandenburg-Kulmbach to George Frederick I of Brandenburg-Ansbach-Kulmbach. George Frederick burned down some of Kotzau's castles, include the manor at Fattigau, to punish, in his view, the breakaway Georg Wolf, despite the latter holding letters of protection from the Emperor Charles V and King Ferdinand I of Bohemia.

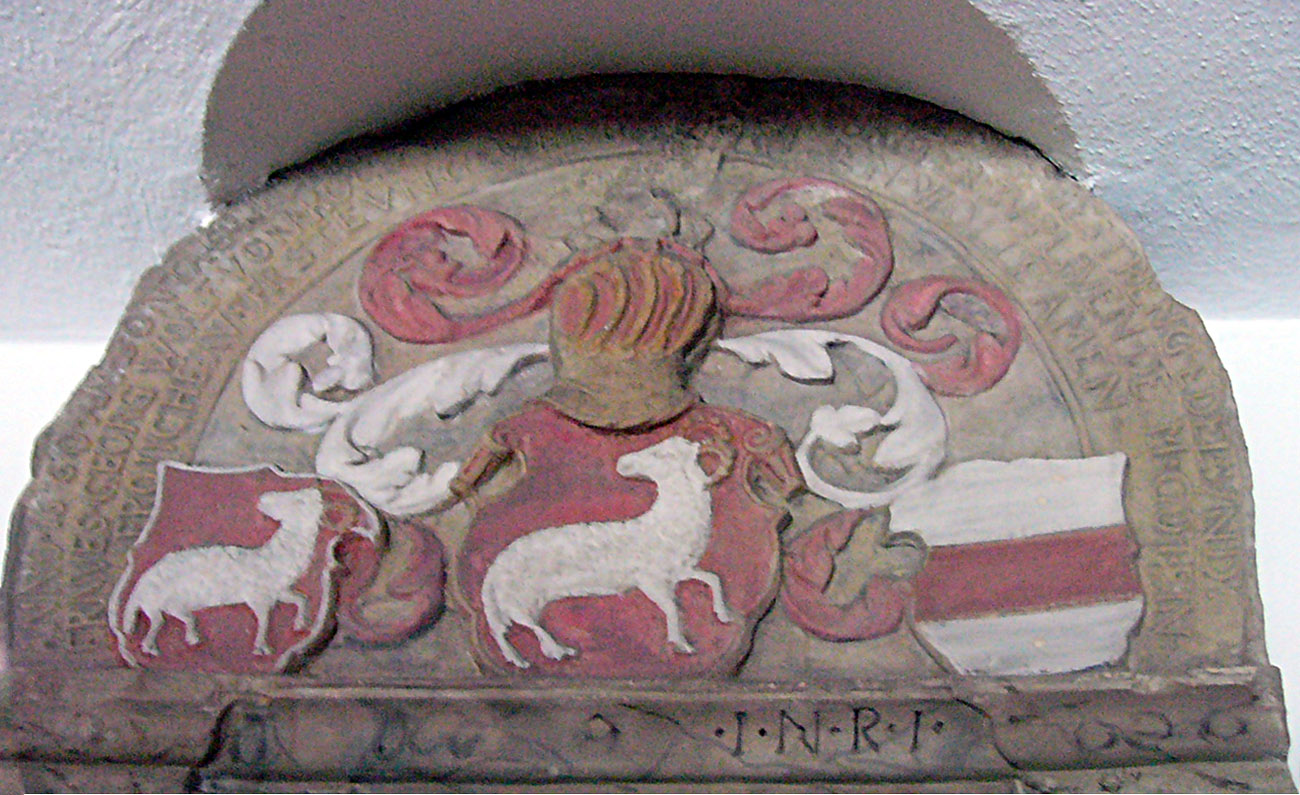
Detail of his grave

George Wolf died in 1560 and was buried in the St. James Church (St. Jakobs Kirche) in Oberkotzau. His painted tomb shows the knight kneeling before the cross and several ancestral coats of arms as proof of ancestry.
