= Philip Kinsky of Wchinitz and Tettau =

Czech nobleman

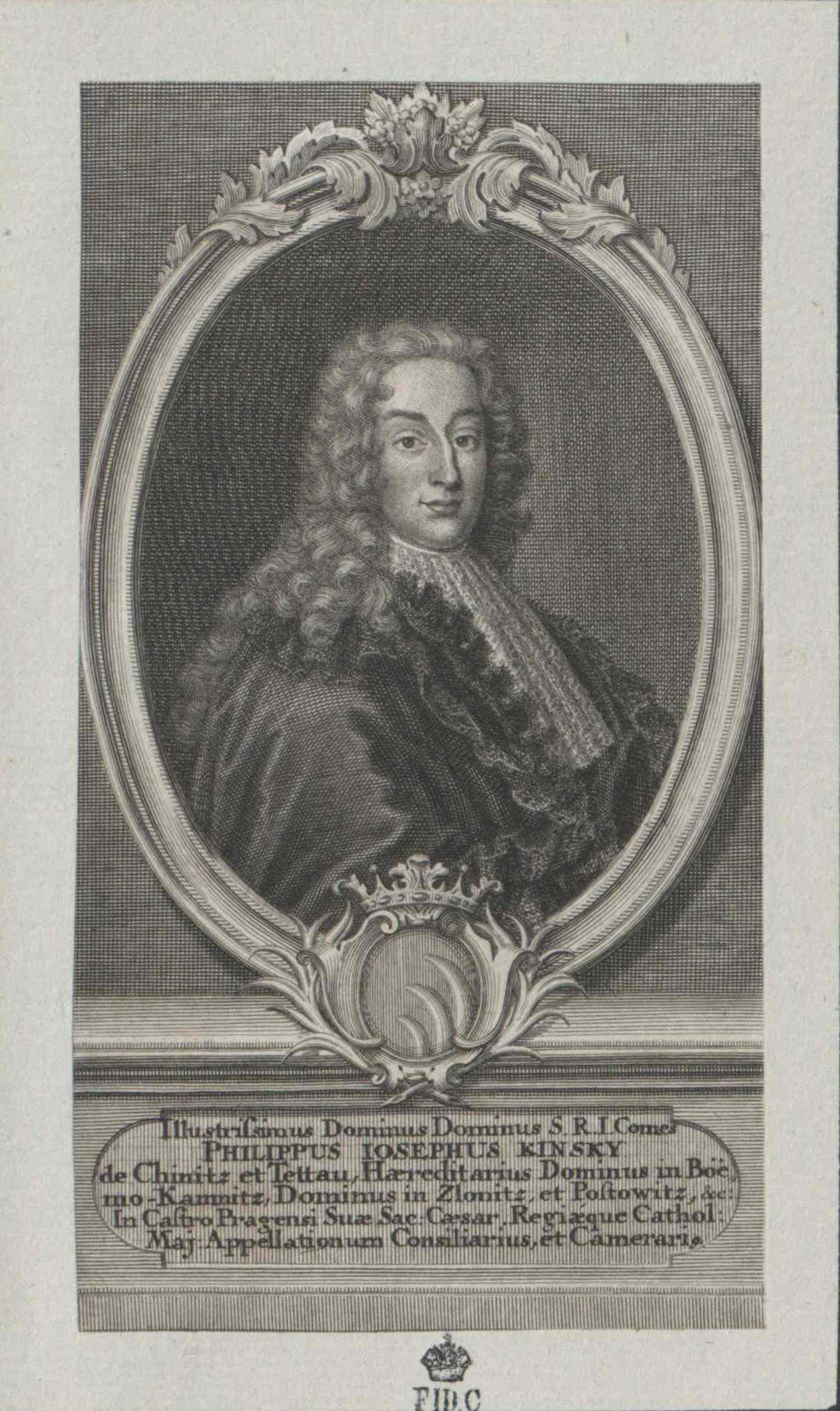
Count Philip Joseph Kinsky of Wchinitz and Tettau

Count Philip Joseph Kinsky of Wchinitz and Tettau (Czech: Filip Josef Kinský z Vchynic a Tetova; German: Philipp Joseph Graf Kinsky von Wchinitz und Tettau) (28 November 1700 – 12 January 1749) was High chancellor of the Kingdom of Bohemia during the reign of Queen Maria Theresa.

== Early life ==
Born in Prague as a member of the House of Kinsky, Philip was the son of Count Wenceslaus Kinsky von Wchinitz und Tettau (1642–1719), a Bohemian high chancellor, and his wife, Countess Maria Anna Theresia von Nesselrode-Ereshoven (1670–1716).

== Marriage and issue ==
On 17 November 1722, he married Countess Marie Karolína Bořitová z Martinic (1700-1785). They had eight children:

- Count Franz Karl (1722–1728)
- Count Karl Joseph (1723–1724)
- Countess Maria Josepha (1724–1754) married Count Michael Johann von Althann (1710–1778)
- Franz de Paula Ulrich, Prince Kinsky of Wchinitz and Tettau (1726–1792)
- Countess Maria Anna (1727–1733)
- Countess Maria Therese (1730–1797) married Count Otto-Philipp von Hohenfeld (1733–1799)
- Countess Maria Antonia (1732–1752) married firstly to Count Nikolaus Erdödy (1719–1757); married secondly to Count Kristóf Erdődy (1726–1777)
- Count Johann Joseph (1734–1790) married Princess Maria Theresia von Auersperg (1735–1800) and had issue.

== Career ==
Count Kinsky received a fine education and had many interests, such as improving education in Bohemia. He served Emperor Charles VI as an Imperial envoy in London between 1728 and 1736. He came into the cabinet of his successor, Queen Maria Theresa, in 1741, and soon became the Queen's trusted adviser and friend. Many feared him because of his temper. He was thought to be willful, but also stubborn and arrogant, which is why he wasn't very popular.

He was elected a Fellow of the Royal Society of London in 1731.

Diplomatic posts
Preceded by Carl Joseph von Palm	Habsburg Ambassador to the Court of St James; 1728–1736	Succeeded by Ignaz Johann von Wasner
