= 1561 celestial phenomenon over Nuremberg =

Supposed celestial phenomenon in the Holy Roman Empire

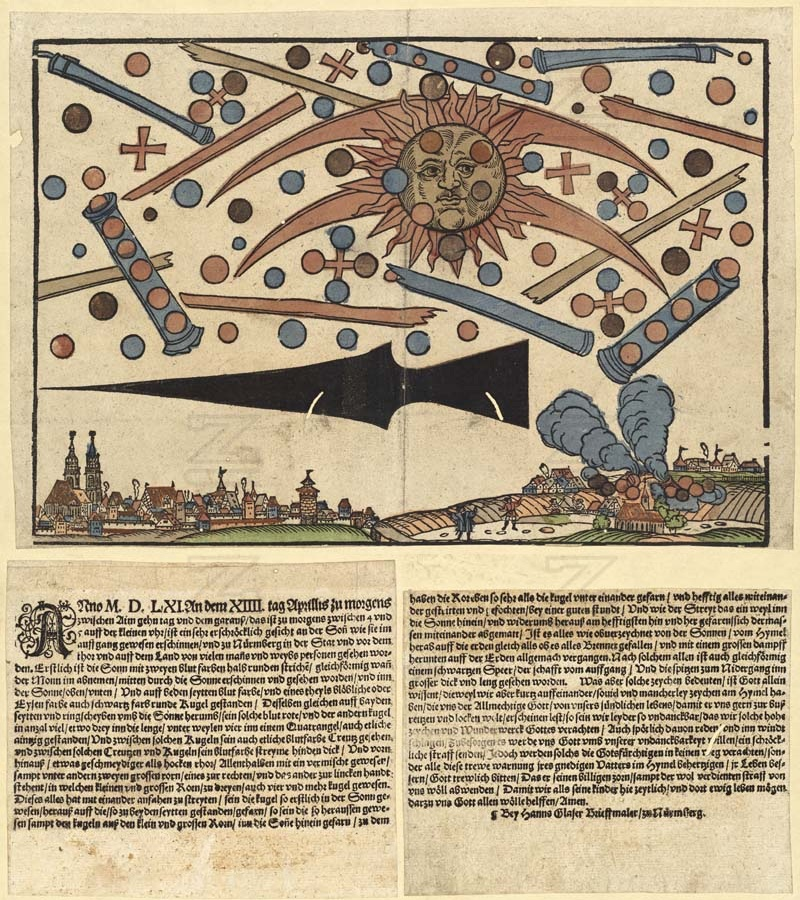
The celestial phenomenon over the German city of Nuremberg on April 14, 1561, as printed in an illustrated news notice in the same month

In April 1561, a broadsheet by Hans Glaser described a mass sighting of celestial phenomena or unidentified flying objects (UFO) above Nuremberg, then a Free Imperial City of the Holy Roman Empire. Ufologists have speculated that contemporary observers may have witnessed extraterrestrial spacecraft. Skeptics assert that the incident was likely to have been an atmospheric event, such as a sun dog.

== History ==
A broadsheet news article printed in April 1561 describes a mass sighting of celestial phenomena. The broadsheet, illustrated with a woodcut and text by Hans Glaser, measures 26.2 centimetres (10.3 in) by 38.0 centimetres (15.0 in). The document is archived in the prints and drawings collection at the Zentralbibliothek Zürich in Zürich, Switzerland.

According to the broadsheet, around dawn on 14 April 1561, "many men and women" of Nuremberg saw what the broadsheet describes as an aerial battle "out of the sun", followed by the appearance of a large black triangular object and exhausted combatant spheres falling to earth in clouds of smoke. The broadsheet claims that witnesses observed hundreds of spheres, cylinders, and other odd-shaped objects that moved erratically overhead. The woodcut illustration depicts objects of various shapes, including crosses (with or without spheres on the arms), small spheres, two large crescents, a black spear, and cylindrical objects from which several small spheres emerged and darted around the sky at dawn.

== The broadsheet text ==
The text of the broadsheet has been translated by Ilse Von Jacobi as follows:

In the morning of April 14, 1561, at daybreak, between 4 and 5 on the small clock (Note: The broadsheet gives the time twice: as "between ain gehn tag and the garauß", i.e. in the Nuremberg reckoning, in which day and night hours were counted separately beginning at about sunrise and sunset (Gerhard Dohrn-van Rossum: Die Geschichte der Stunde. Uhren und moderne Zeitordnungen. Hanser, Munich 1992, ISBN 3-446-16046-9, p. 112), and as "between 4 and 5 on the small clock" (auff der kleinen uhr), i.e. the ordinary count of twice twelve hours. Both refer to local time shortly before sunrise.), a dreadful apparition occurred on the sun, and then this was seen in Nuremberg in the city, before the gates and in the country – by many men and women. At first there appeared in the middle of the sun two blood-red semi-circular arcs, just like the moon in its last quarter. And in the sun, above and below and on both sides, the color was blood, there stood a round ball of partly dull, partly black ferrous color. Likewise there stood on both sides and as a torus about the sun such blood-red ones and other balls in large number, about three in a line and four in a square, also some alone. In between these globes there were visible a few blood-red crosses, between which there were blood-red strips, becoming thicker to the rear and in the front malleable like the rods of reed-grass, which were intermingled, among them two big rods, one on the right, the other to the left, and within the small and big rods there were three, also four and more globes. These all started to fight among themselves, so that the globes, which were first in the sun, flew out to the ones standing on both sides, thereafter, the globes standing outside the sun, in the small and large rods, flew into the sun. Besides the globes flew back and forth among themselves and fought vehemently with each other for over an hour. And when the conflict in and again out of the sun was most intense, they became fatigued to such an extent that they all, as said above, fell from the sun down upon the earth 'as if they all burned' and they then wasted away on the earth with immense smoke. After all this there was something like a black spear, very long and thick, sighted; the shaft pointed to the east, the point pointed west. Whatever such signs mean, God alone knows. Although we have seen, shortly one after another, many kinds of signs on the heaven, which are sent to us by the almighty God, to bring us to repentance, we still are, unfortunately, so ungrateful that we despise such high signs and miracles of God. Or we speak of them with ridicule and discard them to the wind, in order that God may send us a frightening punishment on account of our ungratefulness. After all, the God-fearing will by no means discard these signs, but will take it to heart as a warning of their merciful Father in heaven, will mend their lives and faithfully beg God, that He may avert His wrath, including the well-deserved punishment, on us, so that we may temporarily here and perpetually there, live as his children. For it, may God grant us his help, Amen. By Hanns Glaser, letter-painter of Nurnberg.

== Modern interpretations and historical context ==
=== Similar events and writings ===
- The Vädersol (sun dogs, literally "weather-sun") over Stockholm in 1535, as depicted in the Vädersolstavlan.
- Miracle sign above Waldeck Castle near Kemnath/Upper Palatinate, also by Hans Glaser from 1554.
- The Plech Sky Spectacular, also in Germany and also in 1554.
- The 1566 celestial phenomenon over Basel.
- The 1628 Meteorite in Hatford, Oxfordshire.
- The 1665 celestial phenomenon over Stralsund.
- The Miracle of the Sun in Fátima, Portugal in 1917.

=== Symbolism ===
According to author Jason Colavito, the woodcut broadsheet became known in modern culture outside of Germany after being published in Carl Jung's 1958 book Flying Saucers: A Modern Myth of Things Seen in the Skies, a book which analyzed the archetypal meanings of UFO sightings. Jung expressed a view that the spectacle was most likely a natural phenomenon interpreted from the perspective of religious and military imagery familiar to Europeans in the 16th century. Still, the purpose of Jung's analysis focused on the symbology of the broadsheet and only judged hypotheses as asides.

Expressing his view that the celestial sighting was likely not organic in origin, Jung stated, "If the UFOs were living organisms, one would think of a swarm of insects rising with the sun, not to fight one another but to mate and celebrate the marriage flight." Jung proposes that the images of four globes coupled by lines suggested crossed marriage quaternities and forms the model for "the primitive cross cousin marriage". There is no evidence that this symbol has ever been used in this manner, and Jung may have been invoking more modern genealogical charts as used in kinship anthropology. He also posited that the woodcut may include an individuation symbol and that the association of sunrise suggests "the revelation of the light." This is in line with other interpretations that the woodcut is highly stylized and intended to induce religious admonition in its viewers, not depict the event objectively.

=== Ufology ===
In ufology, the broadsheet is repeatedly cited as proof of UFO encounters and evidence of visits by extraterrestrials earlier in human history. Alleged descriptions of numerous witness accounts, interpreted as "violent appearances" and "fighting" are used as reasoning to suggest that UFOs engaged in conflict in the sky, in the literal sense.

Ufologist Jacques Vallée expresses skepticism over the Nuremberg celestial event and other celestial events in 16th century Europe. He reasons that the similarity between this event and other near-identical events implies that this may be a "stock myth" propagated and perhaps commissioned by religious authorities. Vallée interprets the admonitions and apocalyptic thinking in Glaser's prose as evidence that the broadsheet's purpose is that of propaganda.

=== Historiography ===
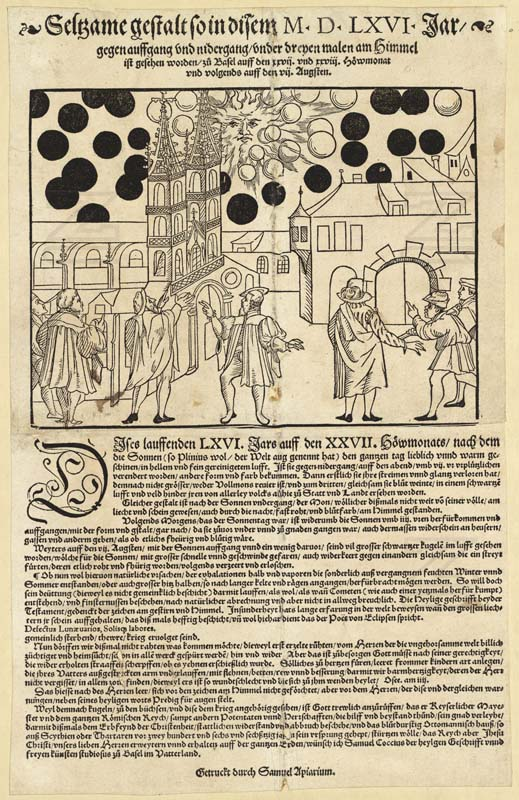
Woodcut art and broadsheet depicting 1566 celestial phenomenon over Basel

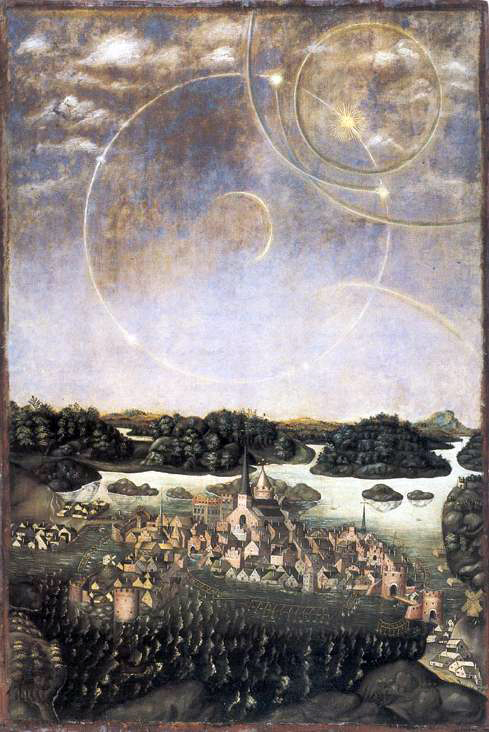
The Vädersolstavlan, depicting a 1535 sun dog over Stockholm

Stylized and figurative depictions of likely sun dogs from the 1500s. Despite clear differences in the purposes of these two works, both artists interpreted the events religiously.

Skeptic and historian Ulrich Magin questions the supposed purpose of the woodcut art as a valid and objective report of the celestial event. For example, there are multiple discrepancies in the artwork itself that Magin interprets as invalidating. Nuremberg Castle is not present in Glaser's woodcut, despite being the defining feature of Nuremberg at that time. The Church of St. Leonhard, Nuremberg is present in the woodcut, despite the fact that the church was burnt down at the time of the celestial sighting.

Magin and other skeptics, such as Wiebke Schwarte, conclude that the purpose of the text was that of popular religiously-themed reading material, more akin to tabloids than to a truthful record of the event. At a time when Nuremberg's literacy rate is estimated to be 30% in males and nearly zero in females, readers at this time may have even been aware that they were not meant to consider the validity of the broadsheet.

Sun dogs and related phenomena had been known since antiquity and painted with geometric accuracy in Europe before Hans Glaser's broadsheet, such as in the famous Swedish painting Vädersolstavlan. This stands in stark contrast to the woodcuts and underscores the purpose of Glaser's abstract and mass-produced interpretation.

=== Modern Christian Interpretation ===
Similar to the celestial event above Nuremberg was the Miracle of the Sun in Portugal in 1917. Stanley L. Jaki was a priest and wrote about it (he did not witness the event himself). Jaki held a doctorate in theology as well as a doctorate in physics, where he detailed mathematical models of optical phenomena. Jaki published a markedly interdisciplinary and compromising view of the Miracle of the Sun that explains such phenomena meteorologically in a manner that does not contradict Catholic teachings.

...a sudden temperature inversion must have taken place. The cold and warm air masses could conceivably propel that rotating air lens in an elliptical orbit first toward the earth, and then push it up, as if it were a boomerang, back to its original position. Meanwhile, the ice crystals in it acted as so many means of refraction for the sun's rays... Only one observer, a lawyer, stated three decades later that the path of descent and ascent was elliptical with small circles superimposed on it. Such an observation would make eminent sense to anyone familiar with fluid dynamics or even with the workings of a boomerang. There is indeed plenty of scientific information on hand to approach the miracle of the sun scientifically... The carefully co-ordinated interplay of so many physical factors would by itself be a miracle, even if one does not wish to see anything more in what actually happened. Clearly, the "miracle" of the sun was not a mere meteorological phenomenon, however rare. Otherwise it would have been observed before and after, regardless of the presence of devout crowds or not. I merely claim, which I did in my other writings on miracles, that in producing miracles God often makes use of a natural substratum by greatly enhancing its physical components and their interactions.

— Stanley L. Jaki
