= Francis, Count of Kinsky of Wchinitz and Tettau =

Bohemian-Austrian diplomat and politician

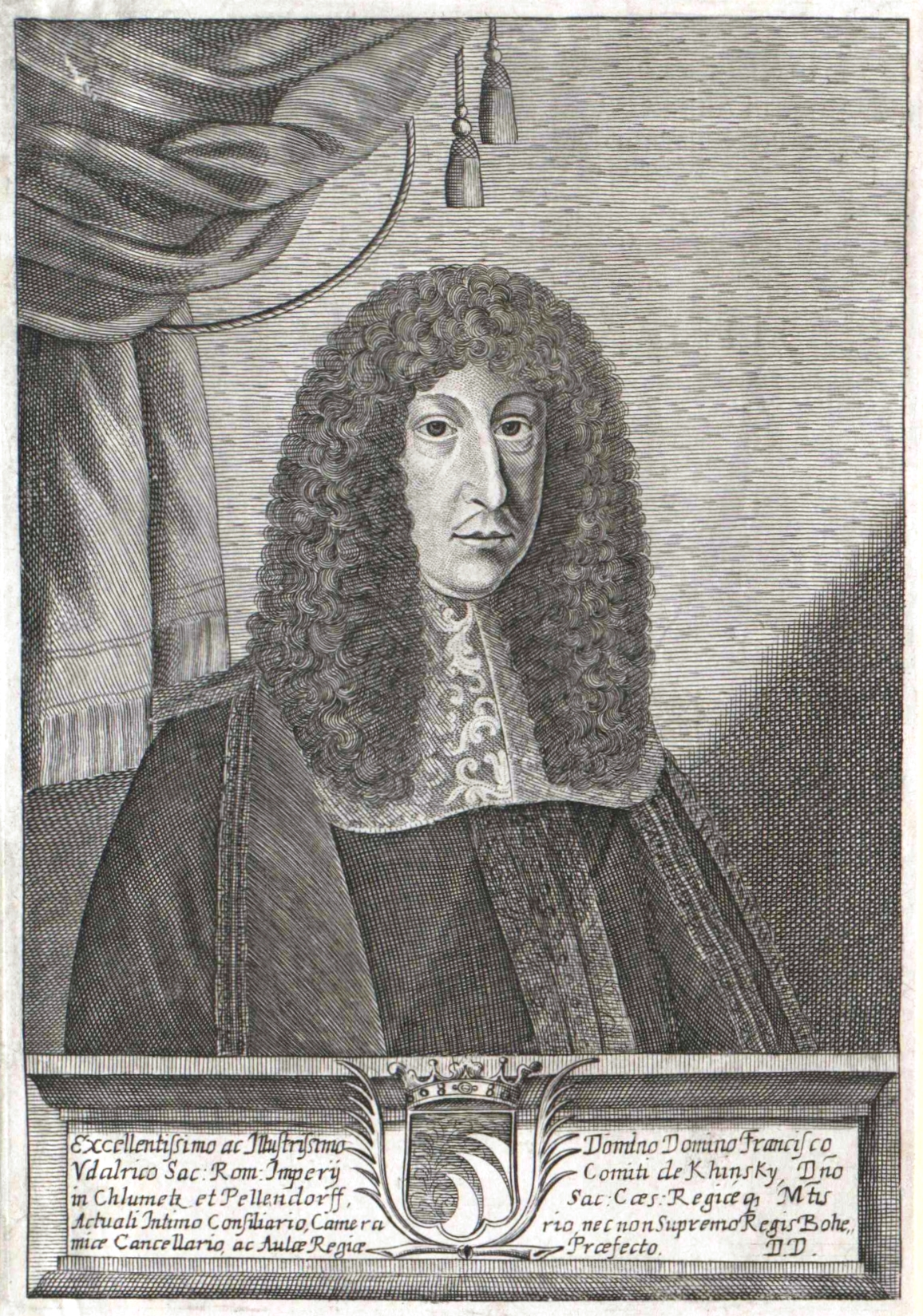
Franz Ulrich Kinsky

Franz Ulrich Count Kinsky von Wchinitz (Chlumec nad Cidlinou, 1634 – Vienna, 27 February 1699) was a Bohemian-Austrian diplomat and politician.

== Biography ==
Franz Ulrich Kinsky came from the old Bohemian noble family of Kinsky. His younger brother was Wenceslaus Norbert, Count of Kinsky. In 1683, he became the High Chancellor of Bohemia and in 1689 a member of the Secret Conference. From 1695 he was the leading statesman at the Viennese court. In the peace negotiations with the Ottoman Empire, he advocated a hard policy aimed at expansion.

His parents were the Bohemian court master and chancellor of the Kingdom of Bohemia, Count Johann Octavian von Kinsky (1612–1679) and his wife, Countess Margaretha Magdalena Sforzia von Porzia. He married Anna Franziska von Ursenbeck (died 19 January 1708), daughter of Franz Bernhard von Ursenbeck. The marriage remained childless.

== Sources ==
- Constantin von Wurzbach: "Kinsky von Wchinitz und Tettau, Franz Ulrich (I.) Graf." In: Biographisches Lexikon des Kaiserthums Oesterreich (Biographical Lexicon of the Empire of Austria). Part 11 Kaiserlich-königliche Hof- und Staatsdruckerei, Vienna 1864, p. 280 (digitalised).
- ADB:Kinsky, Franz Ulrich Graf
- Klaus Müller (1977). "Kinsky, Franz Ulrich Graf". Neue Deutsche Biographie (in German). Vol. 11. Berlin: Duncker & Humblot. pp. 627–628. (full text online).
