= 1665 celestial phenomenon over Stralsund =

Aerial phenomenon reported in Stralsund, Germany

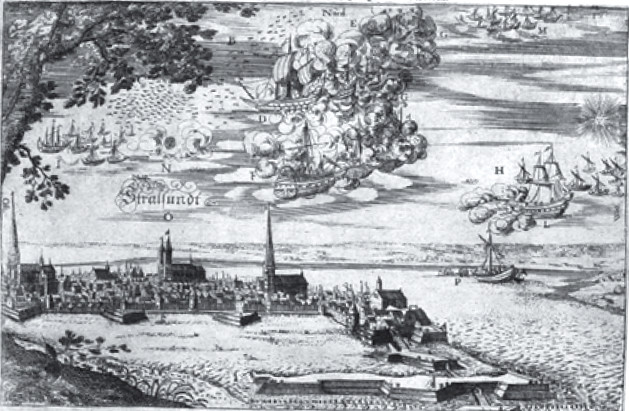
1665 engraving of the phenomenon

The 1665 celestial phenomenon over Stralsund refers to reports from Stralsund, Swedish Pomerania (now Germany), of unusual flying ships allegedly seen over the city, now sometimes considered unidentified flying objects (UFOs) in a modern context. These ships were described as being dark grey or having a color resembling "that of the rising Moon". In addition, they were at times described as being covered by a dome like that of a hat, as well as being saucer-shaped like a plate. The purported phenomena were claimed to have been seen frequently flying over St. Nicholas Church near the Baltic Sea, where they would hover until the evening.

Some reports described ships of various sizes battling each other in the sky over the Baltic Sea, which was viewed as an omen from God.

== See also ==
- 1561 celestial phenomenon over Nuremberg
- 1566 celestial phenomenon over Basel
