= Hans Glaser =

German printer and print maker

- Born: c. 1500
- Died: June 1573
- Known for: Print making, wood cutting

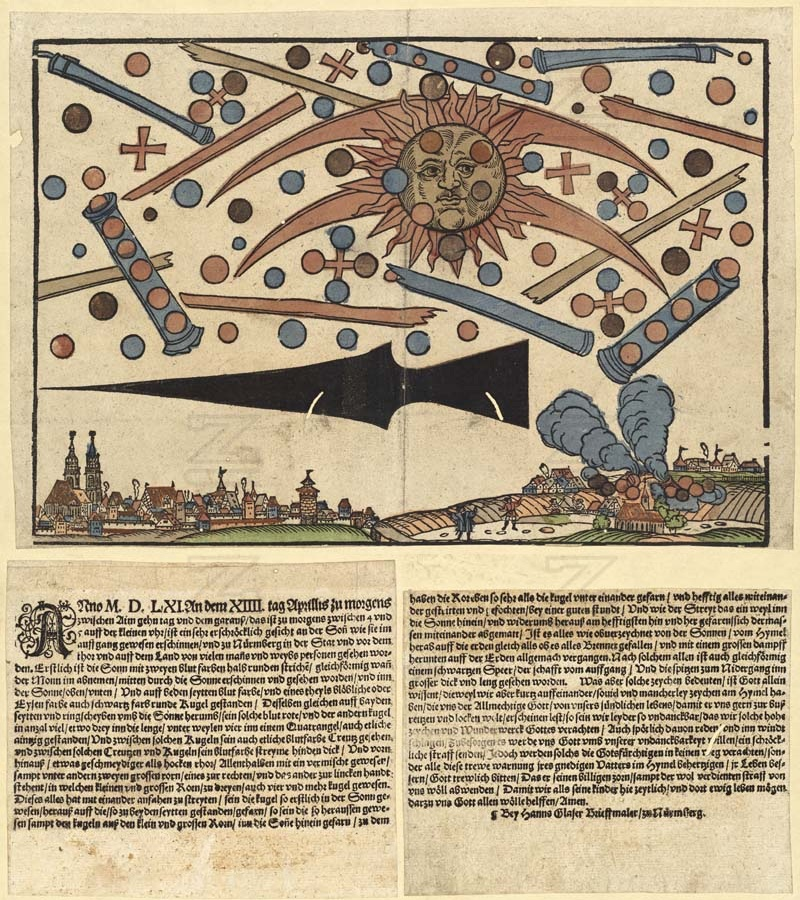
14 April 1561 broadsheet by Hans Glaser, with a woodcut illustration and accompanying text describing a celestial event that occurred over Nuremberg on 4 April that year.

Hans Wolff Glaser (also Hanns Glaser, Hans Glasser, Hans Wolff Glaßer; c. 1500 – June 1573) was a printer, block-cutter, woodcut tinter and publisher from Nuremberg in the Holy Roman Empire, known for printing broadsheets, some featuring woodcut illustrations. Glaser produced prints between 1540 and 1572.

== Life ==
Hans Glaser also referred to himself as a wood cutter, letter painter and letter printer and is listed as such from 1538 in the office books of the city of Nuremberg. Until 1553 he lived in Nuremberg in what he referred to himself as the "Schmelzhütten", after which Glaser had his workshop in the immediate vicinity of the parish church of St. Lorenz.

Glaser is most-known for printing a broadsheet news article on 14 April 1561 describing a mass sighting of a celestial event or unidentified flying objects that occurred over Nuremberg on 4 April the same year. The broadsheet, illustrated with a woodcut and text, is preserved at the Zentralbibliothek Zürich in Zurich, Switzerland. It describes objects of various shapes including crosses, spears, discs, a crescent, and a tubular object from which several smaller, round objects emerged and darted around the sky at dawn. Among ufologists Glaser's picture report is interpreted as a UFO landing or even as a witness protocol of a spaceship battle over Nuremberg. However, some claim that the two cylindrical objects running diagonally downward resemble the phenomenon of the parhelion and the further lines similar halo effects. However, the engraving does not fit the usual classic description of a sun dog: "a bright spot sometimes appearing at either side of the sun, often on a luminous ring or halo, caused by the refraction and reflection of sunlight by ice crystals suspended in the earth's atmosphere". Numerous simpler depictions of such atmospheric reflections are known from the 16th and 17th centuries.

Glaser was married, and after 1575 his widow married Wolf Drechsel, a former apprentice of her husband, who continued Glaser's workshop and continued to use his printing blocks.

== Gallery ==
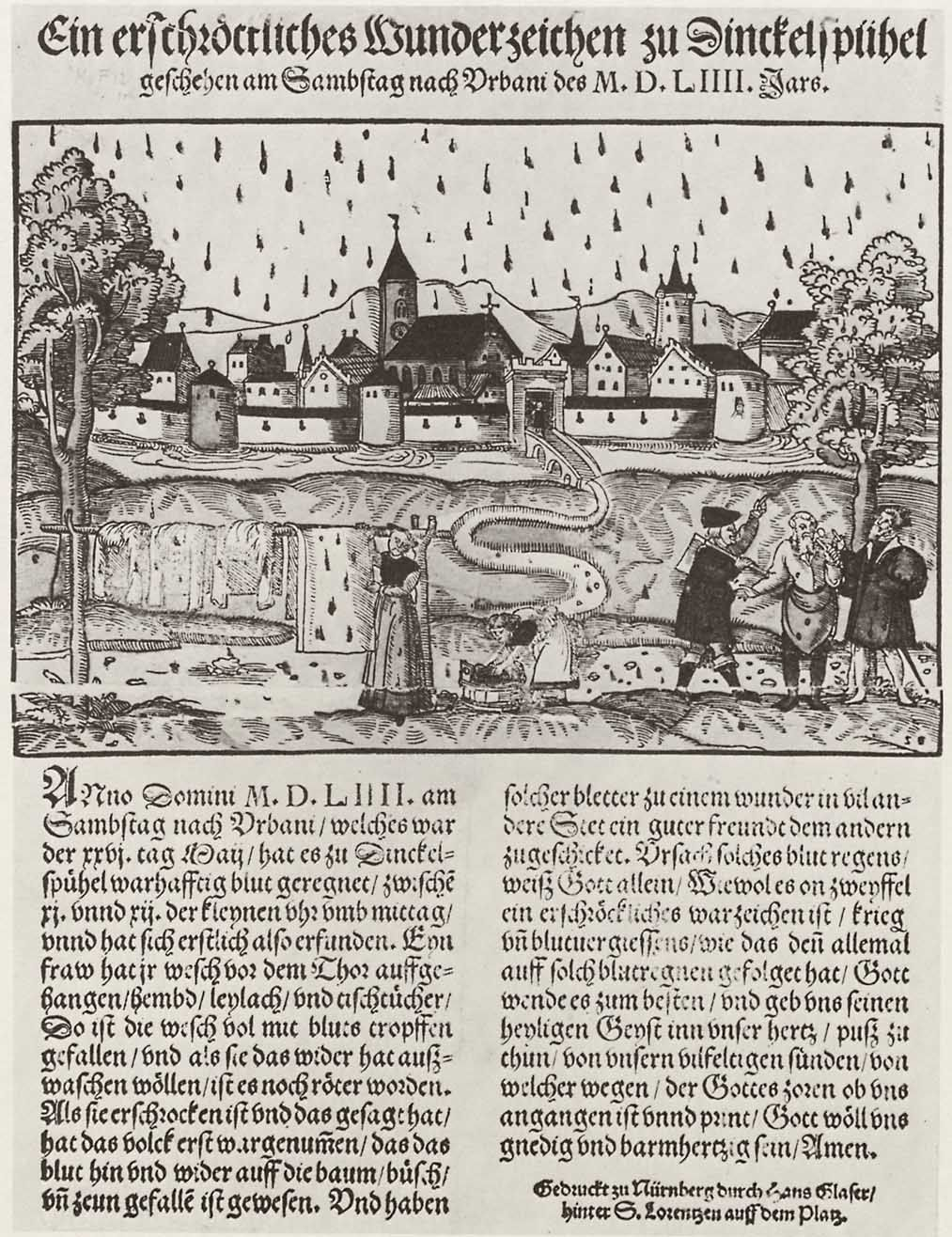
Blood rain over Dinkelsbühl on 26 May 1554

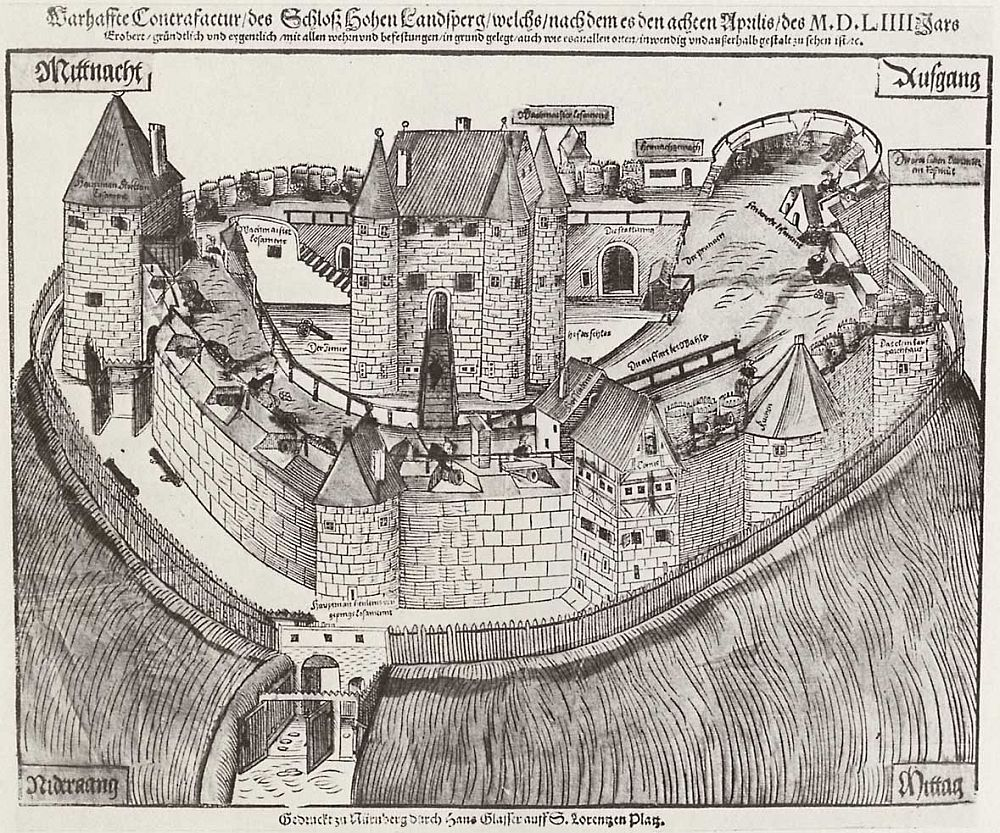
Castle of Hohenlandsberg before its demolition in 1554

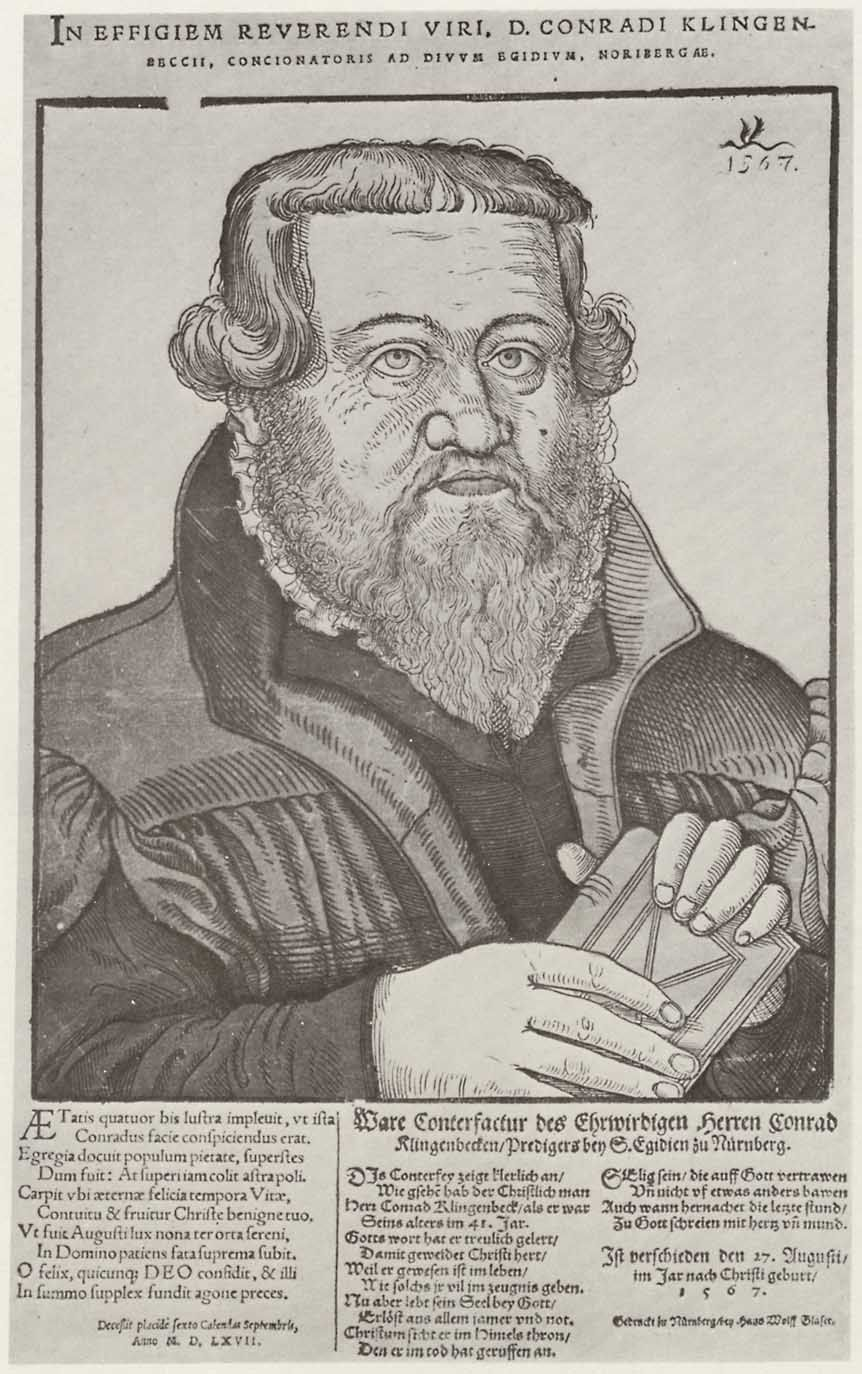
German theologian Conrad Klingenbeck

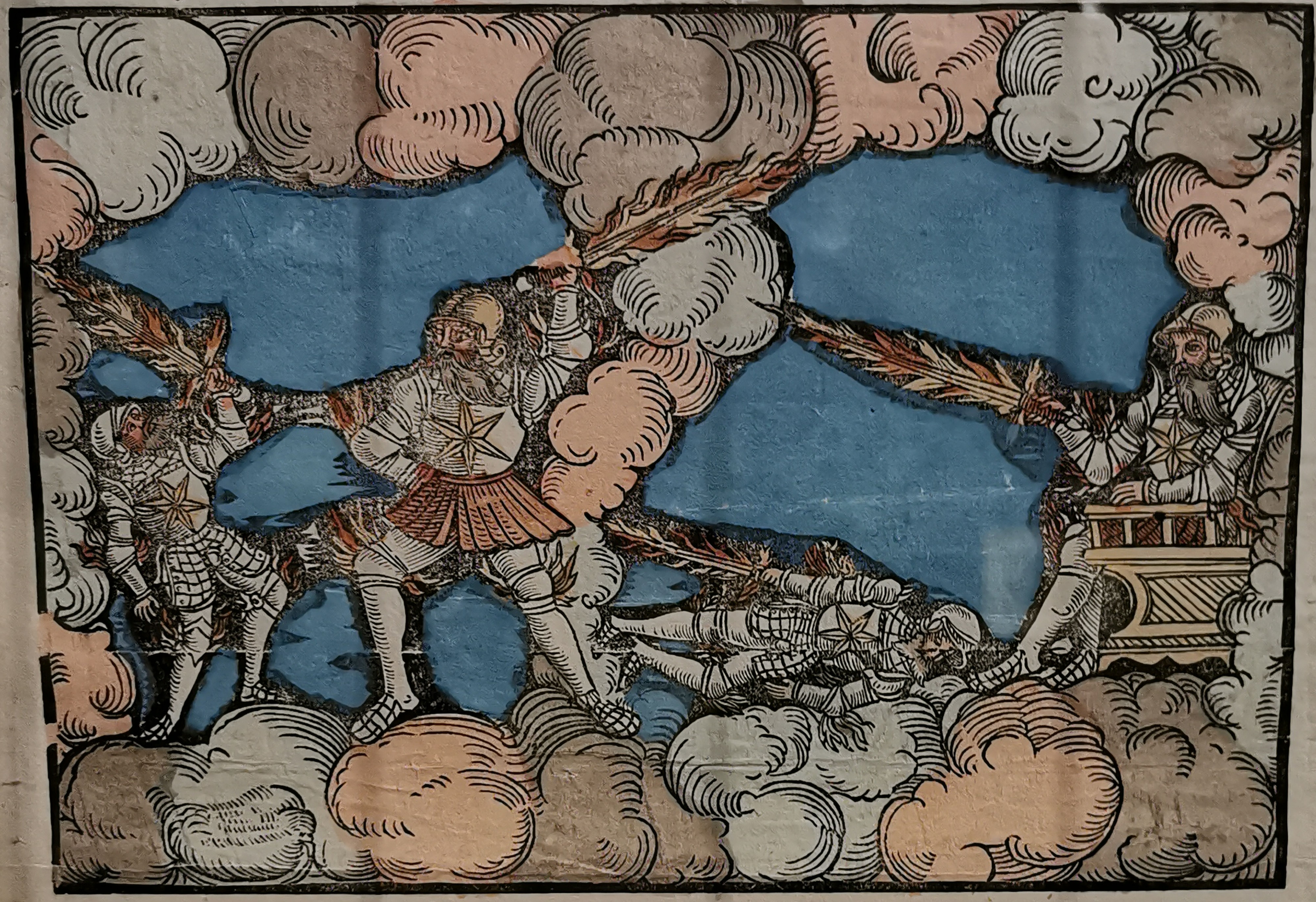
Knights fighting on the clouds on 24 July 1554
