= House of Schwarzenberg =

German and Czech noble family

- Coat of Arms
- Parent house: Seinsheim
- Country: Holy Roman Empire; Old Swiss Confederacy; Kingdom of Bohemia; Duchy of Styria; Archduchy of Austria; German Confederation; Austrian Empire; Austria-Hungary
- Origin: Duchy of Franconia
- Founded: 917 Seinsheim (parent house); 1421 Acquisition of Schwarzenberg
- Founder: Erkinger VI of Seinsheim aka Erkinger I of Schwarzenberg
- Current head: HSH Prince Johannes Nepomuk of Schwarzenberg
- Final ruler: Joseph II, 6th Prince of Schwarzenberg
- Titles: Prince and Lord of Schwarzenberg; Duke of Krumlov; Landgrave of Klettgau; Count of Sulz; Lord of Wittingau; Lord of Frauenberg; Lord of Postelberg; Lord of Lobositz; Lord of Kornhaus; Lord of Neuschloss; Lord of Drahonitz; Lord of Protivin; Lord of Netolitz; Lord of Worlik; Lord of Winterberg; Lord of Chegnov; Lord of Murau; Lord of Reifenstein; Lord of Frauenburg
- Style: Serene Highness
- Motto: NIL NISI RECTUM (NOTHING BUT THE RIGHT)
- Estates: Princely County of Schwarzenberg; Princely Landgraviate of Klettgau; County of Gimborn
- Deposition: 1806: Dissolution of the Holy Roman Empire
- Cadet branches: Princely Line; Frisian Line; Prussian Line

The House of Schwarzenberg (German pronunciation: [ˈʃvaʁtsn̩ˌbɛʁk]) is a German (Franconian) and Czech (Bohemian) aristocratic family, formerly one of the most prominent European noble houses. The Schwarzenbergs are members of the German and Czech nobility, and they once held the rank of Princes of the Holy Roman Empire. The family belongs to the high nobility and traces its roots to the Lords of Seinsheim during the Middle Ages.

The current head of the family is Prince Johannes (born 1967), son and heir of the late Karel, 12th Prince of Schwarzenberg (1937–2023), a Czech politician who served as Minister of Foreign Affairs of the Czech Republic. The family owns properties and lands across Austria, the Czech Republic, Germany, and Switzerland.

== History ==
=== Origin ===
The family stems from the Lords of Seinsheim, who had established themselves in Franconia during the Middle Ages. A branch of the Seinsheim family (the non-Schwarzenberg portion died out in 1958) was created when Erkinger of Seinsheim acquired the Franconian territory of Schwarzenberg and the castle of Schwarzenberg in Scheinfeld during the early part of the 15th century. He was then granted the title of Freiherr (Baron) of Schwarzenberg in 1429. At that time, the family also possessed some fiefdoms in Bohemia.

=== Ascent and expansion ===
In 1599, the Schwarzenbergs were elevated to Imperial Counts, and the family was later raised to princely status in 1670. In 1623 came the Styrian Dominion of Murau into the Schwarzenberg family due to the marriage of Count Georg Ludwig of Schwarzenberg (1586–1646) with Anna Neumann von Wasserleonburg (1535–1623). Furthermore, the House of Schwarzenberg acquired extensive land holdings in Bohemia in 1661 through a marriage alliance with the House of Eggenberg. In the 1670s, the Schwarzenbergs established their primary seat in Bohemia and, until 1918, their main residence was in Český Krumlov, Bohemia (now in Czech Republic).

=== Schwarzenberg/Sulz family unification ===
Due to the absence of a male heir and his only daughter Maria Anna married to Prince Ferdinand of Schwarzenberg, Johann Ludwig II Count of Sulz proposed a family unification between the Counts of Sulz and Princes of Schwarzenberg at the Imperial Court. His request was granted, which not only transferred all legal and property rights upon his death in 1687 from the Sulz family to the Schwarzenberg family, but assured that the Sulz family continues in the Schwarzenberg family. The visible affirmation of this bond was the merging of the coat of arms.

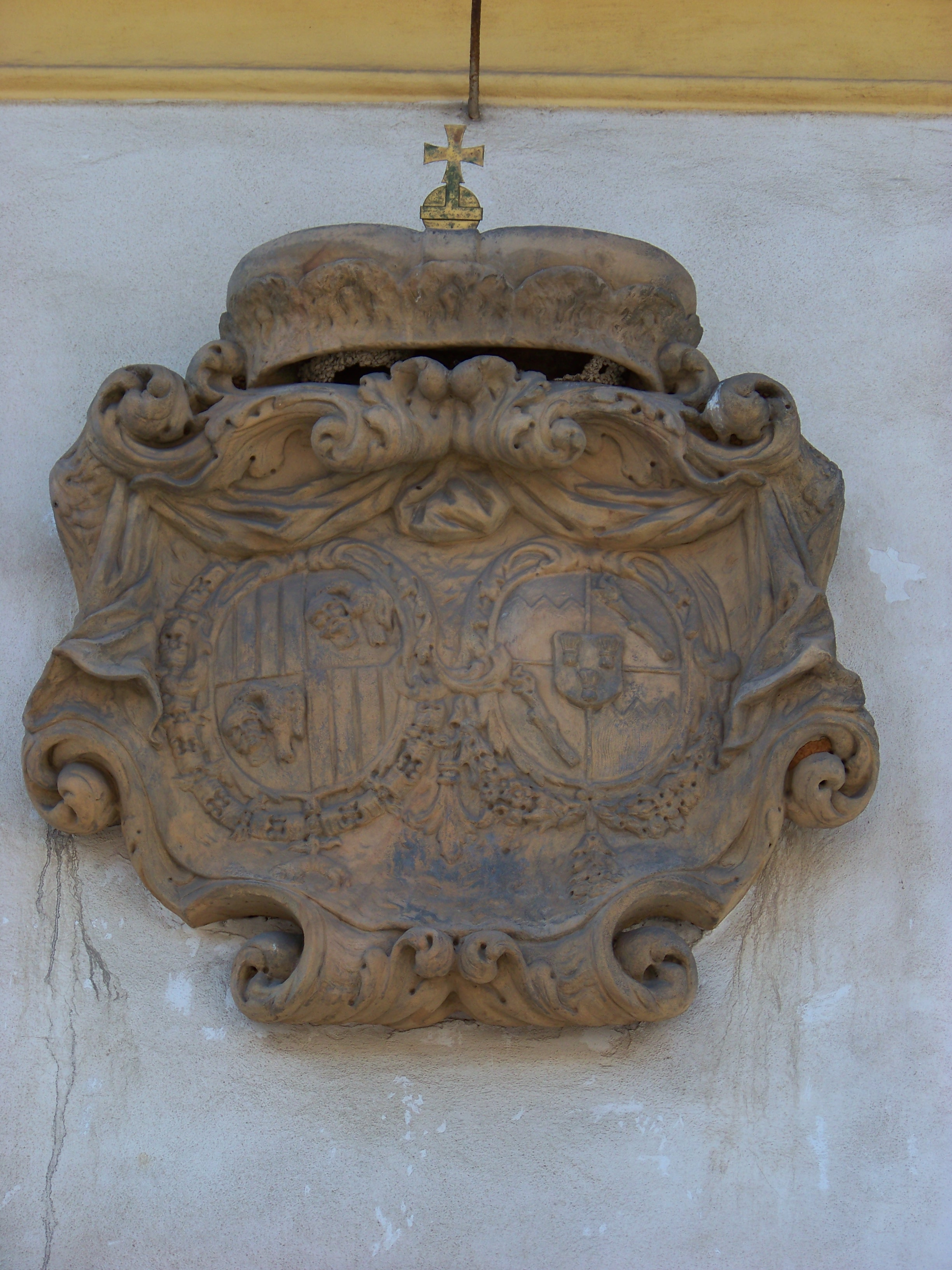
Alliance coat of arms on Jinonice castle

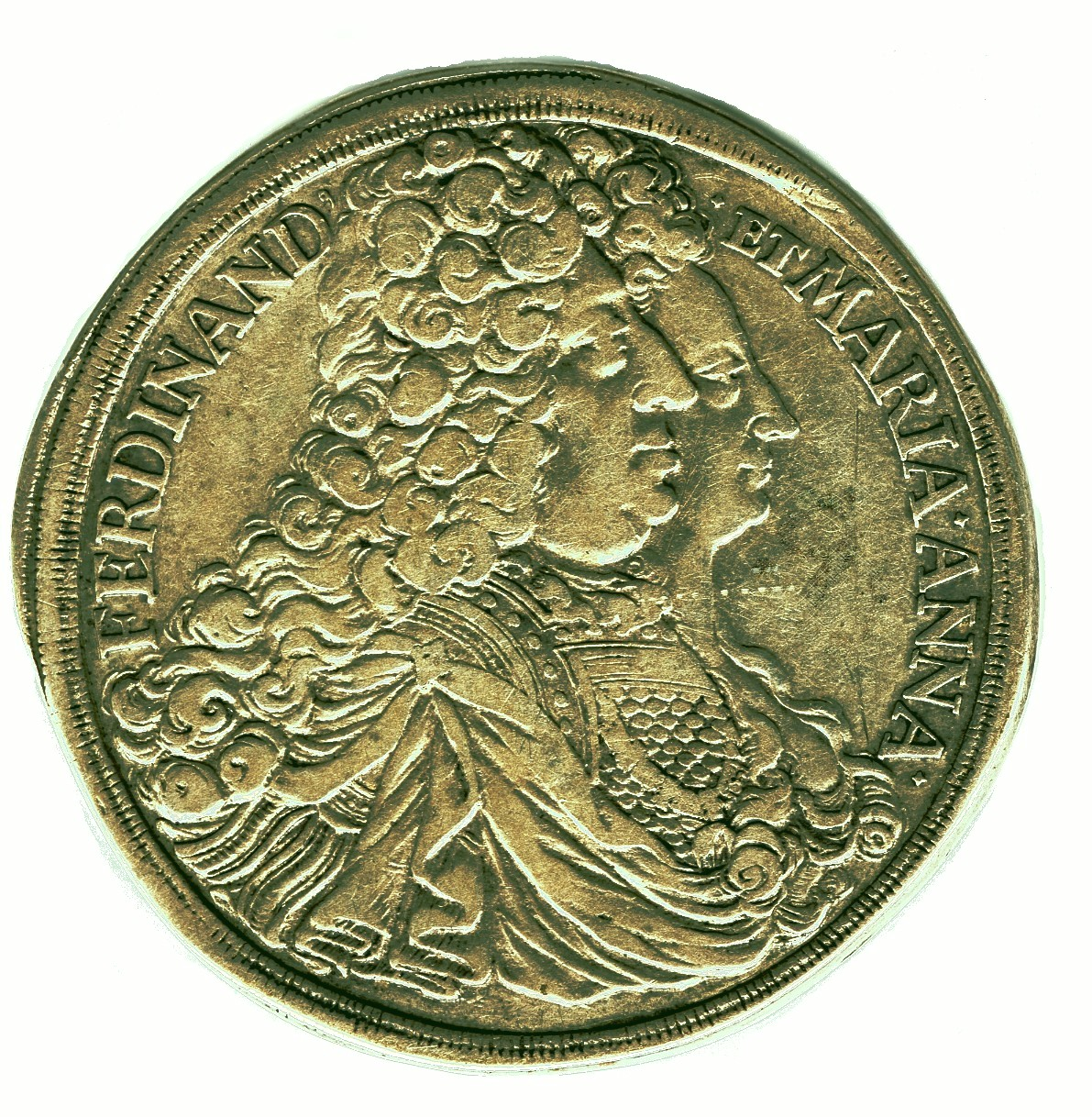
Ferdinand & Maria Anna

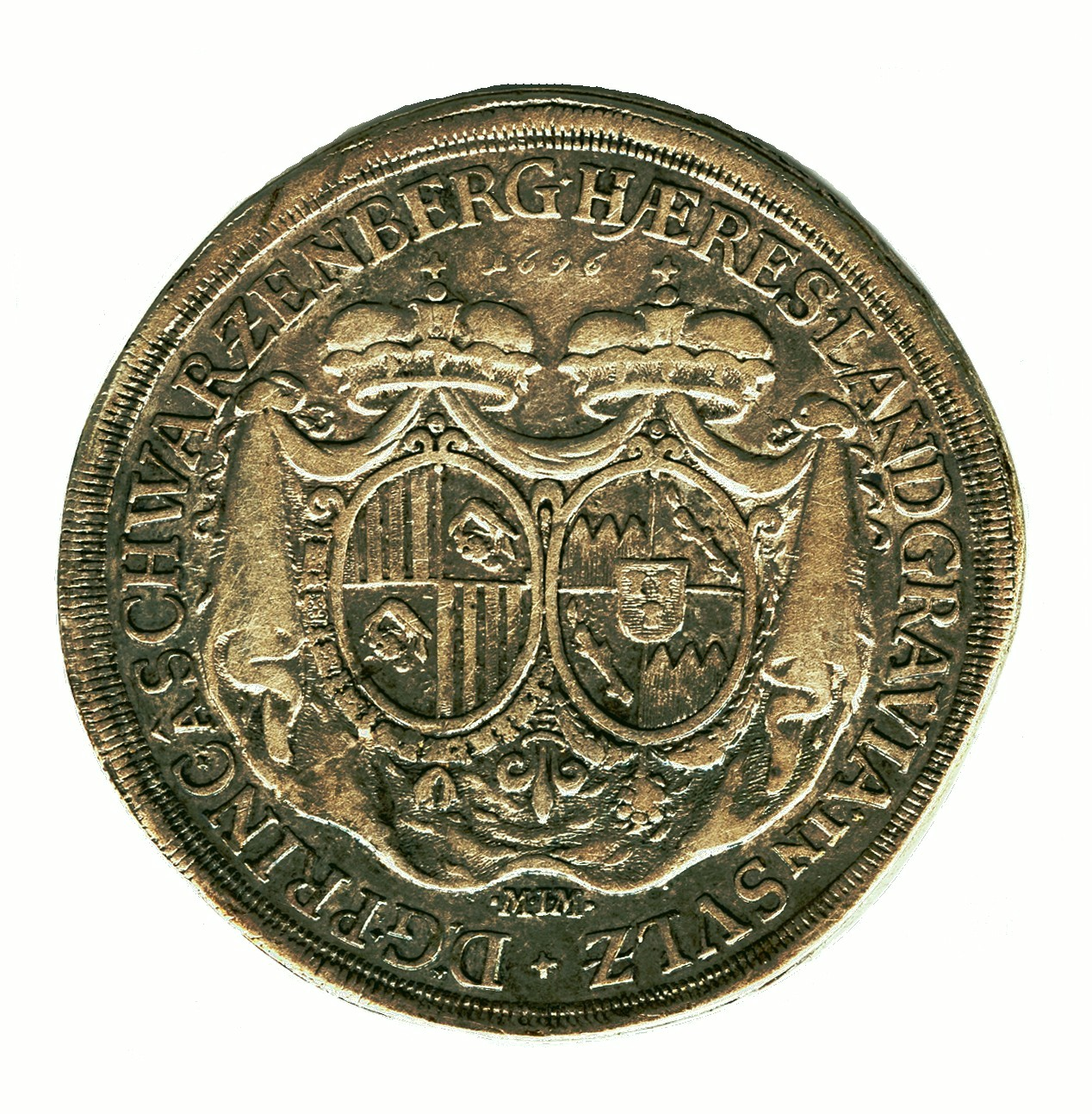
Alliance coat of arms on Schwarzenberg Ducat, which was the own currency issued by the House of Schwarzenberg

=== Two princely lines ===
At the beginning of the 19th century, the House of Schwarzenberg was divided into two princely-titled lines (majorats). This division was already foreseen in the will of Prince Ferdinand (1652-1703). However, the absence of two male heirs until Joseph II and Karl I Philipp inhibited the execution. The senior branch, which held not only the Palais Schwarzenberg in Vienna, but also the Dominions of Scheinfeld, Krumlov, Frauenberg and Murau, died out in the male line in 1979 upon the death of Joseph III of Schwarzenberg, who was the 11th Prince of Schwarzenberg. The cadet branch, which was established by Karl Philipp, Prince of Schwarzenberg at Orlík Castle, continues to the present day.

The two branches have now been re-united under the father of the current head of the family, Karl VII of Schwarzenberg, who was the 12th Prince of Schwarzenberg. He was a Czech politician and served as Minister of Foreign Affairs of the Czech Republic.

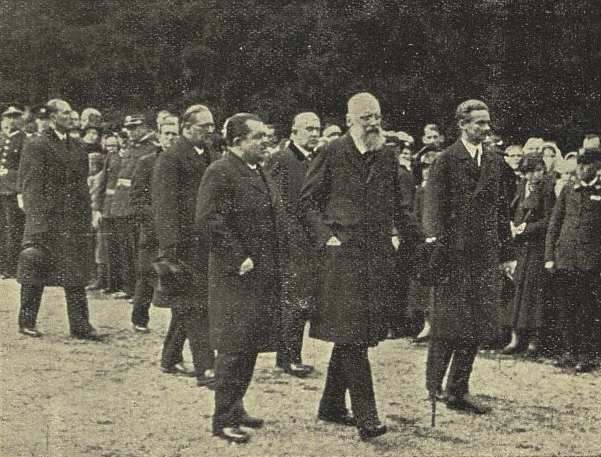
The three last Princes of the primogeniture: Adolf (l.), Johann II (m.) and Josef III (r.)

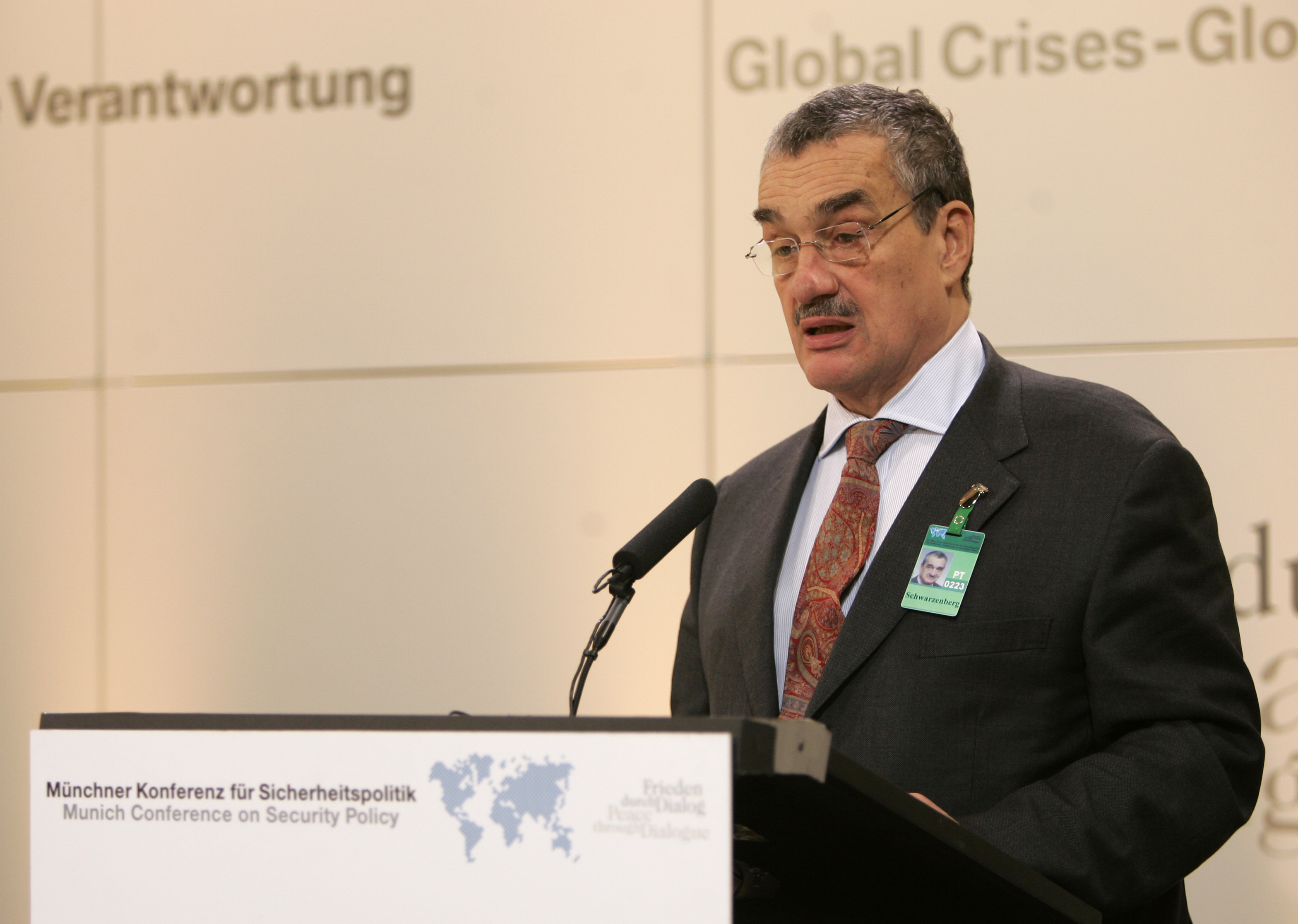
The heir of both lines: Karl VII/I

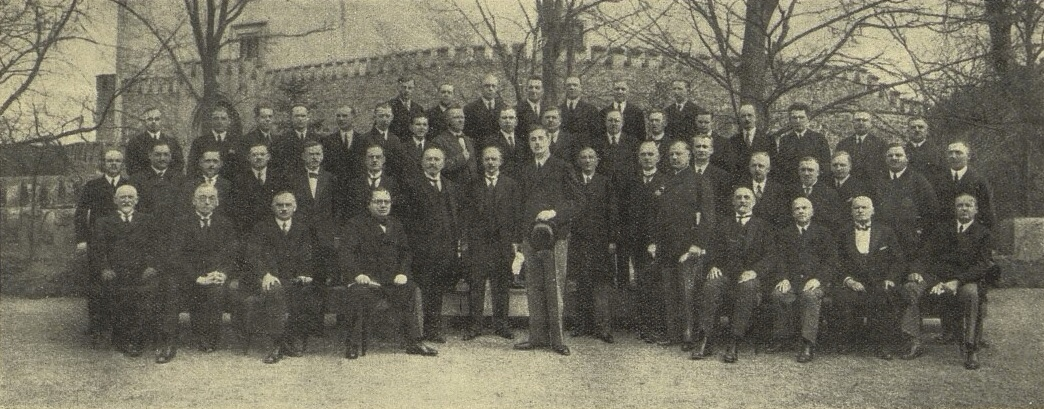
The last Prince of the secundogeniture: Karl VI (m.)

=== Present time ===
Due to the unification of the family-headship under Karl VII Schwarzenberg, the fidei commissa of both the primogeniture / Hluboka line and the secundogeniture / Orlik line came under the single ownership of the last-mentioned prince. Karl VII created in the 1980s the current structure of the family belongings. The German and Austrian properties from the primogeniture were embedded (with some exceptions) into the Fürstlich Schwarzenberg'sche Familienstiftung (Princely Schwarzenberg Family-Foundation) based in Vaduz. The art collection, which includes the painting The Abduction of Ganymede by Peter Paul Rubens or an important collection of works by Johann Georg de Hamilton, is held in the separate Fürstlich Schwarzenberg'sche Kunststiftung (Princely Schwarzenberg Art-Foundation). The Czech property of the secundogeniture was held until 2023 privately. These properties were in their vast majority also transferred into the Fürstlich Schwarzenberg'sche Familienstiftung. The members of the family follow careers in the private or military sector.

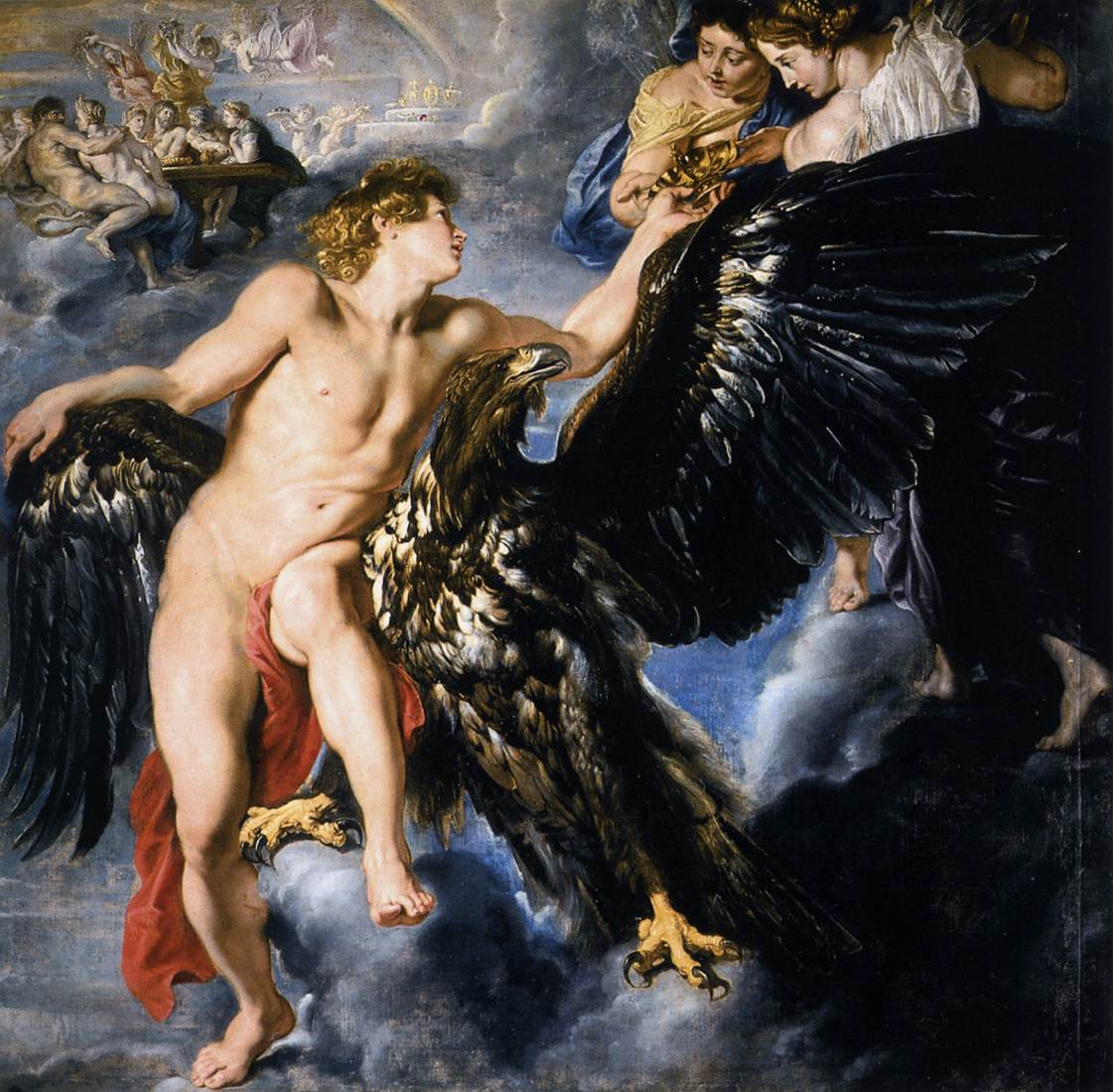
RUBENS: The Abduction of Ganymede (between 1611 and 1612)

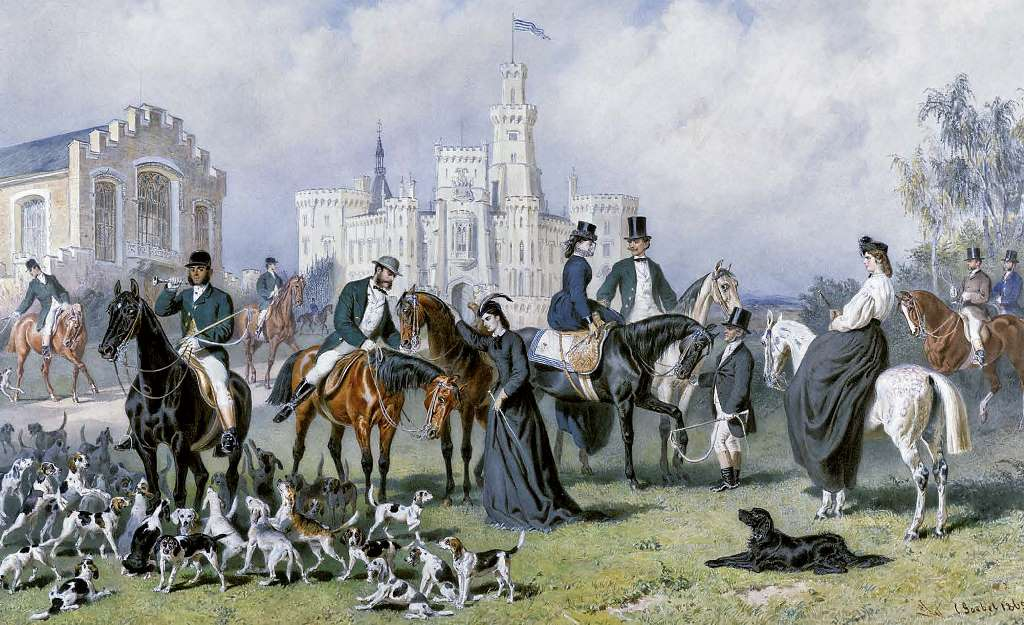
Hunting scene with the Princely family in front of Hluboká Castle in 1865

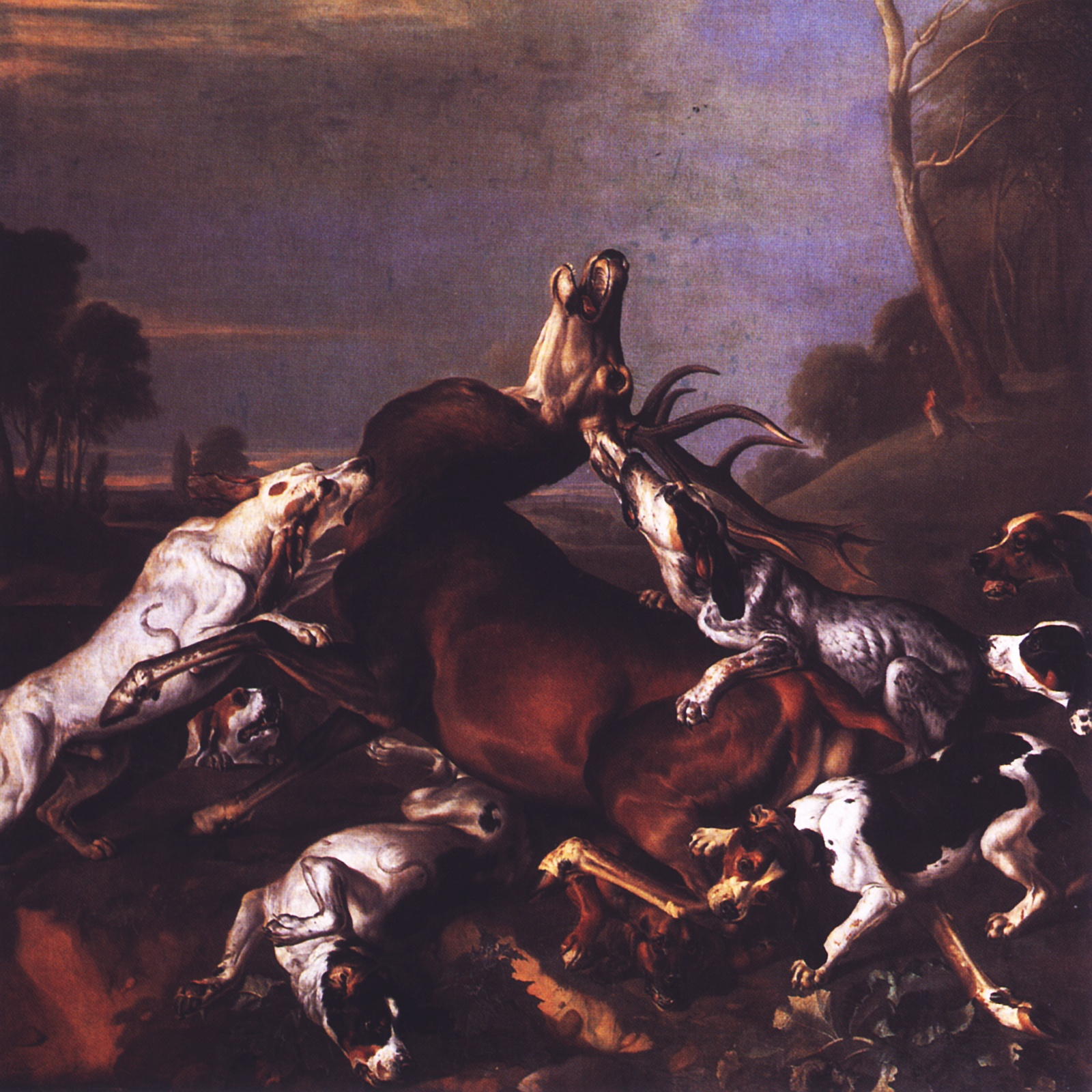
HAMILTON: Hirschhetze (1710)

=== Frisian and Prussian line ===
Michael II Baron zu Schwarzenberg (†1469), oldest son of Erkinger I (1362–1437), was married twice. First with Gertrud (Bätze) von Cronberg (†1438), from whom the princely line descends. His second marriage was with Ursula (Frankengrüner) Grüner (†~1484), from whom the Frisian and later the Prussian line originates. The children of Michael's and Ursula's alliance were never recognized by their half-siblings, as their first born son was born out of wedlock and the legitimisation only took place with the subsequent wedding.

Johann Onuphrius (1513–1584), a great-grandson of Michael II and Ursula, is considered to be the progenitor of the Frisian Line. His marriage with Maria von Grumbach (†1564) ensured Groot Terhorne Castle until 1879 as the family seat in the Netherlands. The Frisian line was made a member of the Dutch nobility by a Royal decree of King William I of the Netherlands on August 28, 1814. Henceforth, the Dutch version thoe Schwartzenberg en Hohenlansberg was applied for this branch of the family.

The Prussian Line was established as a cadet branch of the Frisian line with Georg Baron thoe Schwartzenberg en Hohenlansberg (1842–1918), who served as a Rittmeister in the Imperial German Army. He and his descendants were made members of the Prussian nobility by an Imperial decree, issued by Emperor Wilhelm II, and are entitled to carry the German title Freiherr.

== Imperial immediate estates ==
The Schwarzenberg family held three Imperial Immediate Estates in the Holy Roman Empire.

Name	Timespan	Map	Coat of Arms	Historic Map
Princely County of Schwarzenberg Gefürstete Grafschaft Schwarzenberg	1429 - 1806: Acquired by the Lords of Seinsheim 1405 – 1421; Imperial immediacy 1429; Raised to Imperial County 1599; Raised to Princely County 14 July 1670; German Mediatisation 1806	Schwarzenberg (Germany)		(Princely) County of Schwarzenberg
Princely Landgraviate of Klettgau Gefürstete Landgrafschaft Klettgau	1410 – 1806: Transition of the Landgraviate of Klettgau from the Habsburg family to the Sulz family 1410; Schwarzenberg / Sulz family unification 1687; Raised to Princely Landgraviate 1687; German Mediatisation 1806	Klettgau (Germany)		Princely Landgraviate of Klettgau
County of Gimborn Grafschaft Gimborn	1550 – 1782: Imperial immediacy 1631	Gimborn (Germany)		County of Gimborn

By coincidence the coat of arms of the Princely Landgraviate of Klettgau and the Earldom of Buchan in Scotland are the same. The Klettgau coat of arms can be found in the left heart shield of the Schwarzenberg coat of arms.

== Notable family members ==
The House of Schwarzenberg produced many military commanders, politicians, church dignitaries (including a Cardinal), innovators and patrons of the arts. They were related to a number of European aristocratic families, notably the Lobkowicz (Czech: Lobkovicové) family. Some of the most noteworthy members of the Schwarzenberg family are:

Name	Portrait	Arms	Office(s)	Marriage(s) Issue	Comments
Erkinger VI of Seinsheim, 1st Baron of Schwarzenberg; 1362 – 11 December 1437	Erkinger Schwarzenberg		Grand Master of the Hunt at the Court of the Bishopric of Würzburg	I. Anna von Bibra; 1348 – 1408; Six children II. Barbara von Abensberg; 1383 – 2 November 1448; Eleven children	Founder of the Schwarzenberg family Member of the Imperial Council Military commander in the Hussite Wars
Johann, Baron of Schwarzenberg; Johann the Strong; 25 December 1463 – 21 October 1528	Johann Schwarzenberg by Albrecht Duerer		Judge of the episcopal court at Bamberg	Kunigunde, Countess of Rieneck; 28 September 1469 – 18 October 1502 twelve children	Friend of Martin Luther, and author of the Constitutio Criminalis Bambergensis, which was the basis for the Constitutio Criminalis Carolina
Wilhelm I, Baron of Schwarzenberg; 1486 – KIA 1526			Field marshal	Katharina Wilhelmina von Nesselrode ? – 6 December 1567 two sons	Field marshal of the Holy Roman Empire under Emperor Charles V in: German Peasants' War; Guelders Wars
Otto Heinrich, Count of Schwarzenberg; Known among his contemporaries as inter viros sui temporis illustres illustrissimus 1535 – 11 August 1590			President of the Aulic Council; Hofmarschall of the HRR by his Imp. Maj. decreed Guardian and Governor in Baden	Elisa Margareta von Wolff Metternich ? – 6 February 1624 one son	Guardian and Governor in Baden for Margrave Philip II of Baden President of the Aulic Council and Hofmarschall of the HRR under Maximilian II and Rudolf II
Melchior, Baron of Schwarzenberg ca. 1536 – KIA 29 June 1579			Military Commander; Military Governor	Anne de Merode-Houffalize ca. 1530 – 1580	Commander of the Dutch States Party military forces in the Siege of Maastricht and Military Governor of Maastricht
Adolf, Count of Schwarzenberg ca. 1547 – 29 July 1600			Field marshal	Elisa Margareta von Wolff Metternich ? – 6 February 1624 one son	Field marshal of the Holy Roman Empire and liberator of Raab, Hungary
Adam, Count of Schwarzenberg; 1583 – 14 March 1641			Herrenmeister (Grand Master); Political advisor	Margareta, Freiin von Palant von Larochette und Moestroff ? – 29 September 1615 two sons	Advisor of George William, Elector of Brandenburg, Herrenmeister (Grand Master) of the Order of Saint John Son of Adolf, Count of Schwarzenberg
Georg Ludwig, Count of Schwarzenberg; 24 December 1586 – 22 July 1646			Statesman	I. Anna Neumann von Wasserleonburg; 25 November 1536 – 18 December 1623 no issue II. Maria Elisabeth Countess of Sulz; 1587 – 12 December 1651 two sons	Austrian statesman during the Thirty Years War Through his marriage with Anna Neumann came the Dominion of Murau into the Schwarzenberg family
Ferdinand, 2nd Prince of Schwarzenberg; The Plague King; 23 May 1652 – 22 October 1703			Oberhofmarschall; Oberhofmeister	Maria Anna Countess of Sulz ca. 1660 – 18 July 1698 eleven children	Oberhofmarschall and Oberhofmeister, known as the Plague King (Pestkönig)
Adam Franz, 3rd Prince of Schwarzenberg; Duke of Krumlov; 25 September 1680 – 11 Juni 1732			Obersthofmarschall (1711–1722); Oberstallmeister (1722–1732)	Eleonore Princess of Lobkowicz; 20 June 1682 – 5 May 1741 two children	First Duke of Krumlov, Count of Sulz and Princely Landgrave of Klettgau in the Schwarzenberg family Initiator of the Schwarzenberg Navigational Canal Killed accidentally by Emperor Charles VI during a driven shoot
Joseph I, 4th Prince of Schwarzenberg; Duke of Krumlov; 15 December 1722 – 17 February 1782			Obersthofmeister	Maria Theresia Princess von und zu Liechtenstein; 28 December 1721 – 19 January 1753 nine children	Obersthofmeister of Empress Maria Theresia, Minister of State, receives the Order of the Golden Fleece at the age of ten
Joseph II, 6th Prince of Schwarzenberg; Duke of Krumlov; 27 June 1769 – 19 December 1833			Ambassador	Pauline Princess of Arenberg-Aarschot; 2 September 1774 – burned to death in the night of 1–2 July 1810 nine children	Ambassador of the Austrian Empire in Paris Last Prince of Schwarzenberg, who possessed the imperial immediacy Founder of the Schwarzenberg Primogeniture
Karl Philipp Prince of Schwarzenberg; 15 April 1771 – 15 October 1820			Field marshal Ambassador	Maria Anna Countess von Hohenfeld widowed Princess Esterházy; 20 May 1768 – 2 April 1848 three sons	Austrian field marshal during the Napoleonic Wars and ambassador in St.Petersburg and Paris, Generalissimo of the Sixth Coalition in the Battle of the Nations at Leipzig Founder of the Schwarzenberg Secundogeniture
Ernst Prince of Schwarzenberg; 29 May 1773 – 14 March 1821			Bishop	-	Canon of Cologne, Liège, Salzburg, Passau, Esztergom and Bishop of Győr
Prince Felix of Schwarzenberg; The Austrian Bismarck; 2 October 1800 – 5 April 1852	Prince Felix of Schwarzenberg, Austrian statesman		Minister-President; Minister of Foreign Affairs Field Marshal Lieutenant	Two children with Jane Digby, Lady Ellenborough	Minister-President of the Austrian Empire between 1848 and 1852
Friedrich Prince of Schwarzenberg; The Lansquenet; 30 September 1800 – 6 March 1870			Major General; Writer	-	Major general of the Austrian Empire, Colonel of the General Staff in the Spanish First Carlist War, officer in the Swiss Sonderbund War and author, known as der Landsknecht (the Lansquenet)
Karl II Prince of Schwarzenberg; The Governor; 21 January 1802 – 25 June 1858			General of the branch (Military) Governor	Josephine Countess Wratislaw of Mitrovic; 16 April 1802 – 17 April 1881 one son	General of the branch of the Austrian Empire, Military Governor of Milan and Governor of the Principality of Transylvania (today Romania), known as der Gouverneur (the governor)
Edmund Prince of Schwarzenberg; 18 November 1803 – 17 November 1873			Field marshal	-	Last Austrian field marshal in the 19th century
Friedrich Prince of Schwarzenberg; 6 April 1809 – 27 March 1885			Cardinal; Archbishop; Primas Germaniae; Prince of the Church	-	Cardinal and Archbishop of Salzburg, then Archbishop of Prague
Felix Prince of Schwarzenberg; 8 June 1867 – 18 November 1946			Major general	Anna Princess zu Löwenstein-Wertheim-Rosenberg; 28 September 1873 – 27 June 1936 five children	Major general in World War I, one of only two recipients of the Golden Medal of Bravery for Officers by Emperor Charles I
Heinrich Prince of Schwarzenberg; Duke of Krumlov; 29 January 1903 – 18 June 1965			Public servant	Eleonore Countess zu Stolberg-Stolberg; 8 August 1920 – 27 Dezember 1994 one daughter	Austrian public servant and survivor of the Buchenwald concentration camp
Johannes Prince of Schwarzenberg; 31 January 1903 – 26 May 1978			Public servant	Kathleen Vicomtesse de Spoelberch; 19 May 1905 – 26 May 1978 two children	Austrian ambassador in Italy (1947–1955), to the Holy See (1955–1966) and Ambassador to the Court of St James's (1966–1969), Director and Delegate of the Red Cross and member of the Governing Board
Karel VI. Schwarzenberg; 5 July 1911 – 9 April 1986			Officer; Regent; Author	Antonia Princess zu Fürstenberg; 12 January 1905 – 24 December 1988 four children	Czech resistance fighter in World War II, Regent of the Grand Priory of Bohemia of the Order of Malta, historian and author
Karl, 12th Prince of Schwarzenberg; 10 December 1937 - 12 November 2023			Minister of Foreign Affairs of the Czech Republic; Vice prime minister Senator	Therese Countess zu Hardegg auf Glatz und im Machlande; 17 February 1940 two children	Czech politician, former Minister of Foreign Affairs (Czech Republic) and head of the House of Schwarzenberg

== Property and residences ==
=== Germany ===
The Schwarzenberg family holding included the following residences in Germany:

Name	Image	Location	Map	Comments
Schwarzenberg Castle	Schloß Schwarzenberg at Scheinfeld, Franconia	Scheinfeld, Franconia	Scheinfeld (Germany)	Ancestral seat Held to present
Stephansberg Castle	Stephansberg Castle, Middle Franconia	Kleinlangheim, Franconia	Stephansberg (Germany)	Acquired in 1243 through Apollonius The Older von Seinsheim. Sold through Siegismund von Schwarzenberg zu Hohenlandsberg in 1502 Destroyed in 1525 during the German Peasants' War.
Hohenlandsberg Castle	Hohenlandsberg Castle at Weigenheim, Middle Franconia	Weigenheim, Franconia	Weigenheim (Germany)	Acquired in 1436. Later main seat of the Schwarzenberg-Hohenlandsberg line Reconstructed in 1511 - 1524 Destroyed in 1554 during the Second Margrave War.
Palais Schwarzenberg (Frickenhausen am Main)	Palais Schwarzenberg at Frickenhausen am Main, Lower Franconia	Frickenhausen am Main, Lower Franconia	Palais Schwarzenberg (Germany)	
Wässerndorf Castle		Wässerndorf in Seinsheim, Lower Franconia	Wässerndorf (Germany)	In the 12th century, the family (still known as Seinsheim / de Sovensheim) served as the ministerialis in Wässerndorf. From 1263, it served as the main seat of the Seinsheim family. After the line Seinsheim-Westerndorf died out, the castle came in 1550 in full possession of Count Friedrich zu Schwarzenberg, who rebuilt the castle from 1555 onwards. From 1910 onwards, the family ′′′von Pölnitz′′′ lived in the castle. The castle was burned down by American troops on 5 April 1945.
Seehaus Castle	Seehaus Castle at Markt Nordheim, Middle Franconia	Markt Nordheim, Middle Franconia	Seehaus (Germany)	Acquired in 1655. Held until the German land reform in 1947.
Schnodsenbach Castle		Scheinfeld, Franconia	Schnodsenbach (Germany)	Held from 1789 - 1816
Gimborn Castle	Gimborn Castle in the Rhineland	Marienheide, North Rhine-Westphalia	Marienheide (Germany)	From 1631 on the residence in the imperial immediate Dominion of Gimborn of the Schwarzenberg Family Sold in 1782 to Johann Ludwig, Reichsgraf von Wallmoden-Gimborn
Hückeswagen Castle	Hückeswagen Castle in the Rhineland	Hückeswagen, North Rhine-Westphalia	Hückeswagen (Germany)	Received in 1631 as a fief 1653 loss of control due to occupation 1675 waiver of the fief by compensation
Haus Lay Water Castle	Haus Lay Water Castle in the Rhineland	Lay in Engelskirchen, North Rhine-Westphalia	Ley (Germany)	Acquired in 1654 1695 Reconstruction of the castle Sold in 1782
Neuenberg Castle	Neuenberg Castle in the Rhineland	Scheel in Lindlar, North Rhine-Westphalia	Scheel (Germany)	Acquired in 1629 1640 conquered and destroyed by the Swedes in the Thirty Years' War Ultimately demolished in 1663 Sold in 1782
Linzenich Castle	Linzenich Castle in the Rhineland	Bourheim in Jülich, North Rhine-Westphalia	Bourheim (Germany)	Acquired in 1606 Reconstruction of the castle chapel by the Schwarzenberg family Sold in 1645
Tiengen Castle		Waldshut-Tiengen, Baden-Württemberg	Waldshut-Tiengen (Germany)	Acquired in 1687 Sold in 1812
Küssaburg Castle		Küssaberg, Baden-Württemberg	Küssaburg (Germany)	Acquired in 1497 through the Sulz ancestors Destroyed but kept as a ruin in 1634 Sold in 1812
Jestetten Castle Oberes Schloss		Jestetten, Baden-Württemberg	Jestetten Castle (Germany)	Acquired in 1488 through Count Alwig X. von Sulz Second main residence of the Sulz family after Tiengen Became a part of the Schwarzenberg property through the family-unification Sold together with the entire Principality
Jestetten Fortress Unteres Schloss Greuthsches Schlösschen		Jestetten, Baden-Württemberg	Jestetten Castle (Germany)	Acquired in 1707 Sold together with the entire Principality
Willmendingen Castle		Wutöschingen, Baden-Württemberg	Willmendingen Castle (Germany)	Acquired in 1801 Sold in 1812
Illereichen Castle		Altenstadt, Bavarian Swabia	Illereichen Castle (Germany)	Herrschaft Schwarzenberg, Amt Illereichen Acquired in 1788 Sold in 1834
Kellmünz Castle		Kellmünz, Upper Swabia	Kellmünz Castle (Germany)	Herrschaft Schwarzenberg, Amt Kellmünz; Kellmünz becomes "Bavarian" and the Schwarzenberg family become Barons of the Empire of Kellmünz; Castle removed in 1809; Acquired in 1788; Sold in 1834
Michelbach Castle		Michelbach an der Lücke, Schwäbisch Hall	Michelbach Castle (Germany)	Given to Georg Ludwig by Ferdinand II in 1631; Destroyed in the Thirty Years War and rebuilt until 1709; Lost in 1806 with the Rheinbundakte.
Papenburg Castle Papenborch Castle Papenborg Castle		Papenburg, Emsland	Papenburg Castle (Germany)	Given by Sybille von Plettenberg to her second husband Friedrich Freiherr von Schwarzenberg in 1620. Sold by him in 1630 to Drost Dietrich von Velen.

=== Bohemia ===
The Schwarzenberg Estate in South Bohemia in 1840

The Schwarzenberg land holdings in Bohemia included the Duchy of Krumlov, the town of Prachatice and Orlík Castle. The family also acquired the property of the House of Rosenberg (Czech: Rožmberkové). On their lands, the Schwarzenbergs created ponds, planted forests and introduced new technologies in agriculture.

Upon the establishment of the Protectorate of Bohemia and Moravia in 1939, the possessions of Prince Adolph of Schwarzenberg were seized by the Nazi authorities. He managed to flee, but his cousin, Heinrich, Duke of Krumlov, was arrested and deported. After World War II, the Czechoslovak government stated, by law No. 143/1947 from August 13, 1947 (Lex Schwarzenberg), that the assets of the Schwarzenberg-Hluboká primogeniture passed to the Land of Bohemia.

The Schwarzenberg family holding included the following residences in Bohemia:

Name	Image	Location	Map	Comments
Český Krumlov Castle; Krumau Castle	Český Krumlov Castle	Český Krumlov, South Bohemia	Český Krumlov (Czech Republic)	Held from 1719 until the expropriation in 1947 UNESCO World Heritage Site One of the largest castles in the world
Hluboká Castle; Frauenberg Castle		Hluboká nad Vltavou, South Bohemia	Hluboká nad Vltavou (Czech Republic)	Acquired by Johann Adolf I of Schwarzenberg in 1661 Held until the expropriation in 1947 One of the finest examples of Neo-Tudor architecture in Historicism
Vimperk Castle; Winterberg Castle		Vimperk, South Bohemia	Vimperk (Czech Republic)	Acquired in 1698 Held until the expropriation in 1947
Třeboň Castle; Wittingau Castle		Třeboň, South Bohemia	Třeboň (Czech Republic)	Acquired in 1698 Held until the expropriation in 1947
Protivín Castle		Protivín, South Bohemia	Protivín (Czech Republic)	Acquired in 1711 Held until the expropriation in 1947
Kratochvíle Castle; Kurzweil Castle		Netolice, South Bohemia	Kratochvíle (Czech Republic)	Inherited in 1719 from the Princes of Eggenberg Held until the expropriation in 1947
Červený Dvůr Castle; Rothenhof Castle		Chvalšiny, South Bohemia	Chvalšiny (Czech Republic)	Inherited in 1719 from the Princes of Eggenberg Held until the expropriation in 1947
Borovany Castle; Forbes Castle		Borovany, South Bohemia	Borovany (Czech Republic)	Acquired in 1789 in exchange for the Dominion of Vlčice (German: Wildschütz) Held until the expropriation in 1947
Dříteň Castle; Zirnau Castle		Dříteň, South Bohemia	Dříteň (Czech Republic)	Acquired in 1698 Held until the expropriation in 1947
Drslavice Fortress; Drislawitz Fortress		Drslavice, South Bohemia	Drslavice (Czech Republic)	Acquired in 1698 Held until the expropriation in 1947
Kestřany Castle; Kesterschan Castle		Kestřany, South Bohemia	Kestřany (Czech Republic)	Acquired in 1700 Held until the First Land Reform in 1924
Old Libějovice Castle		Libějovice, South Bohemia	Libějovice (Czech Republic)	Acquired in 1801 Held until the expropriation in 1947
New Libějovice Castle		Libějovice, South Bohemia	Libějovice (Czech Republic)	Acquired in 1801 Rebuilt 1816 – 1817 Held until the expropriation in 1947
Ohrada Castle; Wohrad Castle		Hluboká nad Vltavou, South Bohemia	Hluboká nad Vltavou (Czech Republic)	Built 1708 – 1713 Held until the expropriation in 1947
Chýnov		Chýnov, South Bohemian Region	Chýnov (Czech Republic)	Acquired in 1719 Held until the expropriation in 1947
Postoloprty Castle; Postelberg Castle		Postoloprty, North Bohemia	Postoloprty (Czech Republic)	Acquired in 1692 Held until the expropriation in 1947
Nový Hrad; Neuschloß Castle		Jimlín, Ústí nad Labem Region	Nový Hrad (Czech Republic)	Acquired in 1767 Held until the expropriation in 1947
Lovosice; Lobositz Castle		Lovosice, Ústí nad Labem Region	Lovosice (Czech Republic)	Acquired in 1783 Original seat of the Schwarzenberg Archives Held until the expropriation in 1947
Cítoliby; Zittolieb or Zitolib Castle		Cítoliby, North Bohemia	Cítoliby (Czech Republic)	Acquired in 1803 Held until the First Land Reform in 1924
Domoušice; Domauschitz Castle		Domoušice, North Bohemia	Domoušice (Czech Republic)	Acquired in 1802 Held until the First Land Reform in 1924
Mšec; Kornhauz Castle		Mšec, North Bohemia	Mšec (Czech Republic)	Held until the expropriation in 1947
Divice Fortress		Vinařice (Louny District), Ústí nad Labem Region	Divice (Czech Republic)	Acquired in 1802 Held until the First Land Reform in 1924
Brodec Castle		Brodec (Louny District), Ústí nad Labem Region	Brodec (Czech Republic)	Acquired in 1802 Held until the First Land Reform in 1924
Dobrš Castle; Dobrž Castle; Dobersch Castle		Dobrš, South Bohemia	Dobrš (Czech Republic)	Acquired in 1707 Sold in the 19th century.
Vlčice Castle; Wildschütz Castle		Vlčice (Trutnov District)	Vlčice (Czech Republic)	Acquired in 1675 Held until 1789 Exchanged for Borovany
Břecštejn Castle; Silberstein Castle		Hrádeček (Vlčice)	Břecštejn (Czech Republic)	Acquired in 1675 Held until 1789 Exchanged for Borovany
Pravda Castle		Pnětluky, Ústí nad Labem Region	Pnětluky (Czech Republic)	Acquired in 1802
Orlík Castle; Worlik Castle		Orlík nad Vltavou, South Bohemia	Orlík nad Vltavou (Czech Republic)	Main residence of the Schwarzenberg Secundogeniture Restored in 1992 Held to present Publicly accessible
Čimelice Castle		Čimelice, South Bohemia	Čimelice (Czech Republic)	Acquired in 1840 through the marriage of Karl II Schwarzenberg with Josefina Marie Wratislaw of Mitrovic Spring and summer residence of the Schwarzenberg Secundogeniture Restored in 1992 Held to present
Karlov Castle		Karlov (Smetanova Lhota), South Bohemia	Karlov (Czech Republic)	Restored in 1992 Held to present
Varvažov Castle; Warwaschau Castle		Varvažov, South Bohemia	Varvažov (Czech Republic)	Acquired in 1847 from the Sovereign Military Order of Malta Restored in 1992 Held to present
Rakovice Castle		Rakovice, South Bohemia	Rakovice (Czech Republic)	Acquired in 1840 through the marriage of Karl II Schwarzenberg with Josefina Marie Wratislaw of Mitrovic Restored in 1992 Held to present
Sedlec Castle; Sedletz Castle		Sedlec in the town of Kutná Hora, Central Bohemia	Sedlec (Czech Republic)	Acquired in 1819 from the Cistercians Restored in 1992 Held to present
Dřevíč Castle; Grund Castle		Sýkořice, Central Bohemian Region	Dřevíč Castle (Czech Republic)	Built by Joseph Wilhelm Ernst, Prince of Fürstenberg in the first half of the 18th century Sold by Maximilian Egon II, Prince of Fürstenberg to Czechoslovakia Acquired by Karel Schwarzenberg in 1991 Held to present
Hunting lodge Tyrolský dům Tiroler Haus		Květov, South Bohemia	Květov (Czech Republic)	Restored in 1992 Held to present
Nový Dvůr; Neuhof		Obora u Cerhonic, South Bohemia	Nový Dvůr (Czech Republic)	Acquired by Dr. Friedrich & Regula Schwarzenberg in the 1990s Held to present and main seat of Ferdinand Schwarzenberg
Tochovice Castle		Tochovice, South Bohemia	Tochovice (Czech Republic)	Acquired in 1840 through the marriage of Karl II Schwarzenberg with Josefina Marie Wratislaw of Mitrovic Restored in 1992 Seat of Ernst Schwarzenberg's descendants Sold in 2022
Zbenice Castle		Zbenice, Central Bohemian Region	Zbenice (Czech Republic)	Acquired in 1805 through Karl I Schwarzenberg Held until 1948
Bukovany Castle; Schloss Bukowan		Bukovany u Kozárovic, Central Bohemian Region	Bukovany (Czech Republic)	Acquired in 1816 through Karl I Schwarzenberg Held until the First Land Reform in 1925
Zalužany Castle		Zalužany, South Bohemia	Zalužany (Czech Republic)	Held until the First Land Reform in 1924
Osov Castle		Osov, South Bohemia	Osov (Czech Republic)	Acquired in 1840. Sold in 1927.
Zvíkov Castle; Zwingenberg Castle		Zvíkovské Podhradí, South Bohemia	Zvíkov (Czech Republic)	Held until 1948. In 1992 it was returned to the family and handed over to the care of the state. Publicly accessible
Starosedlský Hrádek Castle; Altsattler Bürgel Castle		Starosedlský Hrádek, Central Bohemia	Starosedlský Hrádek (Czech Republic)	Held until 1948.
Palais Schwarzenberg; Schwarzenberský palác		Prague	Prague (Czech Republic)	Acquired in 1719 Held until the expropriation in 1947 Publicly accessible
Palais Salm; Salmovský palác Small Palais Schwarzenberg		Prague	Prague (Czech Republic)	Acquired in 1811 Held until the expropriation in 1947
Palais Deym; Deymův palác		Prague	Prague (Czech Republic)	Acquired in 1845 Prague seat of the Schwarzenberg Secundogeniture Held to present
Palais Bissing; Bissingenský palác Tatarkovic dům Schwarzenberský dům		Prague	Palais Bissing (Czech Republic)	Acquired in 1850 Consisting of two buildings: No. 90/17 (larger building with Schwarzenberg CoA) and No. 91/19.

=== Austria ===
The Schwarzenberg family holdings included the following residences in Austria:

Name	Image	Location	Map	Comments
Palais Schwarzenberg; Gartenpalais Schwarzenberg		Schwarzenbergplatz, Landstraße, Vienna	Vienna (Austria)	Acquired in 1716 In the James Bond movie The Living Daylights it served as a film set Held to present
Palais Schwarzenberg; Winterpalais Schwarzenberg		Neuer Markt, Innere Stadt, Vienna	Vienna (Austria)	Acquired in 1688 1894 demolished
Hirschstetten Castle		Hirschstetten, Vienna	Vienna (Austria)	Acquired in 1713 Sold in 1750
Neuwaldegg Castle; Villa Schwarzenberg		Hernals, Vienna	Vienna (Austria)	Acquired in 1801 Sold in 1951
Palais Schwarzenberg		Laxenburg, Lower Austria	Laxenburg (Austria)	Acquired in 1703 Architect was Johann Lukas von Hildebrandt Sold in 1850
Palais Schwarzenberg		Graz, Styria	Graz (Austria)	Acquired in 1775 Sold in 1853/54
Murau Castle; Obermurau Castle		Murau, Styria	Murau (Austria)	Publicly accessible on appointment Held to present
Grünfels Castle; Old Castle		Murau, Styria	Murau (Austria)	Held to present
Wintergrün Castle		Ramingstein, Salzburg	Ramingstein (Austria)	Held to present
Schrattenberg Castle		Scheifling, Styria	Schrattenberg (Austria)	Acquired by Prince Ferdinand in 1704 Main residence of the Schwarzenberg family in the Murtal until its destruction Total destruction through a fire, which occurred during restoration works, in 1915 Held to present
Katsch Castle		Teufenbach-Katsch, Styria	Katsch (Austria)	Acquired in 1697 Partial deconstruction in 1838 Total destruction in 1858 Held to present
Gusterheim Castle		Pöls, Styria	Pöls (Austria)	Acquired in 1698 by Prince Ferdinand together with the Dominions Reifenstein and Offenburg. The daughter of Prince Heinrich, Elisabeth von Pezold, Princess of Schwarzenberg, inherited the castle. Held to present by the Pezold family
Ratzenegg Castle		Moosburg, Carinthia	Moosburg (Austria)	Seat of the descendants of Prince Erkinger Held to present
Tschakathurn Castle; Schachenthurn Castle; Schachenturm Castle		Scheifling, Styria	Tschakathurn (Austria)	Acquired in 1740 Total destruction through a fire in 1792 The daughter of Prince Johann II, Countess Ida Revertera von Salandra, Princess of Schwarzenberg, inherited the castle. Held to present by the Revertera family
Goppelsbach Castle		Stadl-Predlitz, Styria	Goppelsbach (Austria)	Acquired in 1839 Sold in 1938
Vöstenhof Castle		Bürg-Vöstenhof, Lower Austria	Vöstenhof Castle (Austria)	Acquired in 1937 through HSH Princess Therese Schwarzenberg; Inherited in 1945 by her daughter Countess Josephine Czernin.
Hanfelden Castle		Pölstal, formerly Unterzeiring in Oberzeiring, Styria	Hanfelden Castle (Austria)	Acquired in 1783 through HSH Prince Johann Schwarzenberg; Sold in 1856.

=== Slovakia ===
The Schwarzenberg family holding included the following residence in Slovakia, which was part of the Lands of the Crown of Saint Stephen:

Name	Image	Location	Map	Comments
Marianka Castle	Marianka Castle at Marianka, Bratislava Region	Marianka, Bratislava Region	Marianka (Slovakia)	Purchased by Friedrich "The Landsknecht" in 1839

=== Belgium and Luxembourg ===
The Schwarzenberg family holding included the following residence in today's Belgium and Luxembourg, while their main residence and burial place was in the city of Liège. Back then, the Spanish Netherlands, Prince-Bishopric of Liège and Duchy of Luxemburg were states within the Holy Roman Empire. The Schwarzenberg family held in this region the titles of Seigneur de Bierset et de Champlon.

Name	Image	Location	Map	Comments
Fischbach Castle	Fischbach Castle, Fischbach	Fischbach, Canton of Mersch	Fischbach (Luxembourg)	Inherited through the marriage of Johann Gerhard (1571 - 1635) with Dorothea de Naves (1629), heiress of Chiveri and Fischbach.
Hassonville Castle	Hassonville Castle, Marche-en-Famenne	Marche-en-Famenne, Luxembourg (Belgium)	Hassonville (Belgium)	1603 Johann Gerhard acquired Humain and Hassonville. 1678: Sold to Etienne de Rossius de Liboy.
Raeren Castle	Raeren Castle, Raeren	Raeren, Liège Province	Raeren (Belgium)	Mathias de Flamige, married with Wilhelmina de Notomb, sold the castle to Jean-Henri de Schwarzenberg bought the castle on 27 January 1790. However Baron Charles-Henri de Broich who was an in-law of the seller, bought back the estate and later sold it again to Baron Philippe de Witte de Limminghe.

== Ecclesiastical buildings and places ==
The following religious places are linked to the Schwarzenberg family either as burial or memorial places:

Name	Image	Location	Map	Comments
Astheim Charterhouse	Astheim Charterhouse	Volkach, Franconia	Volkach (Germany)	Founded by Erkinger, 1st Baron of Schwarzenberg in 1409 First burial site of the Schwarzenberg family
Schwarzenberg Monastery	Astheim Charterhouse	Scheinfeld, Franconia	Schwarzenberg Monastery (Germany)	Founded in 1702
St. Vitus Cathedral Schwarzenberg Chapel	Schwarzenberg Chapel	Prague, Czech Republic	Prague (Czech Republic)	Located in the St. Vitus Cathedral.
Schwarzenberg Crypt (Domanín)	Schwarzenberg Crypt (Domanín)	Domanín (Jindřichův Hradec District), Czech Republic	Schwarzenberg Crypt (Domanín) (Czech Republic)	Constructed from 1874 – 1877. Burial site of the Schwarzenberg Primogeniture. In family possession Partially accessible to the public.
Schwarzenberg Crypt (Orlík nad Vltavou)	Schwarzenberg Crypt (Orlík nad Vltavou)	Orlík nad Vltavou, Czech Republic	Schwarzenberg Crypt (Orlík nad Vltavou) (Czech Republic)	Burial site of the Schwarzenberg Secundogeniture. In family possession Active in use and not open to the public.
Sedlec Ossuary	Schwarzenberg Coat of Arms in Sedlec Ossuary	Kutná Hora, Czech Republic	Sedlec Ossuary in Kutná Hora (Czech Republic)	Part of the World Heritage Site Sedlec Abbey Large Schwarzenberg Secundogeniture coat of arms made out of human bones.
Zlatá Koruna Monastery Goldenkorn Monastery		Zlatá Koruna, Czech Republic	Zlatá Koruna Monastery (Czech Republic)	Founded by King Ottokar II of Bohemia in 1263. The Schwarzenberg family inherited in 1719 the Jus patronatus of the Eggenberg family. In 1785, the family acquired the monastery after its closure due to the Josephinist Reform. It was used as a manufacture until 1909. It was confiscated under the Lex Schwarzenberg in 1948.
Vyšší Brod Monastery Goldenkorn Monastery		Vyšší Brod, Czech Republic	Vyšší Brod Monastery (Czech Republic)	Founded by Wok I von Rosenberg in 1259. The Schwarzenberg family inherited in 1719 the Jus patronatus of the Eggenberg family and kept it for more than a century until 1822.
St. Laurentius Church	Tomb of Rittmeister Friedrich Prinz zu Schwarzenberg	Weinheim, Germany	St. Laurentius Church (Germany)	Tomb of Rittmeister Friedrich Prinz zu Schwarzenberg.
All Saints' Church, Wittenberg	Schwarzenberg Coat of Arms in Sedlec Ossuary	Wittenberg, Germany	All Saints' Church, Wittenberg (Germany)	World Heritage Site Site where the Ninety-five Theses were likely posted by Martin Luther in 1517. Schwarzenberg coat of arms on the balustrade of the organ to commemorate Johann of Schwarzenberg as one of Luther's first followers.
San Gian Church Sankt Johannes	Brandis Coat of Arms in the wooden ceiling	Celerina/Schlarigna, Switzerland	San Gian Church (Switzerland)	The wooden ceiling from 1478, displaying the Brandis coat of arms, today embedded in the Schwarzenberg arms through the unification with Sulz, is considered one of the best preserved wooden church ceilings in Graubünden. It shows the Coat of Arms of Bishop Ortlieb von Brandis (1458-1491), Lord of Brandis in Maienfeld.

== Monuments and memorials ==
The following monuments are erected for the Schwarzenberg family and its members:

Name	Picture	Map	Comment
Schwarzenbergplatz	Karl Philipp Schwarzenberg	Schwarzenbergplatz (Austria)	Inaugurated in 1867 Commemorating the victory of Karl Philipp Schwarzenberg at the Battle of the Nations in 1813
Monument to the Battle of the Nations	Monument to the Battle of the Nations	Monument to the Battle of the Nations (Germany)	Inaugurated in 1913 Commemorating the victory (of Karl Philipp Schwarzenberg) at the Battle of the Nations in 1813 Length: 80 metres (260 ft); Width: 70 metres (230 ft); Height: 91 metres (299 ft)
Monument to Karl Philipp SchwarzenbergKarlovy Vary			Installed in 1818, reconstructed in 1891 and 1991.
Schwarzenberg-Pálffy Monument	Schwarzenberg-Pálffy Monument	Schwarzenberg-Pálffy Monument (Hungary)	Inaugurated in 1998 Commemorating the victory at the Battle of Györ of Adolf Schwarzenberg in 1598
Statue of Cardinal Friedrich Schwarzenberg		Prague (Czech Republic)	Located in the St. Vitus Cathedral in the Prague Castle Memorial to Cardinal Friedrich Schwarzenberg
Schwarzenberg Monument in Meusdorf (Leipzig)	Schwarzenberg Monument in Meusdorf	Meusdorf (Leipzig) (Germany)	Inaugurated in 1838 Commemorating the victory of Karl Philipp Schwarzenberg at the Battle of the Nations in 1813 Commissioned by Karl Philipp's wife and his three sons
Schwarzenberg Memorial on the peak of Plattenkogel Mountain	Schwarzenberg Memorial on the peak of Plattenkogel Mountain	Plattenkogel (Austria)	Commemorating the presence of Cardinal Friedrich Schwarzenberg
Walhalla Memorial Bust of Karl Philipp Schwarzenberg	Second from the right in the lowest row	Donaustauf (Germany)	Inaugurated in 1842 Commemorating the victory of Karl Philipp Schwarzenberg at the Battle of the Nations in 1813 The original bust was created by Johann Nepomuk Schaller in 1821
Ruhmeshalle (Munich) Bust of Karl Philipp Schwarzenberg	Ruhmeshalle	Munich (Germany)	Inaugurated in 1853
Heldenberg Memorial Bust of Karl Philipp Schwarzenberg		Heldenberg Memorial (Austria)	Inaugurated in 1849 One of four Schwarzenberg busts in the Heldenberg Memorial
Heldenberg Memorial Bust of Edmund Schwarzenberg	Edmund Schwarzenberg	Heldenberg Memorial (Austria)	Inaugurated in 1849 One of four Schwarzenberg busts in the Heldenberg Memorial
Heldenberg Memorial Bust of Adolf Schwarzenberg	Adolf Schwarzenberg	Heldenberg Memorial (Austria)	Inaugurated in 1849 One of four Schwarzenberg busts in the Heldenberg Memorial
Heldenberg Memorial Bust of Felix Schwarzenberg	Felix Schwarzenberg	Heldenberg Memorial (Austria)	Inaugurated in 1849 One of four Schwarzenberg busts in the Heldenberg Memorial
Thorvaldsen Museum Bust of Karl Philipp Schwarzenberg	Karl Philipp Schwarzenberg	Thorvaldsen Museum (Denmark)	Created by Bertel Thorvaldsen
Capuchin Church Bust of Schwarzenberg Uhlans Memorial	Schwarzenberg Uhlans Memorial	Capuchin Church (Austria)	The same church is used as the Imperial Crypt of the Habsburg family
Commemorative Obelisk Monument for Prince Karl II Schwarzenberg		Dealu Frumos (Romania)	Inaugurated in 1858 Commemorating the decision of HSH Military-Governor Karl II to build a road between the districts Hermannstadt, Leschkirch, Agnetheln and Gross-Schenk.

== The family ==
=== Heads of the family and title progression ===
**Lords of Seinsheim**
Conrad
...
Apollonius d. Ä. (died 1311)
...
Hildebrand (IV) (died 1386)
Michael (I); Michael (I) (died 1399)
Erkinger (VI/I) (1362–1437)

**Barons of Schwarzenberg**
Erkinger (VI/I) (1362–1437) same as before
Michael II (1437–1469)
Michael III (1469–1499)
Erkinger II (1499–1510)
Wilhelm I (1510–1526)
Wilhelm II (1526–1557)
Adolf (1557–1599)

**Counts of Schwarzenberg**
Adolf (1557–1599) same as before
Adam I Franz (1600–1641)
Johann Adolf I (1641–1670)

**Princes of Schwarzenberg**
Johann Adolf I (1641–1670) same as before
Ferdinand (1683–1703)
Adam II Franz (1703–1732); Duke of Krumlov from 1723
Joseph I Adam (1732–1782)
Johann I (1782–1789)

**Princes of Schwarzenberg**; Primogenutre
Joseph II (1789–1833)
Johann Adolf II (1833–1888)
Adolf Joseph (1888–1914)
Johann II (1914–1938)
Adolph (1938–1950)
Joseph III; **Titular Head of the Family** (1950–1979)
Prinz Heinrich; **Acting Head of the Family**; Adopted by Adolph (1950–1965)

**Princes of Schwarzenberg**; Secundogeniture
Karl I Philipp (1789–1820)
Karl II (1820–1858)
Karl III (1858–1904)
Karl IV (1904–1913)
Karl V (1913–1914)
Karl VI (1914–1986)
Karl VII/I; **Adopted by Heinrich**; 1965 Takeover of the Primogeniture Estate; 1979 Headship Primogeniture; 1986 Headship Secundogenitiure (1937–2023)

**Princes of Schwarzenberg**; Unified
Karl VII/I; **Adopted by Heinrich**; 1965 Takeover of the Primogeniture Estate; 1979 Headship Primogeniture; 1986 Headship Secundogenitiure (1937–2023) same as before
Johannes (1967 -)

=== Lines (including Sulz offspring) ===
**Sulz**; Alwig I. *1071 - †1095	**Alaholfinger**; Erchanger ca. *860 - † ca. 917
**Seinsheim**; Conrad; Son of Erchanger -
**Seinsheim**; Apollonius the Older † ca. 1243
**Older Stephansberger Line**; Ältere Stephansberg'sche Linie; Hildebrand † 1386	**Younger Seinsheim Line**; Jüngere Seinsheim'sche Linie; Friedrich -
**Schwarzenberg**; Erkinger I. *1362 - † 1437
**Stephansberger Line**; Stephansberg'sche Linie; Michael; *1403 - † 1469	**Hohenlandsberger Line**; Hohenlandsberg'sche Linie; Sigismund; *1430 - † 1502
**Dutch Line**; Niederländische Linie; Wilhelm ⚔ 1526	**Liége Line**; Lüttich'sche Linie; Edmund -	**Frisian Line**; Frisische Linie; Michael (*) - † 1489	**Franconian Hohenlandsberger Line**; Fränkisch Hohenlandsberg'sche Linie - -	**Bavarian Hohenlandsberger Line**; Bayrisch Hohenlandsberg'sche Linie - -
**Princely Line**; Fürstliche Linie; Johann Adolf I. *1615 - †1683	**Frisian Line**; Frisische Linie - -	**Prussian Line**; Preussische Linie; Georg; *1842 - † 1918	**Older Bavarian Hohenlandsberger Line**; Ältere Bayrisch Hohenlandsberg'sche Linie; Christoph I. †1538 - Georg Ludwig *1586 -†1646	← succession	**Younger Bavarian Hohenlandsberger Line**; Jüngere Bayrisch Hohenlandsberg'sche Linie; Sebastian †1586
**Sulz**; Maria Anna †1698 ⚭ Ferdinand *1652 - †1703	← succession
**Primogeniture or Hluboká Line**; Primogenitur oder Frauenberger Linie; Joseph II. *1769 - †1833	**Secundogeniture or Orlík Line**; Sekundogenitur oder Worliker Linie; Karl I. Philipp; *1771 - †1820
**United House**; Vereinigtes Haus; Karl; *1937 - †2023

=== Dynasty ===
The names hereby presented are those of all the direct successors of the Prince John I of Schwarzenberg (1742–1789). They have been respectively divided into the two branches of Krumlov and Orlik, including the contemporary generations. For the genealogy to be easier to consult, the male successors alone are listed, and they are accompanied with noteworthy information where necessary. In bold the names of the members of the eldest part of the family.

- **Jan I Nepomuk** (1742–1789), 5th Prince of Schwarzenberg, 10th (3rd of his line) Duke of Krumlov
  - A1. **Josef II Jan** (1769–1833), 6th Prince of Schwarzenberg, 11th (4th of his line) Duke of Krumlov (1789–1833), founder of the main branch of the family (that of Frauenberg-Krummau)
    - B1. **Jan Adolf II** (1799–1888), 7th Prince of Schwarzenberg, 12th (5th of his line) Duke of Krumlov (1833–1888)
      - C1. **Adolf Josef** (1832–1914), 8th Prince of Schwarzenberg, 13th (6th of his line) Duke of Krumlov (1888–1914)
        - D1. **Jan II Nepomuk** (1860–1938), 9th Prince of Schwarzenberg, 14th (7th of his line) Duke of Krumlov (1914–1938)
          - E1. **Adolph Jan** (1890–1950), 10th Prince of Schwarzenberg, 15th (8th of his line) Duke of Krumlov (1938–1950)
          - E2. Karl (1892–1919)
          - E3. Edmund Černov (1897–1932), Called "Black Sheep" as a consequence of the refusal of his surname
        - D2. Alois (1863–1937)
        - D3. Felix (1867–1946), Major-General Austro-Hungarian Army
          - E1. **Josef III** (1900–1979), 11th Prince of Schwarzenberg (1950–1979), last member of the eldest side of the dynasty
          - E2. **Heinrich** (1903–1965), 16th (9th of his line) Duke of Krumlov (1950–1965) **(adopted G1. Karel (VII/I))**
        - D4. Georg (1867–1952)
        - D5. Karel (1871–1902)
      - C2. Cajus (1839–1841)
    - B2. Felix (1800–1852), Prime Minister of the Austrian Empire
    - B3. Friedrich (1809–1885), Archbishop of Prague
  - A2. Karel I Philipp (1771–1820), Prince of Schwarzenberg, founder and chief of the second line of the family (Orlík)
    - B1. Friedrich (1800–1870), who renounced his right of majorat in favour of his brother
    - B2. Karl II (1802–1858)
      - C1. Karel III (1824–1904)
        - D1. Karel IV (1859–1913)
          - E1. Karel V (1886–1914), Major Austro-Hungarian Army in WWI
            - F1. Karel VI (1911–1986), Lieutenant Czechoslovak Army, Dr.phil.
              - G1. **Karel (VII / I) Schwarzenberg** (1937–2023), 12th Prince of Schwarzenberg (1979–2023), 17th (10th of his line) Duke of Krumlov (1965–2023), former Minister of the Foreign Affairs and candidate to the head of state for the Czech Republic in 2013. He unified the two lines of the family.
                - H1.**Jan III Nepomuk** (born 1967), 13th Prince of Schwarzenberg (from 2023), 18th (11th of his line) Duke of Krumlov (from 2023), current CEO of the family companies
              - G2. Friedrich (1940–2014), Dr.rer.oec., Director at UBS and Mirabaud Group
                - H1. Ferdinand (born 1989), Head of Region at Porsche, First Lieutenant Swiss Armed Forces, Forbes 30 under 30 (Czech edition, 2019)
                  - I1. Friedrich (born 2024), descendent through his mother from Empress Maria Theresa
            - F2. Franz (1913–1992), Professor at Loyola University Chicago, Dr.jur.
              - G1. Jan (born 1957), Officer of the United States, U.S. Navy Captain, former US Navy Special Operations Officer, Deputy Dir. of US Pacific Command's Joint Interagency Coordination Group for Counter-terrorism and Commander of the Combined Joint Task Force Paladin in Afghanistan
                - H1. Alexander (born 1984), B.Sc. (Criminal Justice), USMC (US Marine Corps) Law Enforcement Police Officer, DoD/USMC Special Reaction Team, Field Training Officer, Corporal, (Retired/Separated) U.S. Treasury Department, Sergeant.
          - E2. Ernst (1892–1979), Major Czechoslovak Army
          - E3. Josef (1894–1894)
          - E4. Johann von Nepomuk (1903–1978), Austrian Ambassador in Rome and London, Dr.jur.utr.
            - F1. Erkinger (1933–2022), Dr. phil., archaeologist
              - G1. Johannes (born 1963), Dr.rer.nat., Dr.med.univ.
              - G2. Alexander (born 1971),
                - H1. Karl Philipp (born 2003)
        - D2. Friedrich (1862–1936)
    - B2. Edmund Leopold (1803–1873), Austrian Marshal

=== Family tree: secundogeniture ===
**Schwarzenberg Secundogeniture**; Orlik Branch
**Karl I Philipp** ⚭ Maria Anna Hohenfeld
**Friedrich**	Karl II ⚭ Josefina Marie Wratislaw	Edmund
**Karl III** ⚭ Wilhelmine Oettingen-Wallerstein	Gabriele	Anna Maria ⚭ Ernst Waldstein
Anna Maria ⚭ Franz Anton Thun-Hohenstein	Gabriele ⚭ Franz Josef Silva-Tarouca	**Karl IV** ⚭ 1.Marie Theresia Kinsky; 2.Ida Hoyos	Ida ⚭ Johann Karl Lazansky - Bukowa	Maria ⚭ Ferdinand Trauttmansdorf
**Karl V** ⚭ Eleonore Clam-Gallas	Eleonore ⚭ Johann Friedrich Hartig	Johannes ⚭ Kathleen de Spoelberch	Ernst ⚭: 1. Elisabeth Széchenyi; 2. Mathilde Gerber	Joseph	Maria Wilhelmine
**Karl VI** ⚭ Antonie Fürstenberg	Heinrich ⚭ Eleonore Stolberg-Stolberg	Franz ⚭ Amálie Lobkowicz	Erkinger ⚭: 1. Elisabeth Constantinides; 2. Claudia Brandis	Colienne ⚭ Maximilian Meran	Anna Maria ⚭ Adolf Bucher
Marie Eleonore ⚭ Leopold-Bill Bredow	**Karl** ⚭ Therese Hardegg	Thomas Prinzhorn	Friedrich ⚭ Regula Schlegel	Anna Maria ⚭ Elmar Haxthausen	Ludmila ⚭: 1. Carl Hess; 2.James Truman Bidwell jr.	Isabela ⚭ Louis Harnier	Jan ⚭ Regina Hogan	Johannes ⚭ Julia	Anna Gabriella ⚭ 1.Philipp Waechter; 2.Adam P. Dixon	Alexander ⚭ 1.Annabel Dimitriadis; 2.Elena Bonanno	Gaia ⚭ Loïc van Cutsem	Ida ⚭ Baudouin de Troostembergh
Johannes ⚭ 1.Diana Orgovanyi-Hanstein; 2.Francesca Riario Sforza	Anna Carolina ⚭ Peter Morgan	Karl Philipp Prinzhorn ⚭ Anna Eltz	Marie	Ferdinand ⚭ Marie Friling	Alexander	Lara	Nicholas	Karl Philipp	Anna-Gabriella	Anna Elisabetta
Friedrich

== Titles ==
=== Titles of the members of the family ===
Styles of Princes(ses) of Schwarzenberg
- Reference style: His/Her Serene Highness
- Spoken style: Your Serene Highness

The title of the head of the princely family is:

- HSH The Prince of Schwarzenberg, Duke of Krumlov, Count of Sulz, Princely Landgrave of Klettgau
  - (German: S.D. der Fürst zu Schwarzenberg, Herzog von Krummau, Graf von Sulz, gefürsteter Landgraf im Klettgau)

The title of the wife of the head of the family would be:

- HSH The Princess of Schwarzenberg, Duchess of Krumlov, Countess of Sulz, Princely Landgravine of Klettgau
  - (German: I.D. die Fürstin zu Schwarzenberg, Herzogin von Krummau, Gräfin von Sulz, gefürstete Landgräfin im Klettgau)

The title of the first born son and heir of the family is:

- HSH The Hereditary Prince of Schwarzenberg, Duke of Krumlov, Count of Sulz, Landgrave of Klettgau
  - (German: S.D. der Erbprinz zu Schwarzenberg, Herzog von Krummau, Graf von Sulz, Landgraf im Kledage)

The title of the wife of the first born son and heir of the family would be:

- HSH The Hereditary Princess of Schwarzenberg, Duchess of Krumlov, Countess of Sulz, Landgravine of Klettgau
  - (German: I.D. die Erbprinzessin zu Schwarzenberg, Herzogin von Krummau, Gräfin von Sulz, Landgräfin im Klettgau)

The title of all other female members of the family is:

- HSH Princess Name of Schwarzenberg, Countess of Sulz, Landgravine of Klettgau
  - (German: I.D. Prinzessin Name zu Schwarzenberg, Gräfin von Sulz, Landgräfin im Klettgau)

The title of all other male members of the family is:

- HSH Prince Name of Schwarzenberg, Count of Sulz, Landgrave of Klettgau
  - (German: S.D. Prinz Name zu Schwarzenberg, Graf von Sulz, Landgraf im Klettgau)

Although the family is entitled to use the von und zu, only the zu is applied. Moreover, all members of the family are allowed to use the title Fürst / Fürstin. However, this is not anymore practiced since the late 19th century and the cognates refer to themselves as Prinz / Prinzessin.

=== Title progression ===
- Baron of the Holy Roman Empire
  Preßburg 10.8.1429
- Imperial Count
  Prague 5.6.1599
- Landsmannschaft in Steiermark
  6.4.1647
- Bohemian Inkolat
  Regensburg 25.4.1654
- Hungarian Indigenat
  1659
- Princes of the Holy Roman Empire
  Vienna 14.7.1670
- Grand Palatinate
  Vienna 20.10.1671
- Members of the Imperial Diet
  Vienna 22.8.1671
- Members of the Imperial Diet of Counts in Westphalia
  13.4.1674
- Members of the Higher Nobility (Alter Herrenstand) in Lower Austria
  Vienna 11.2.1694
- Members of the Imperial Diet of Swabian Princes
  30.11.1696
- Endowment of two majorats
  20.10.1703
- Rise to Dukes of Krumlov
  1719
- Bohemian Duke (of Krumlov)
  Prague 25.9.1723
- Bohemian Princes (Fürst) for all family members
  Vienna 5.12.1746
- Princes of the Holy Roman Empire (Reichsfürst) for all family members
  Vienna 8.12.1746

== Coat of arms ==
=== Family coat of arms ===
The ancestral arms of the Lords of Seinsheim consisted of six vertical stripes in silver and blue. However, the Schwarzenberg family's original coat of arms has four silver and four blue vertical stripes. Moreover, it starts with silver on the heraldic right (mirror-inverted perspective).

The family became Freiherren (Barons) of Schwarzenberg in 1429, and a silver tower on a black hill was added to their coat of arms to represent the city Scheinfeld and Schwarzenberg Castle.

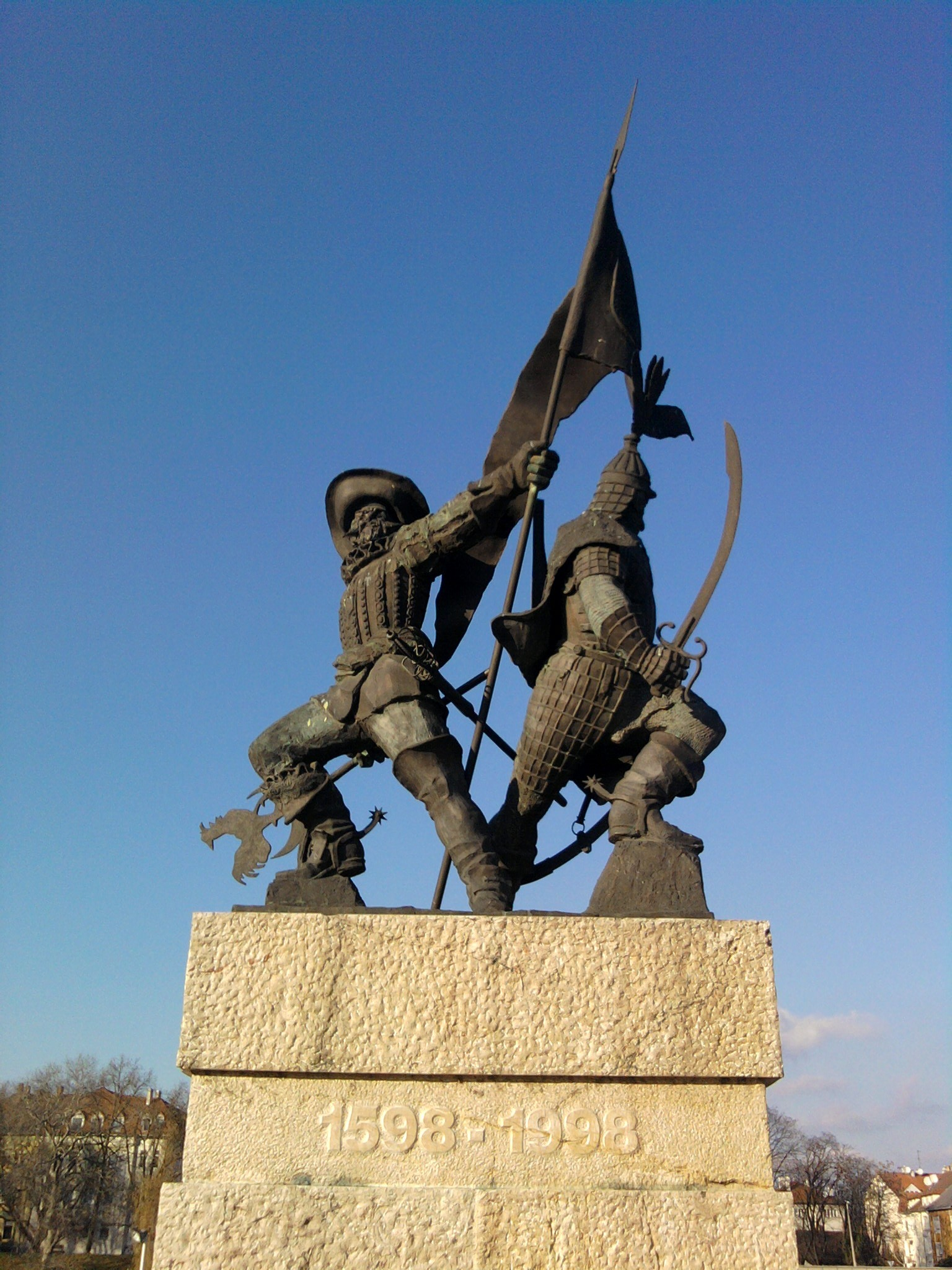
Monument to the recapture of Győr, Hungary (1598) in memory of 1998; Adolf von Schwarzenberg (l.), Miklós Pálffy (r.)

In 1599, Adolf von Schwarzenberg became an Imperial Count, and was given by the emperor a quarter with a canting arms showing the head of a Turk being pecked by a raven. This was to commemorate Adolf's conquest on 19 March 1598 of the Turkish-held fortress and city Győr. The German name of the Hungarian town is Raab, which means raven.

In 1670, the Schwarzenbergs were raised to princely status. However, only the marriage of Ferdinand, The 2nd Prince of Schwarzenberg (1652–1703) with Marie Anna Countess of Sulz (1653–1698), the daughter of Johann Ludwig II Count of Sulz (1626–1687), led to the augmenting of their coat of arms, with quarters added for the domains of Sulz, Brandis (canting arms: a brand) and the Landgraviate of Klettgau. Due to the absence of a male heir, Count Rudolf requested at the imperial court that the two families should be consolidated. This was granted, which meant for the Schwarzenberg family not only to assume all titles, rights and duties of the Counts of Sulz, but also to inherit all of Rudolf's properties.

The last augmentation of the family coat of arms was granted by the Austrian Emperor Franz II/I, he rewarded Field Marshal Karl I Philipp Prince of Schwarzenberg with the right to bear the three-part arms of the Habsburg family with the addition of an upright standing sword. This unique distinction was granted to commemorate the field marshal's victory in the Battle of the Nations, where he was the Generalissimo of the Sixth Coalition.

The family motto is NIL NISI RECTUM (Nothing but the right thing).

==== Evolution ====
Ancient Coat of Arms

Stephansberger line

Franconian-Hohenlandsberg line

Dutch (princely) line

Primogeniture (princely line)

Secundogeniture (princely line)

==== Fields ====
House of Schwarzenberg

Sulz county and family

Brandis family

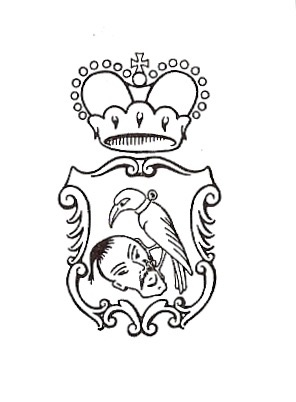
Augmentation of honour for the Siege of Győr in 1598

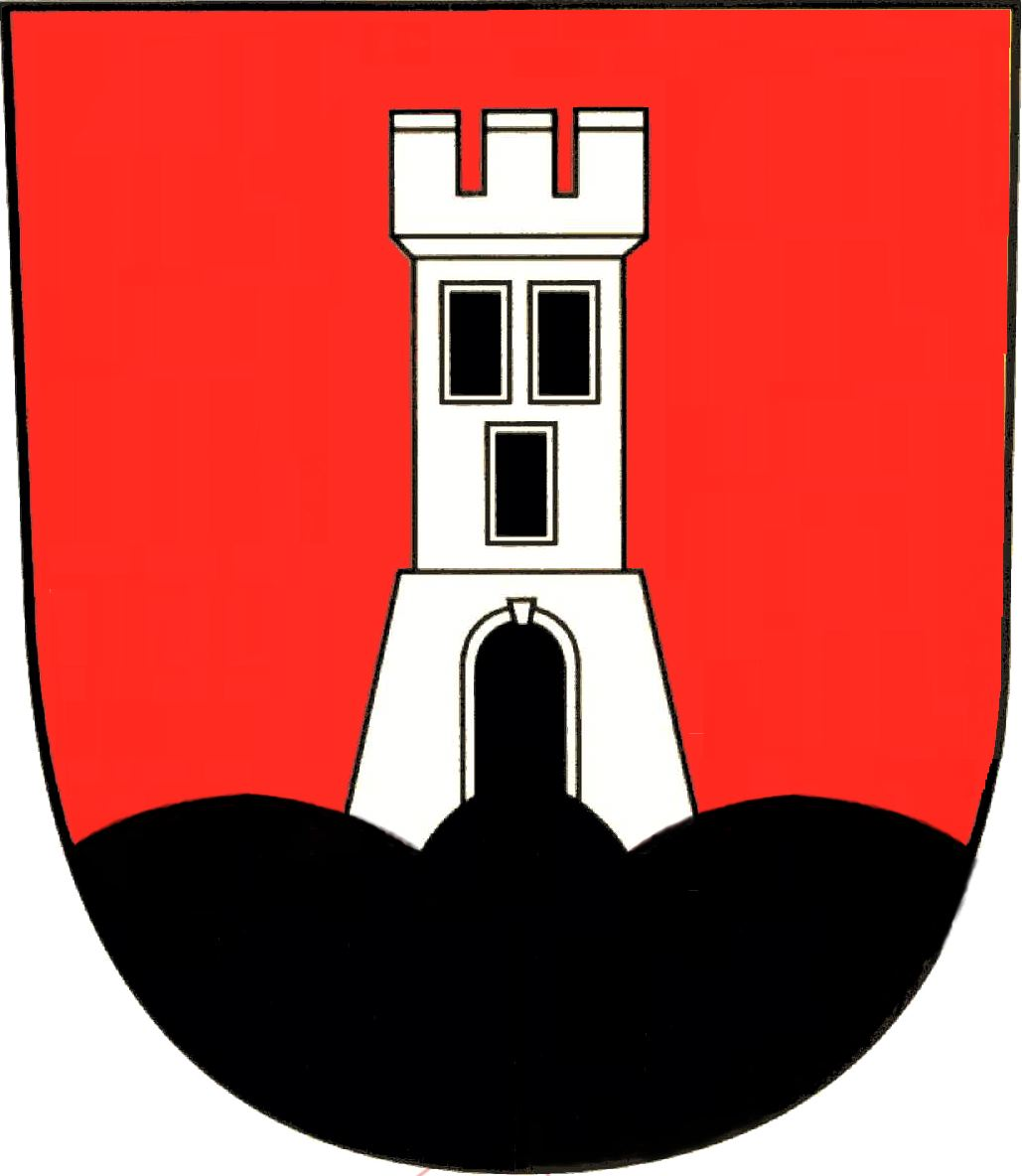
Princely County of Schwarzenberg

Princely Landgraviate of Klettgau

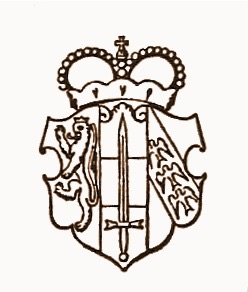
Augmentation of honour for the Battle of the Nations.

==== Variations ====
Lesser version (general)

Middle version (Primogeniture)

Greater version (Secundogeniture)

==== Flags ====
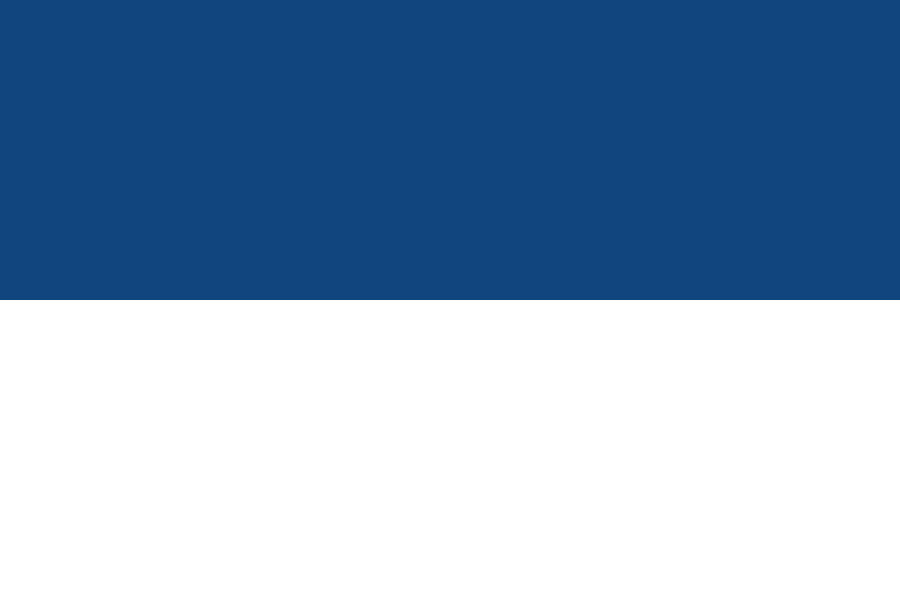
Flag

Banner of arms

=== Derivative arms ===
Traces of the Schwarzenberg family's coat of arms can be found in various district and municipal coats of arms, which can be linked to the family.

==== Germany ====
Coat of arms of the Landkreis Neustadt a.d.Aisch-Bad Windsheim

Coat of arms of the former Landkreis Scheinfeld

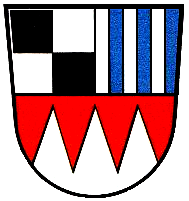
Former coat of arms of the Landkreis Kitzingen

Municipal coat of arms of Scheinfeld

Municipal coat of arms of Seinsheim

Municipal coat of arms of Marktbreit

Municipal coat of arms of Markt Nordheim

Municipal coat of arms of Martinsheim

Municipal coat of arms of Biebelried

Municipal coat of arms of Willanzheim

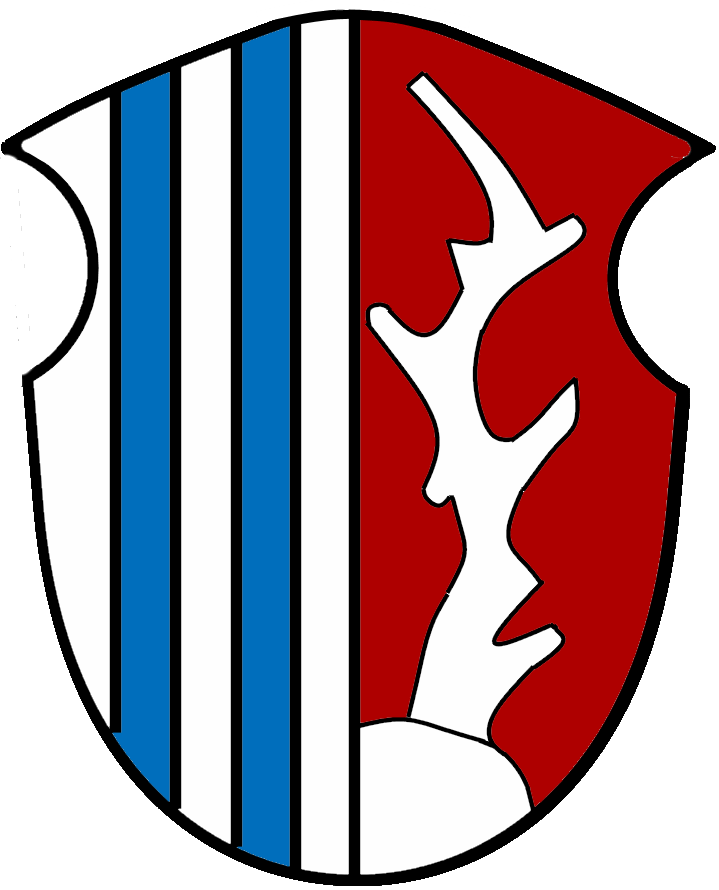
Coat of arms of the district Astheim in Volkach

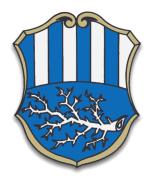
Coat of arms of the district Dornheim in Iphofen

Municipal coat of arms of Weigenheim

Municipal coat of arms of Klettgau

Municipal coat of arms of Dietingen

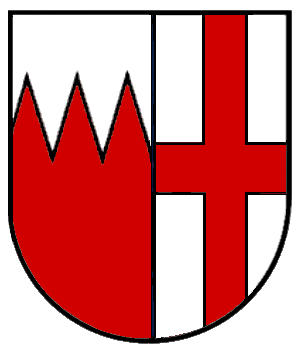
Coat of arms of the former municipality of Gößlinge

Municipal coat of arms of Hohentengen am Hochrhein

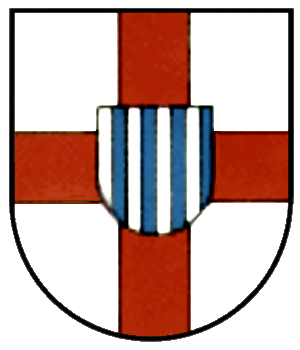
Coat of arms of the district of Bergöschingen in Hohentengen am Hochrhein

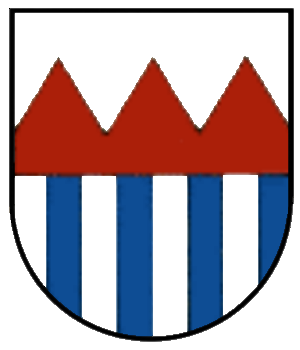
Coat of arms of the district of Stetten in Hohentengen am Hochrhein

Municipal coat of arms of Lauchringen

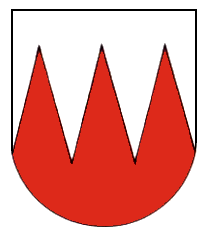
Municipal coat of arms of Oberlauchringen

Municipal coat of arms of Mötzing

Municipal coat of arms of Schnelldorf

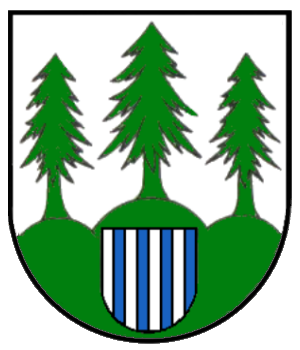
Municipal coat of arms of Degernau

Municipal coat of arms of Lottstetten

Municipal coat of arms of Iggensbach

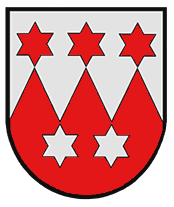
Municipal coat of arms of Dürrenmettstetten

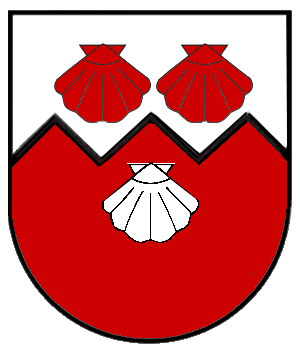
Municipal coat of arms of Sigmarswangen

Municipal coat of arms of Leinstetten

==== Czech Republic ====
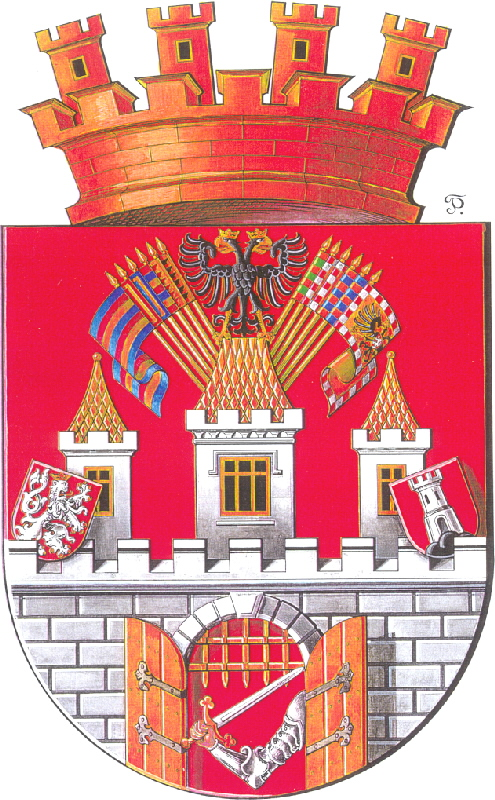
District coat of arms of Prague 5

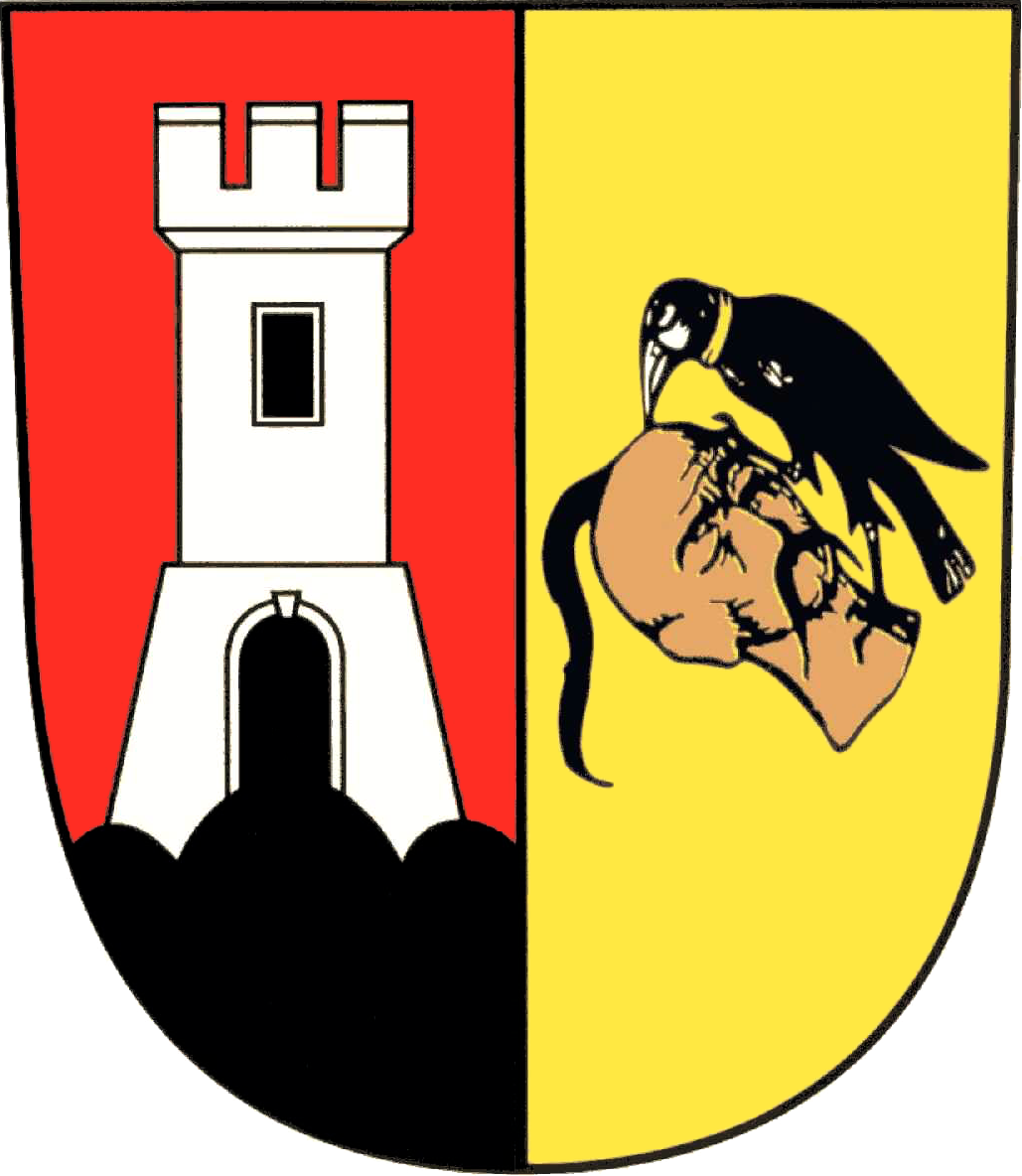
Municipal coat of arms of Orlík nad Vltavou

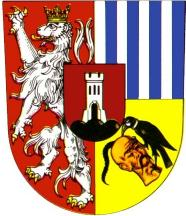
Municipal coat of arms of Protivín

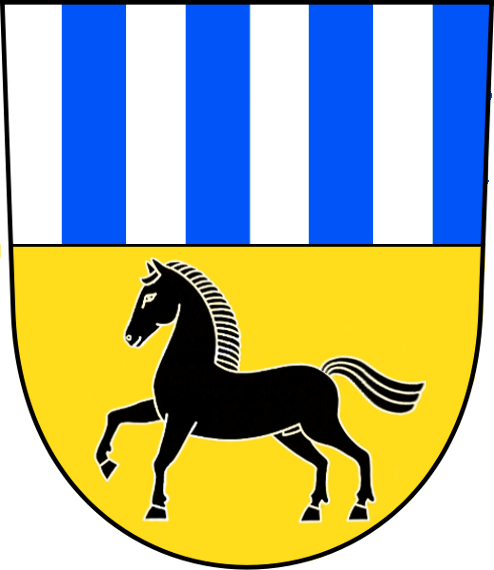
Municipal coat of arms of Tochovice

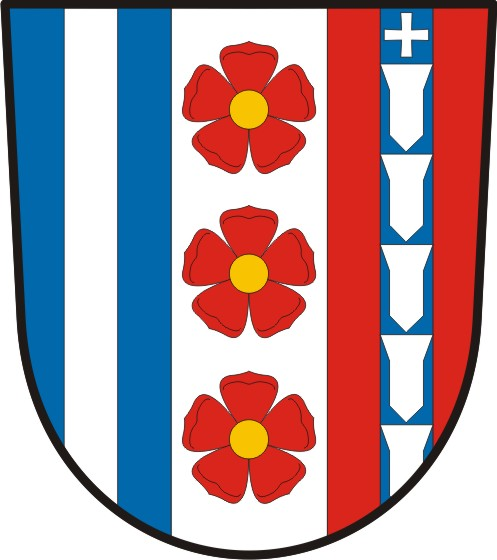
Municipal coat of arms of Libějovice

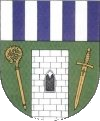
Municipal coat of arms of Zvíkovské Podhradí

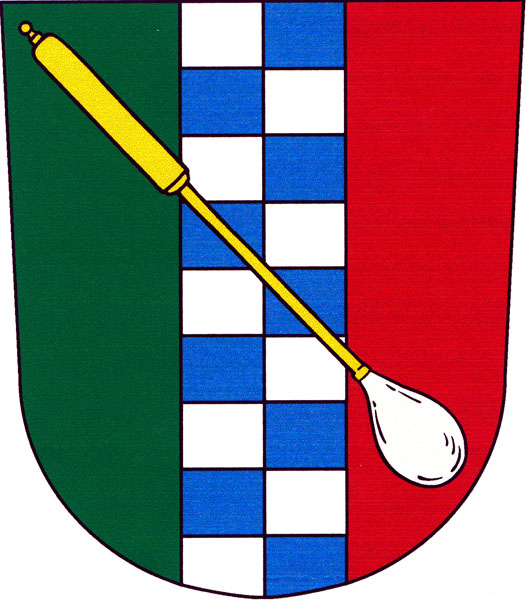
Municipal coat of arms of Modrava

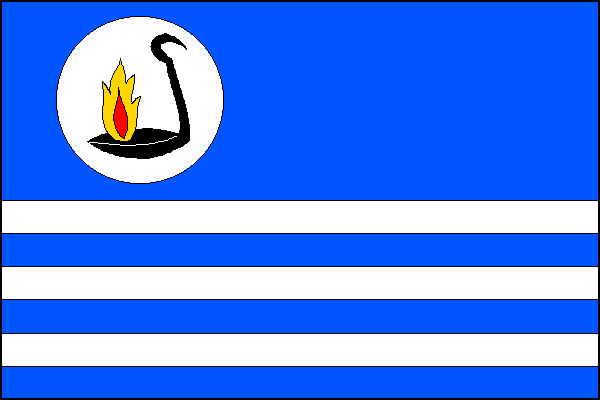
Flag of Dobrá Voda u Českých Budějovic

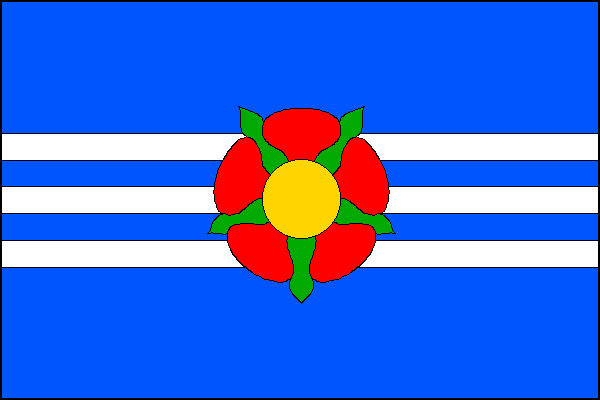
Flag of Dolní Dvořiště

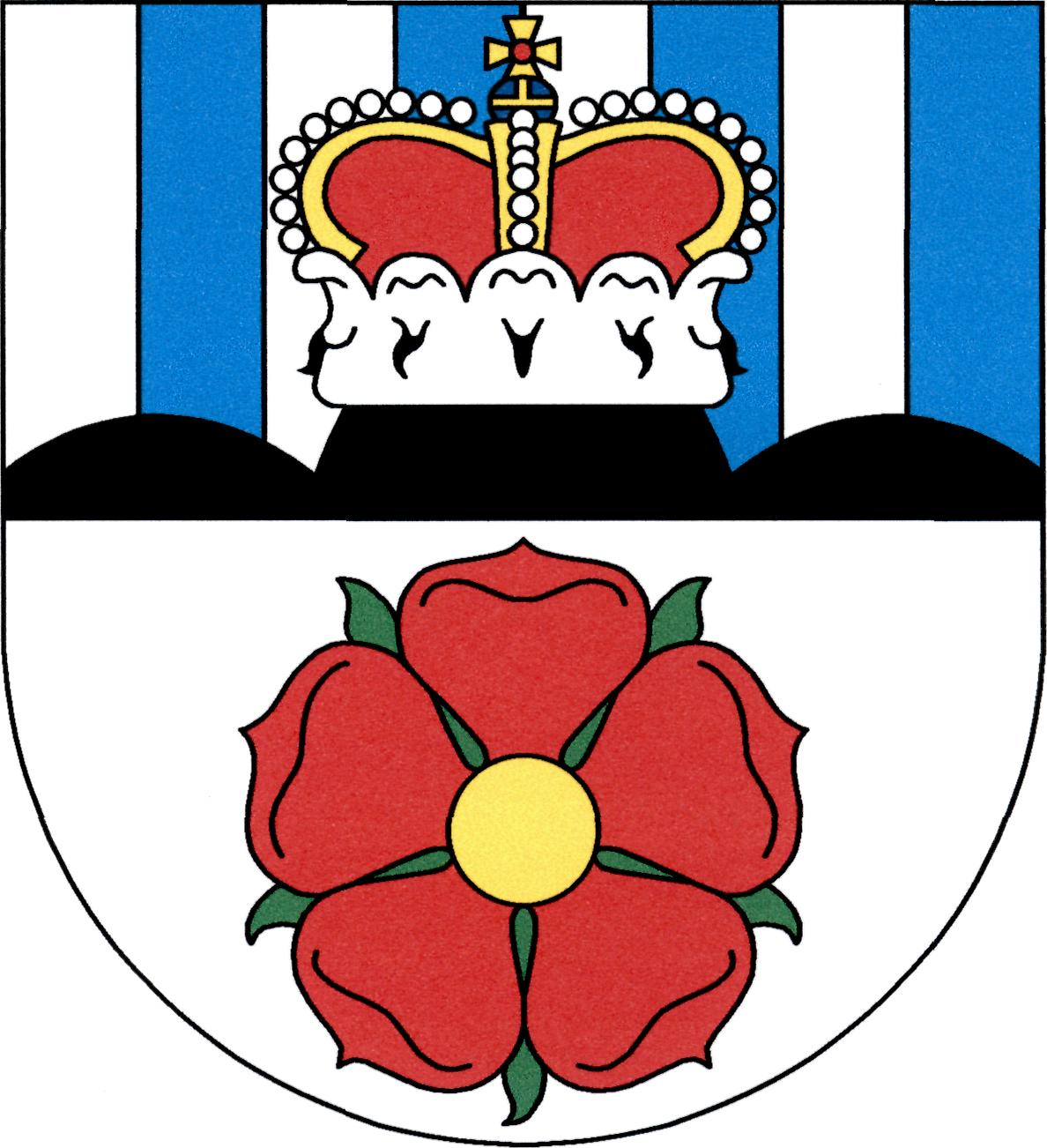
Municipal coat of arms of Domanín

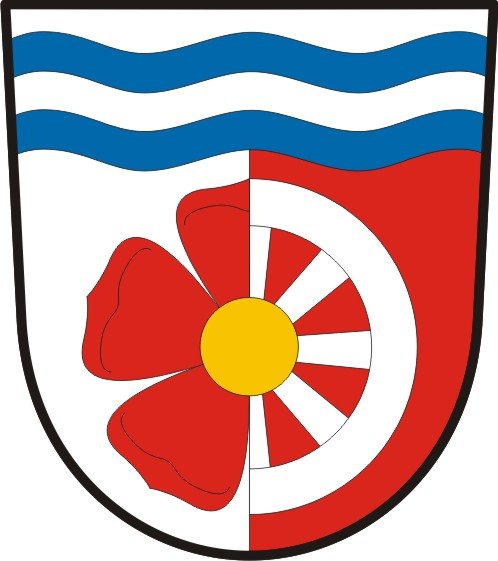
Municipal coat of arms of Doňov

Municipal coat of arms of Dynín

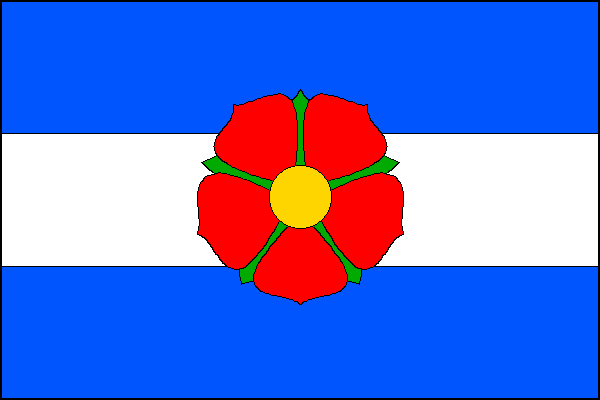
Flag of Frymburk

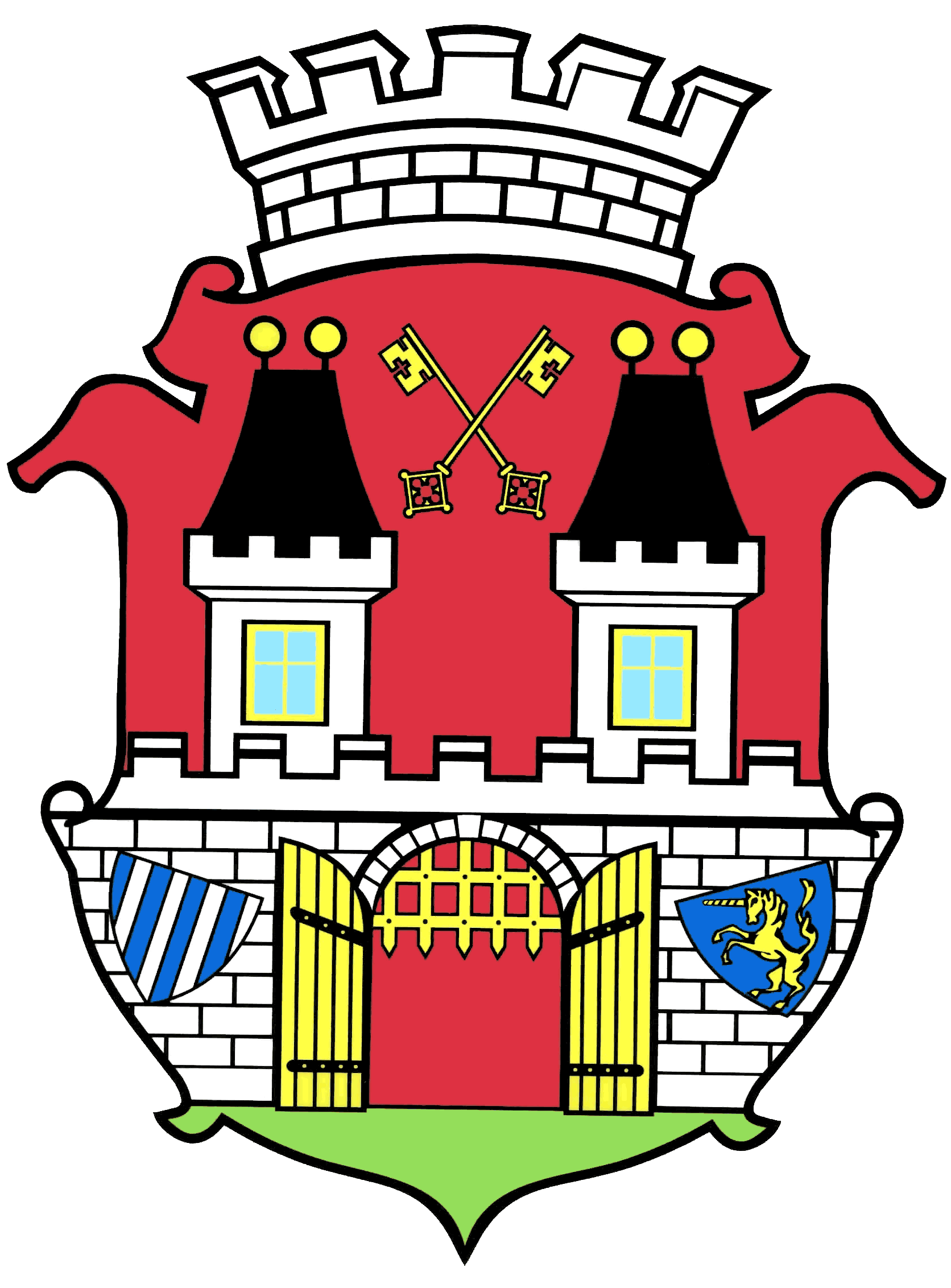
Municipal coat of arms of Chýnov

Municipal coat of arms of Lenora

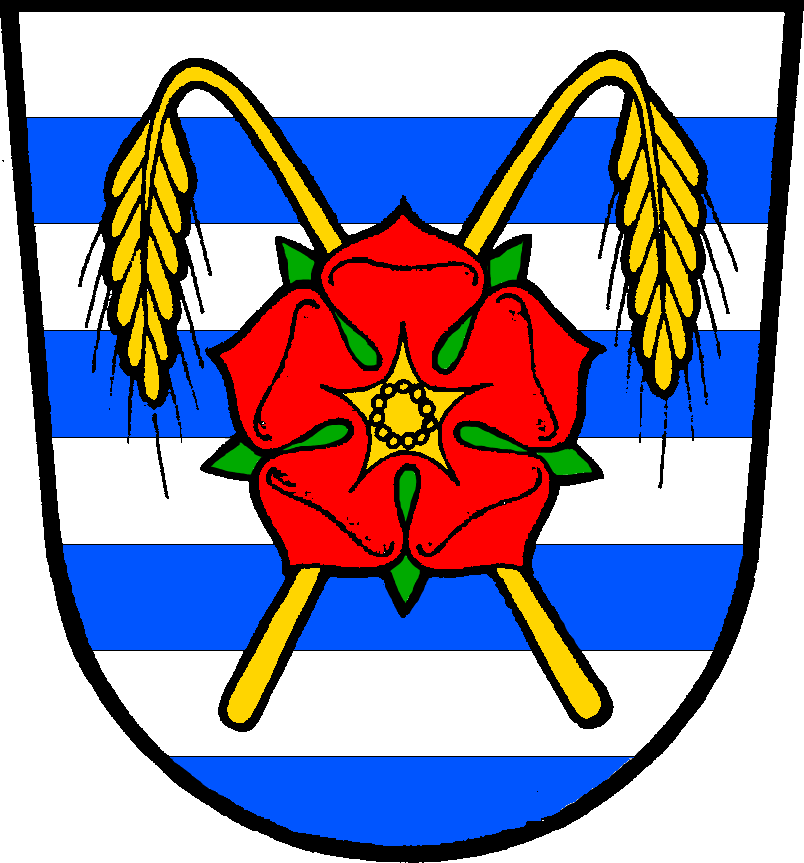
Municipal coat of arms of Neplachov

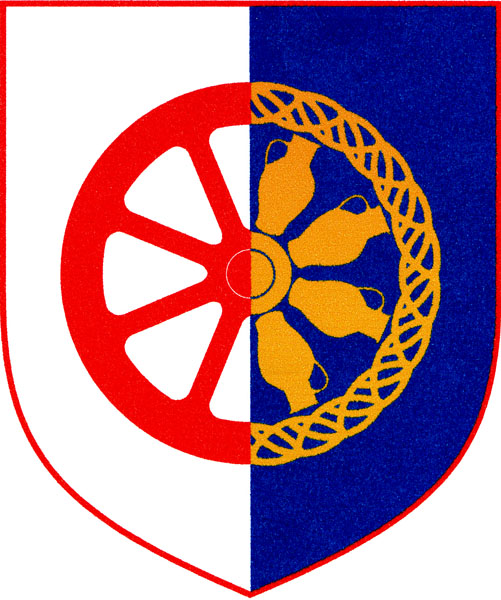
Municipal coat of arms of Nová Ves

Municipal coat of arms of Novosedly nad Nežárkou

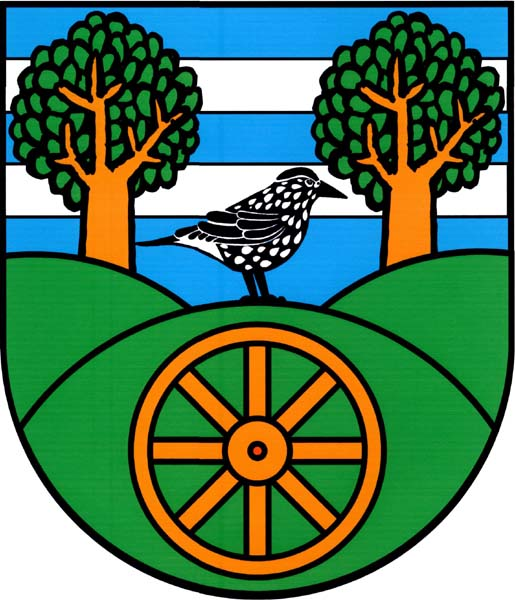
Municipal coat of arms of Paseky

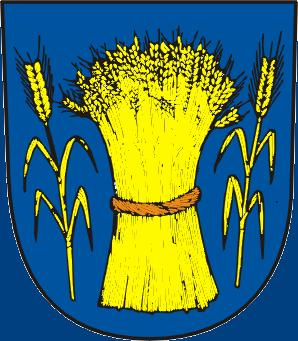
Municipal coat of arms of Mšec

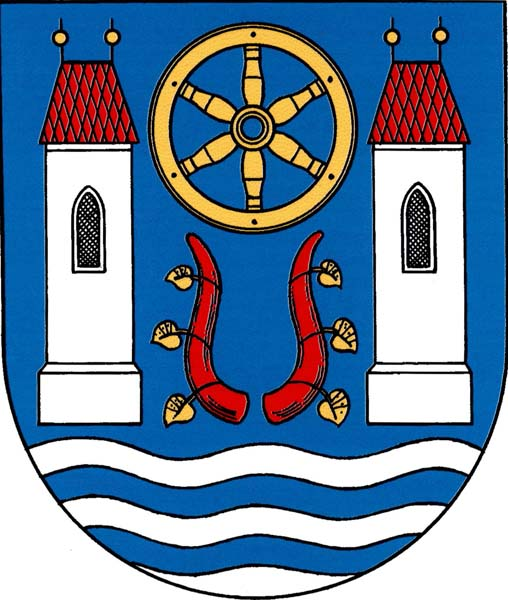
Municipal coat of arms Kestřany

Municipal coat of arms Kostelec nad Vltavou

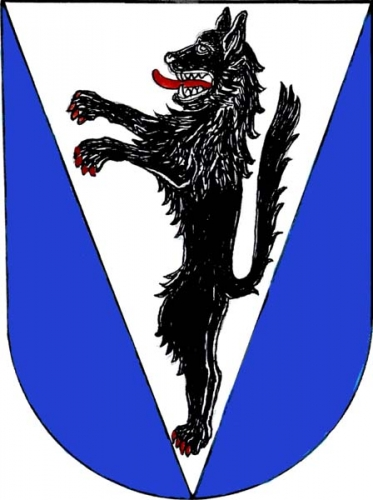
Municipal coat of arms Vlčice

==== Switzerland ====
Municipal coat of arms of Wasterkingen, Canton of Zürich

Municipal coat of arms of Rafz, Canton of Zürich

Municipal coat of arms of Hüntwangen, Canton of Zürich

Municipal coat of arms of Walterswil, Canton of Bern

Municipal coat of arms of Niederried bei Kallnach, Canton of Bern

==== Netherlands ====
Municipal coat of arms of Eanjum, Friesland

== Order of the Golden Fleece ==
The Distinguished Order of the Golden Fleece is a Catholic order of chivalry founded in 1430 in Bruges by Philip the Good, Duke of Burgundy, to celebrate his marriage to Isabella of Portugal.

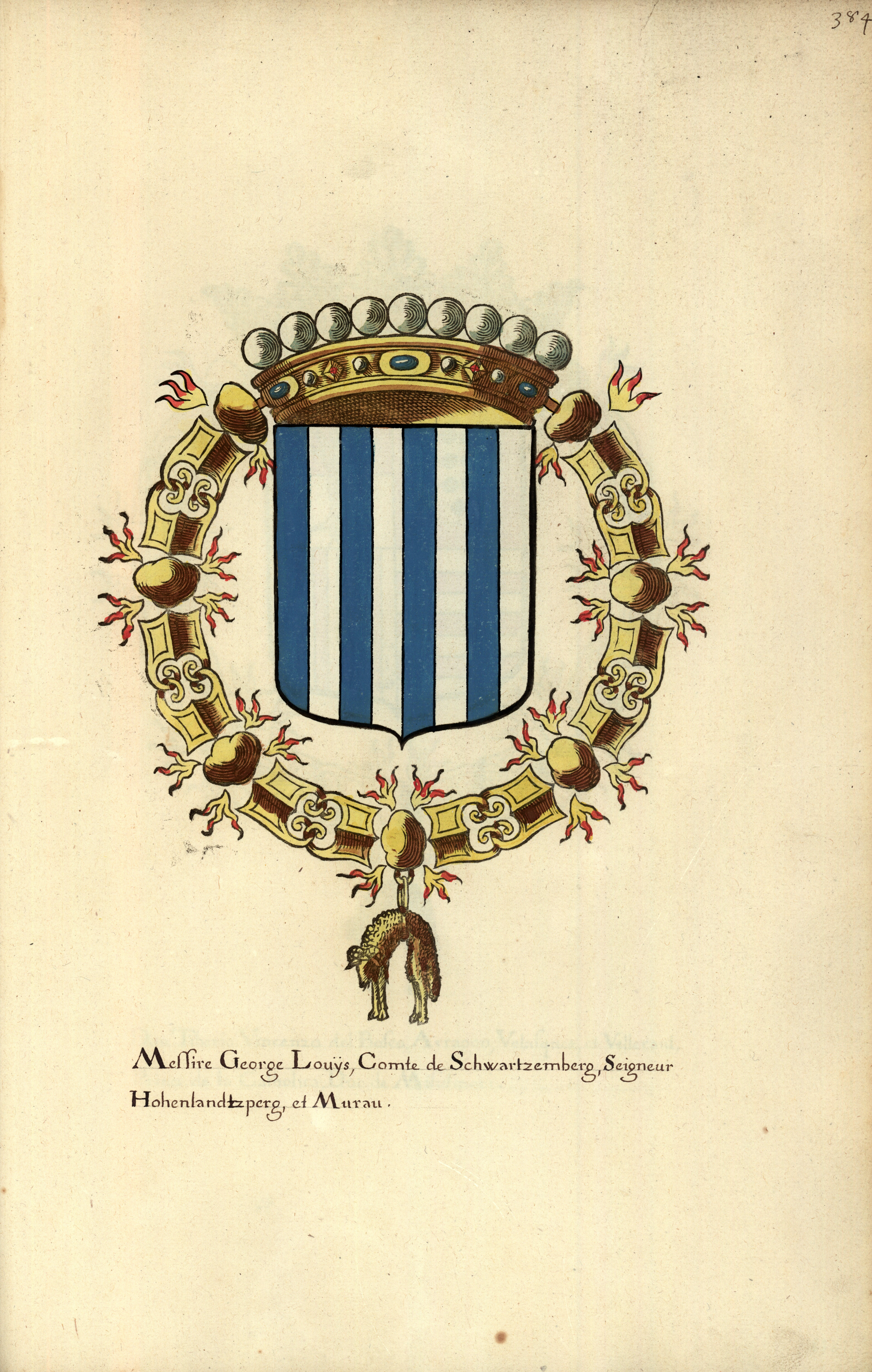
Coat of Arms of Count Georg Ludwig, first knight of the Schwarzenberg family.

Throughout the order's history, eighteen members of the Schwarzenberg family were knights of the highest order and distinction of the Habsburg empire. Their first member Georg Ludwig was admitted in 1627, while their youngest knight Joseph I. was admitted with only ten years of age, after the tragic death of his father. Twice were the Schwarzenbergs Doyen, the title of the oldest ranking member of the order: Joseph I. and Johann Adolph II.. A very rare honour was given to Field Marshal Edmund, by making a lesser born, ergo not a chief of a line, knight of the order. Six Schwarzenbergs were knighted by Emperor Franz Joseph.

No.	Name Comment	Portrait	Born	Age at Knighthood	Fleece Knight No.	Year of Knighthood	Death
1	Georg Ludwig		1586	41	365	1627	1646
2	Johann Adolph I.		1615	35	424	1650	1683
3	Ferdinand		1652	36	546	1688	1703
4	Adam Franz		1680	32	618	1712	1732
5	Joseph I. Youngest knight in the family; Doyen		1722	10	680	1732	1782
6	Johann I.		1742	40	803	1782	1789
7	Joseph II.		1769	39	864	1808	1824
8	Karl I.		1771	38	874	1809	1820
9	Johann Adolph II. Doyen		1799	37	920	1836	1888
10	Karl II.		1802	50	952	1852	1858
11	Edmund only agnate		1803	59	977	1862	1873
12	Karl III.		1824	57	1050	1881	1904
13	Adolph Joseph		1832	57	1079	1889	1914
14	Karl IV.		1859	48	1148	1907	1913
15	Johann II.		1860	55	1180	1915	1938
16	Joseph III.		1900	51	1239	1951	1979
17	Karl VI.		1911	49	1265	1960	1986
18	Karl VII. Johannes		1937	54	1309	1991	2023
19	Ferdinand		1989	35	1358	2024	

Order of The Golden Fleece
Philip the Good
Philip the Handsome
Karl V.
Philipp II.
Philipp III.
Philipp IV.
Karl II.
Karl VI.
Franz I.
Joseph II.
Franz II./I.
Franz Joseph I.
Otto
Karl
Georg Ludwig
Johann Adolph I.
Ferdinand
Adam Franz
Joseph I.
Johann I.
Joseph II.
Johann Adolph II.
Adolph Joseph
Johann II.
Joseph III.
Karl VII. Johannes
Ferdinand
Karl I.
Karl II.
Edmund
Karl III.
Karl IV.
Karl VI.
│
1430
│
1530
│
1630
│
1730
│
1830
│
1930
│
2030
Timeline of
The Order of The Golden Fleece 1430 - 2030
showing its
Sovereigns and Schwarzenberg Knights

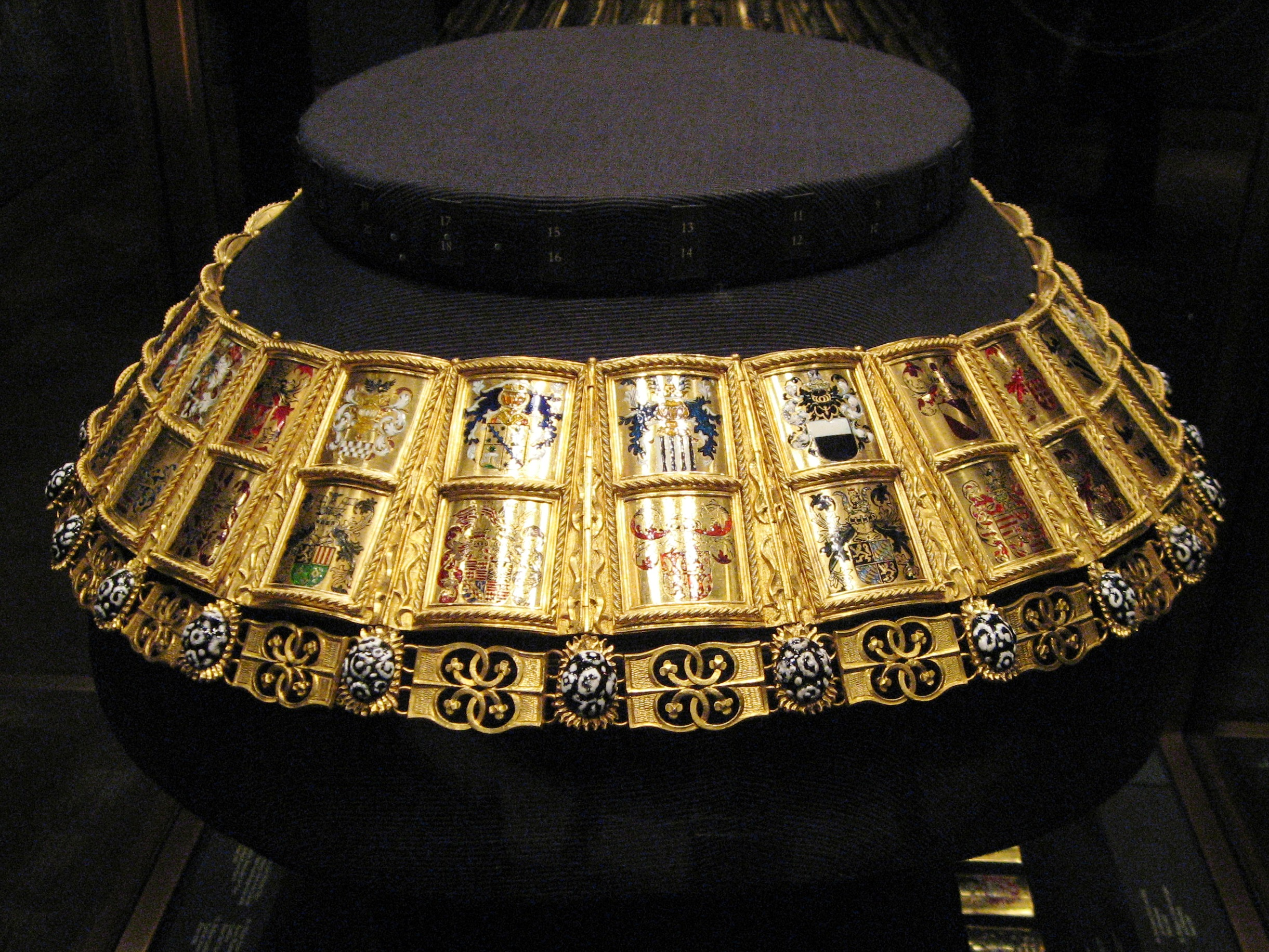
Potence of the Herald of the Order of the Golden Fleece with Schwarzenberg Coat of Arms in the centre top
