= Seinsheim =

- Municipality
- Coat of arms

- Location of Seinsheim within Kitzingen district
- Interactive map of Seinsheim
- Location within Germany Location within Bavaria
- Coordinates: 49°37′N 10°13′E
- Country: Germany
- State: Bavaria
- Admin. region: Unterfranken
- District: Kitzingen
- Municipal assoc.: Marktbreit

Government
  - Mayor (2020–26): Ruth Albrecht

Area
  - Total: 17.52 km^{2} (6.76 sq mi)
- Elevation: 252 m (827 ft)

Population (2025-12-31)
  - Total: 1,046
  - Density: 59.70/km^{2} (154.6/sq mi)
- Time zone: UTC+01:00 (CET)
  - Summer (DST): UTC+02:00 (CEST)
- Postal codes: 97342
- Dialling codes: 09332
- Vehicle registration: KT
- Website: www.seinsheim.de

Seinsheim is a municipality in the district of Kitzingen in Bavaria in Germany. It is best known for its connection with the comital Seinsheim family (german), which died out in 1958 except for the princely House of Schwarzenberg branch of the family.

== Mayor ==
Since 2020: Ruth Albrecht (born 1970)
