= Sýkořice =

- Municipality
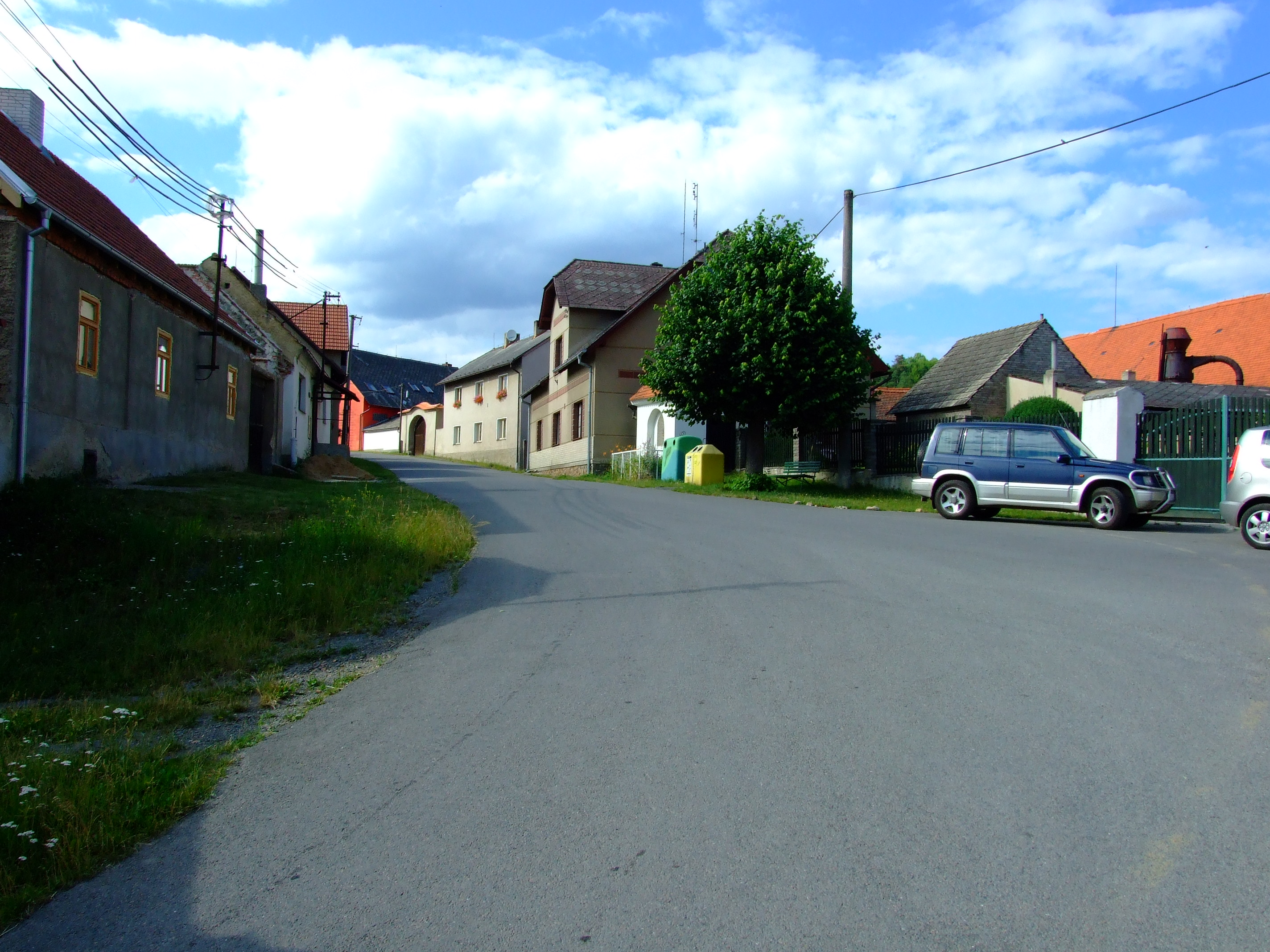
- Southern part of Sýkořice

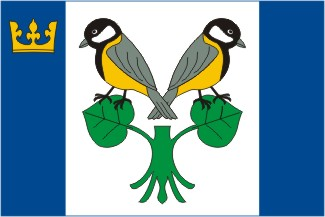
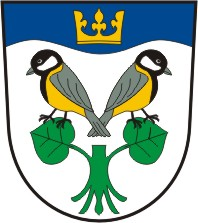
- Flag Coat of arms

- Location in the Czech Republic
- Coordinates: 50°2′5″N 13°55′54″E
- Country: Czech Republic
- Region: Central Bohemian
- District: Rakovník
- First mentioned: 1581

Area
  - Total: 15.85 km^{2} (6.12 sq mi)
- Elevation: 352 m (1,155 ft)

Population (2026-01-01)
  - Total: 587
  - Density: 37.0/km^{2} (95.9/sq mi)
- Time zone: UTC+1 (CET)
  - Summer (DST): UTC+2 (CEST)
- Postal code: 270 24
- Website: www.sykorice.cz

Sýkořice is a municipality and village in Rakovník District in the Central Bohemian Region of the Czech Republic. It has about 600 inhabitants.

== Demographics ==
Historical population
Year	Pop.	±%
1869	437	—
1880	418	−4.3%
1890	379	−9.3%
1900	390	+2.9%
1910	420	+7.7%
1921	376	−10.5%
1930	395	+5.1%
1950	319	−19.2%
1961	664	+108.2%
1970	585	−11.9%
1980	472	−19.3%
1991	416	−11.9%
2001	416	+0.0%
2011	487	+17.1%
2021	575	+18.1%
Source: Censuses
