= Starosedlský Hrádek =

- Municipality
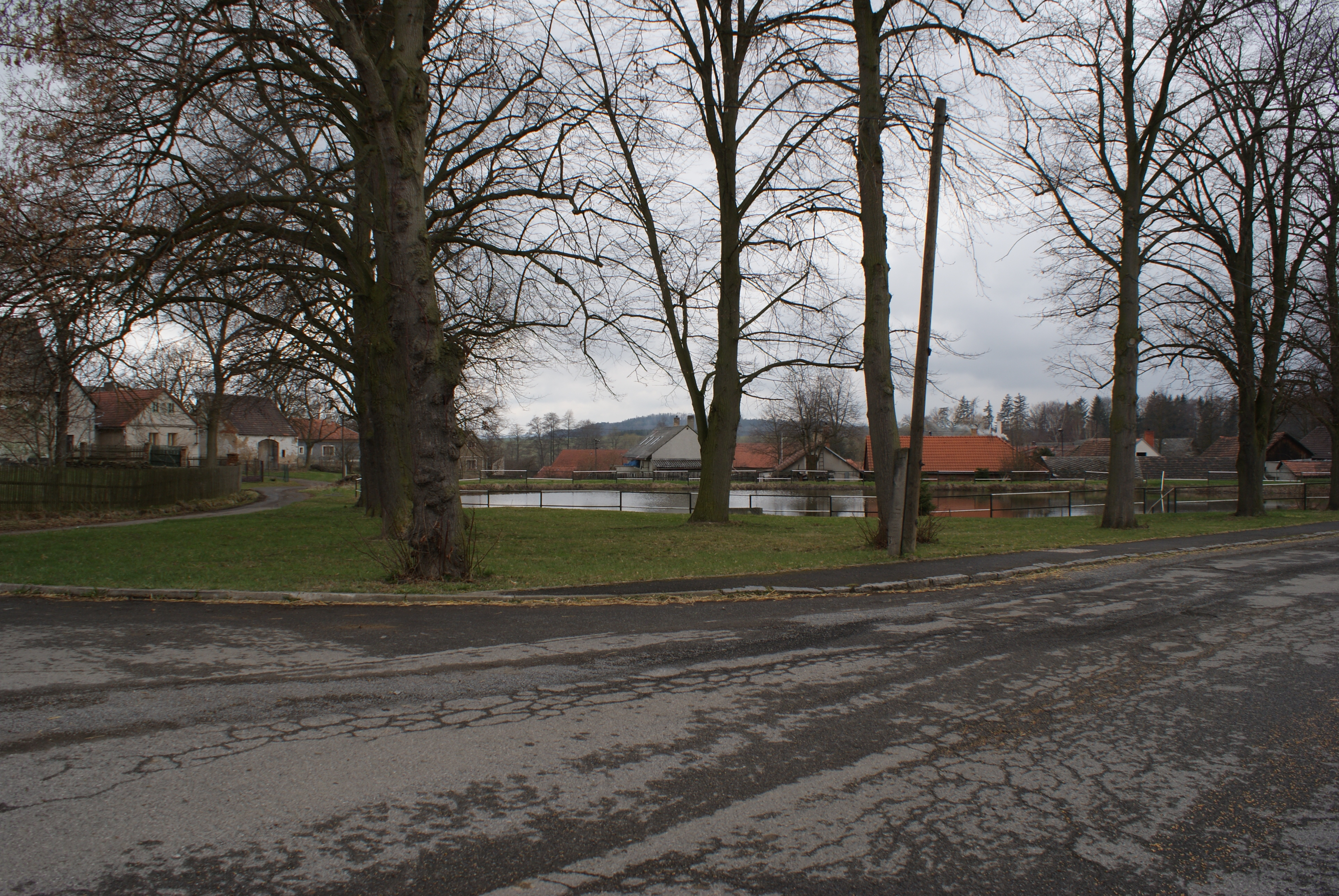
- Centre of Starosedlský Hrádek

- Flag Coat of arms

- Location in the Czech Republic
- Coordinates: 49°34′35″N 14°0′30″E
- Country: Czech Republic
- Region: Central Bohemian
- District: Příbram
- First mentioned: 1376

Area
  - Total: 4.22 km^{2} (1.63 sq mi)
- Elevation: 470 m (1,540 ft)

Population (2026-01-01)
  - Total: 147
  - Density: 34.8/km^{2} (90.2/sq mi)
- Time zone: UTC+1 (CET)
  - Summer (DST): UTC+2 (CEST)
- Postal code: 262 72
- Website: www.starosedlskyhradek.cz

Starosedlský Hrádek is a municipality and village in Příbram District in the Central Bohemian Region of the Czech Republic. It has about 100 inhabitants.

== Demographics ==
Historical population
Year	Pop.	±%
1869	368	—
1880	401	+9.0%
1890	357	−11.0%
1900	368	+3.1%
1910	336	−8.7%
1921	316	−6.0%
1930	256	−19.0%
1950	206	−19.5%
1961	208	+1.0%
1970	200	−3.8%
1980	182	−9.0%
1991	160	−12.1%
2001	143	−10.6%
2011	124	−13.3%
2021	130	+4.8%
Source: Censuses
