= Klosterneuburg =

- Municipality
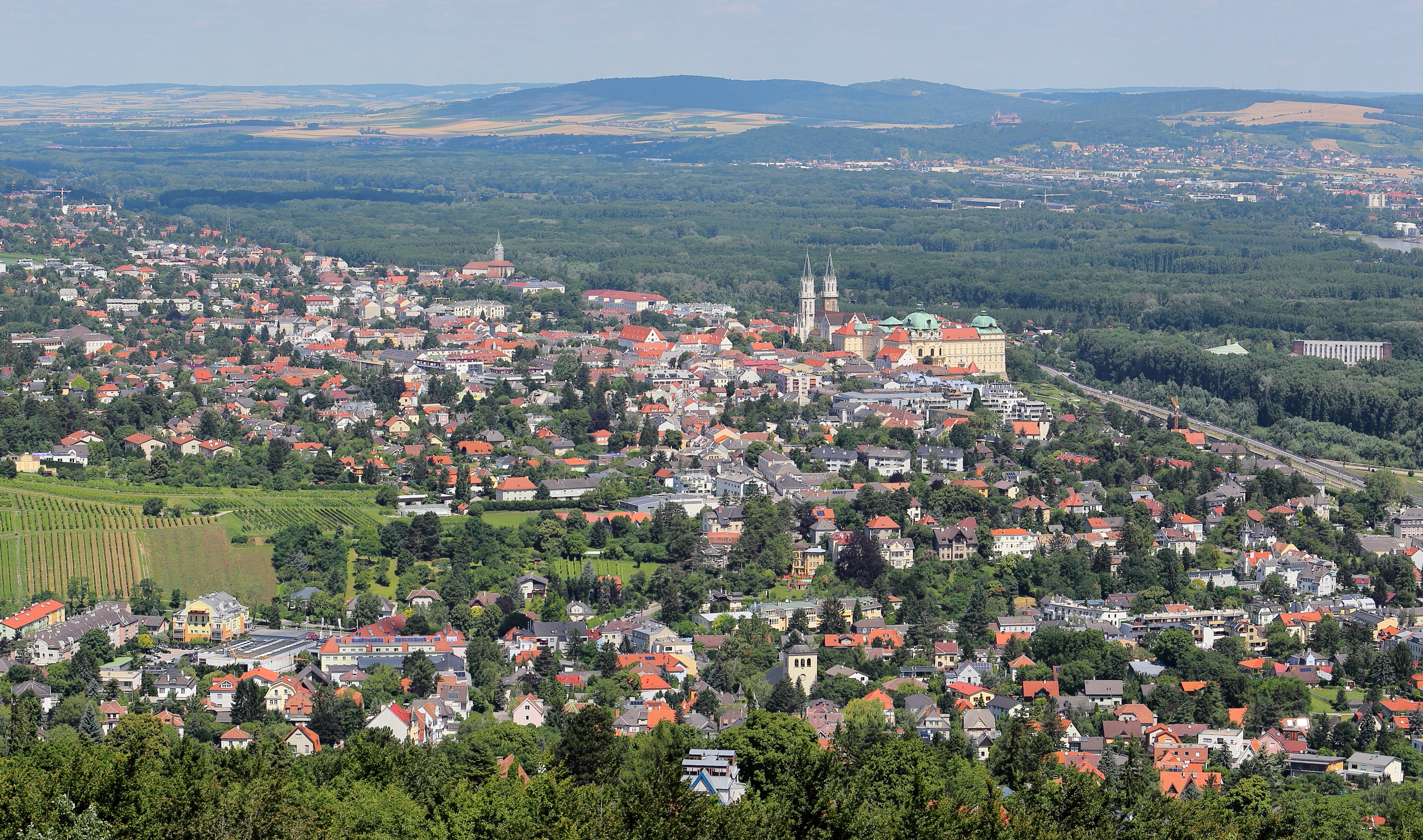

- Flag Coat of arms

- Location within Austria Klosterneuburg (Lower Austria)
- Coordinates: 48°18′15″N 16°19′00″E
- Country: Austria
- State: Lower Austria
- District: Tulln

Government
  - Mayor: Christoph Kaufmann (ÖVP)

Area
  - Total: 76.2 km^{2} (29.4 sq mi)
- Elevation: 192 m (630 ft)

Population (2018-01-01)
  - Total: 27,058
  - Density: 355/km^{2} (920/sq mi)
- Time zone: UTC+1 (CET)
  - Summer (DST): UTC+2 (CEST)
- Postal code: 340x
- Area code: 02243
- Vehicle registration: KG
- Website: www.klosterneuburg.at

Klosterneuburg (German pronunciation: [kloːstɐˈnɔɪ̯bʊʁk]) is a town in the Tulln District of the Austrian state of Lower Austria. Frequently abbreviated to Kloburg by locals, it has a population of about 27,500. The Stift Klosterneuburg (Klosterneuburg Monastery), which was established in 1114 and soon after given to the Augustinians, is of particular historical importance.

== Geography ==
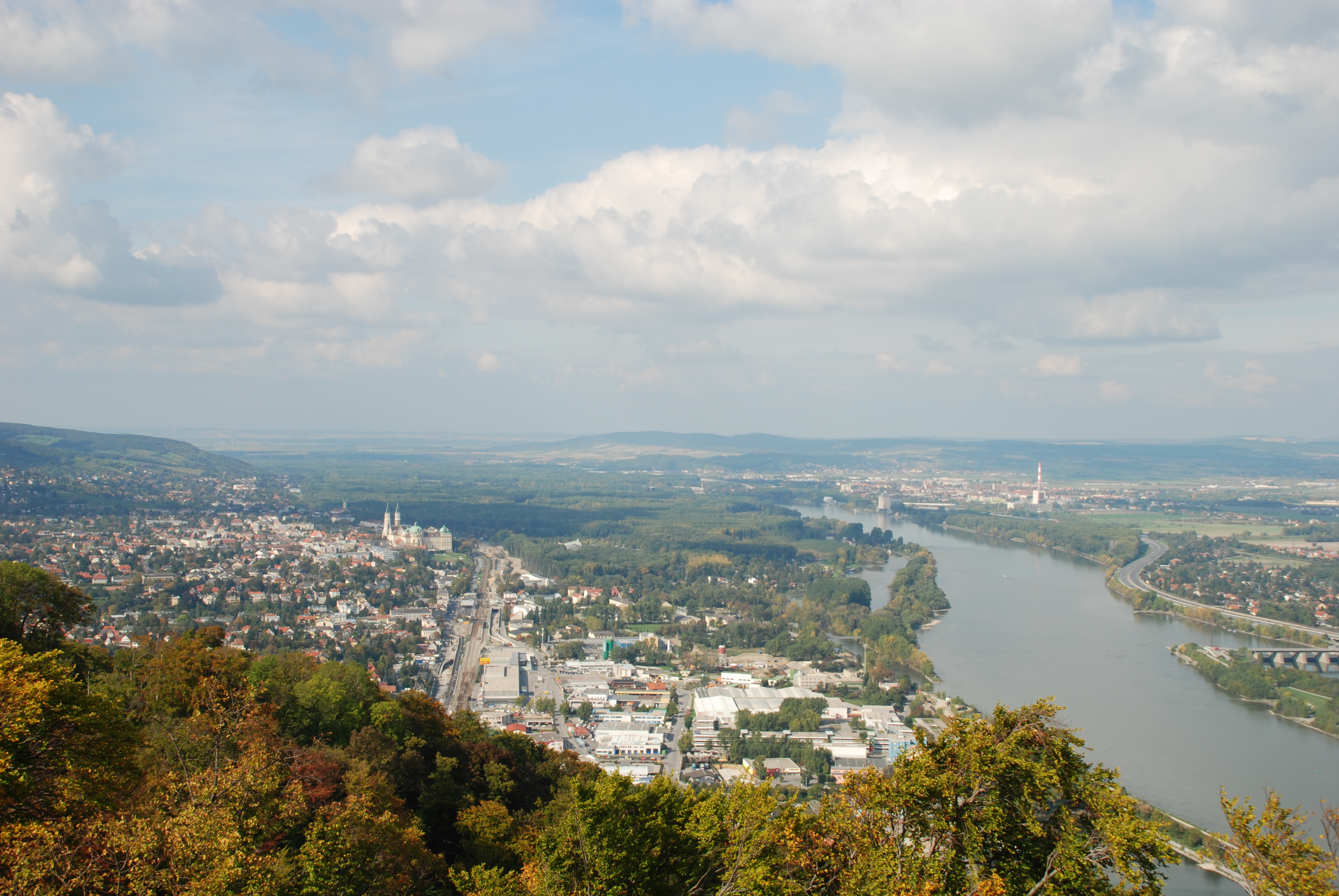
Klosterneuburg and Korneuburg (background), view from Leopoldsberg

Klosterneuburg is located on the Danube, immediately north of the Austrian capital Vienna, from which it is separated by the Kahlenberg and Leopoldsberg hills of the Vienna Woods range. It has been separated from its twin city of Korneuburg on the opposite bank of the Danube since the river changed course during the Late Middle Ages. The towns are connected by a reaction ferry link which runs during daylight hours from Spring to late Autumn. The municipal area comprises the northern tip of the Donauinsel as well as the 515 m (1,690 ft) high Mt. Exelberg and its telecommunication tower.

On the site of a former pioneer school of the Austrian Army Austrian Bundesheer are a variety of buildings due to be developed into a 12-hectare new town quarter by 2030. Klosterneuburg is also the centre of a wine growing area, with several esteemed vintners, numerous Heuriger wine taverns and the Federal Institute for Viticulture and Pomology Weinbauschule, where Fritz Zweigelt bred the Zweigelt and Blauburger red wine grapes.

Due to its hilly location, Klosterneuburg consists of several geographical areas within the cadastral communities of Klosterneuburg-Stadt, Maria Gugging, Höflein an der Donau, Kierling, Kritzendorf, Weidling, and Weidlingbach. Its town centre has two main shopping areas - the Stadtplatz/Niedermarkt and the Rathausplatz - which are separated by a steep hill.

The town is tightly linked to the Austrian capital and is thought to be home to some of Lower Austria's most affluent citizens. It has direct access to Vienna via the Klosterneuburger Straße highway (B14), the Vienna S-Bahn network running on the Emperor Franz Joseph Railway line (S40) from Franz-Josefs-Bahnhof to Tulln, and along the EV6 The Rivers cycle route. The town is the site of light industry and, while not belonging to Vienna, has almost the feel of a suburb. From 1938 to 1954, indeed, Klosterneuburg was designated as Vienna's 26th district and in more recent times, it has been suggested that Klosterneuburg should become part of Vienna once more. The Albertina Klosterneuburg and the Institute of Science and Technology Austria, established in 2006, are located in the town.

== History ==
Archaeological findings denote a settlement of the area already during the Neolithic period. In the Roman era (1st to 5th centuries), a fort of the Danubian limes stood at the site of Klosterneuburg on the northwestern border of the Pannonia. After Charlemagne had defeated the Avars, a Carolingian settlement in the newly established Avar March recorded as Omundesdorf may correspond to the site of the town. Klosterneuburg itself was first mentioned as Nivvenburc (Neuburg, "New Castle") in an 1108 deed.

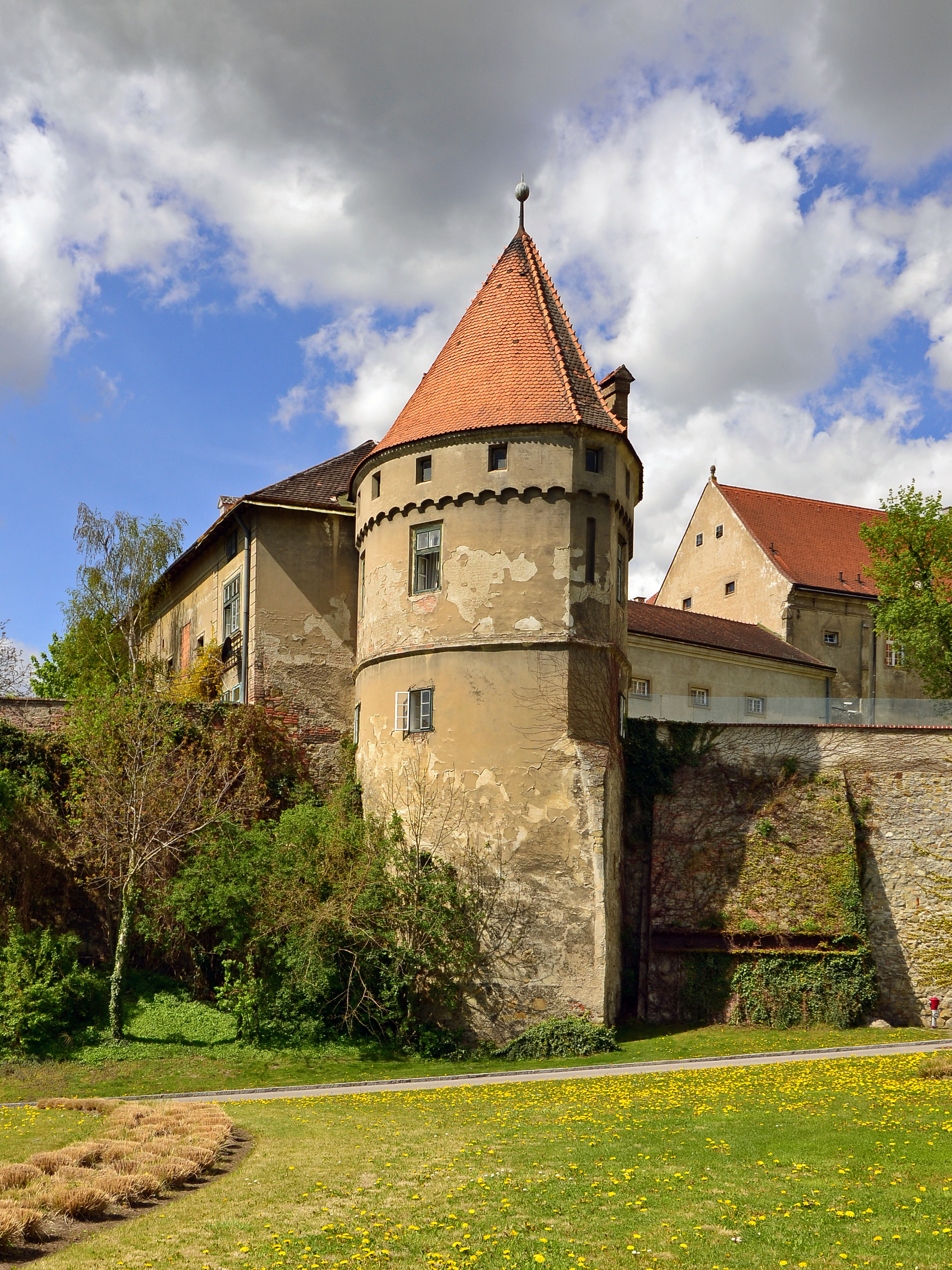
Monastery and town walls

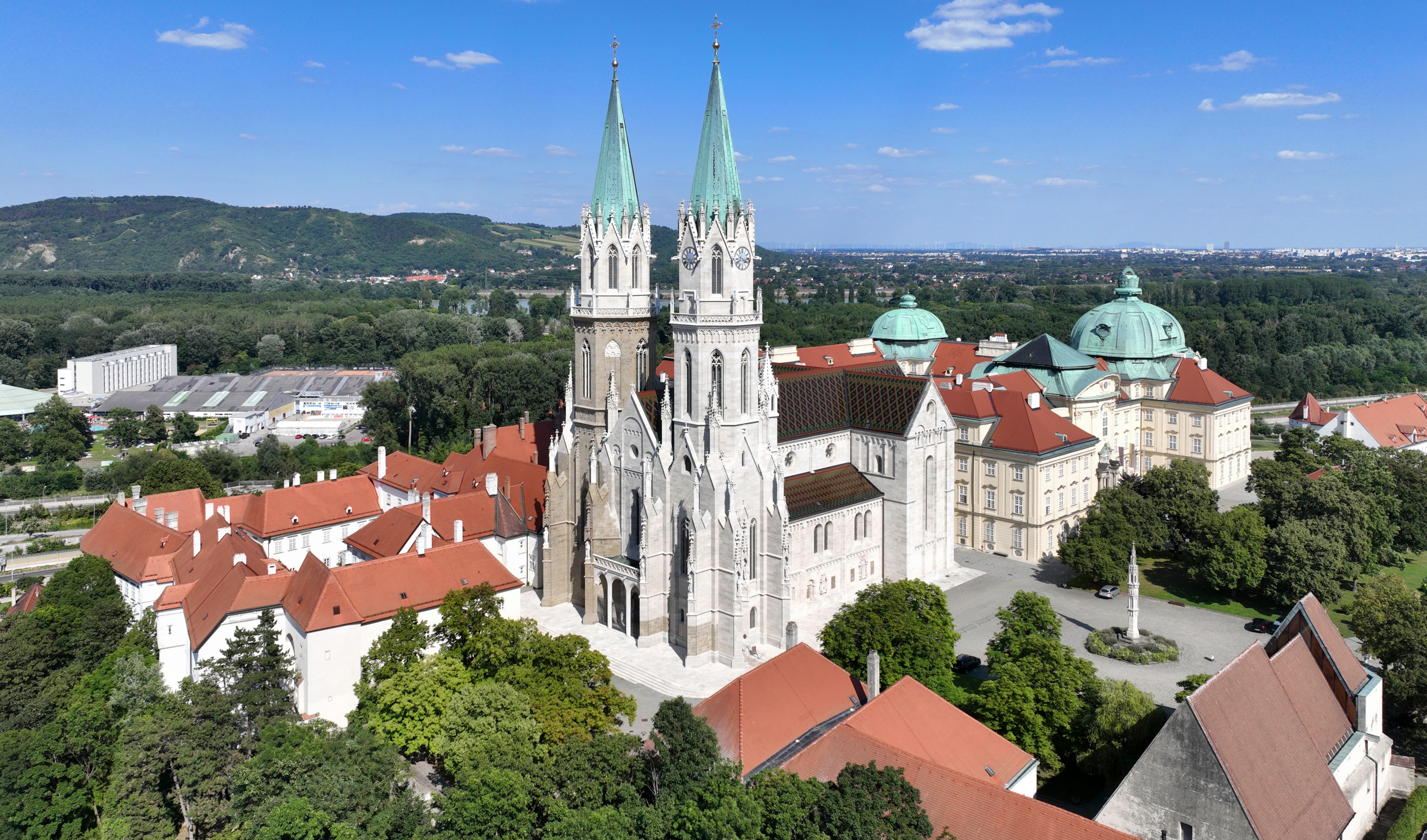
Aerial view of Klosterneuburg Abbey

In 1113 it became the residence[after Melk] of the Babenberg margrave Leopold III, the later patron saint of Austria. In 1114 Leopold, son-in-law of the Salian emperor Henry IV by his marriage with Agnes of Wailingen, had a princely castle erected together with a collegiate church on a hill rising directly from the banks of the Danube, which he transferred to Augustinian canons in 1133. This order is one of the oldest and richest of its kind in Austria; it owned much of the land upon which today the north-western suburbs of Vienna stand. Later, Duke Leopold VI of Austria (d. 1230) also had his residence there during parts of his reign. It was also here where Leopold VI's eldest son climbed a tree, fell and died. The monastery complex include the old chapel of 1318, with Leopold's tomb and the Verdun Altar, dating from the 12th century, the treasury and relic-chamber, the library with 30,000 volumes and numerous manuscripts, the picture gallery, the collection of coins, the theological hall, and the winecellar, containing an immense tun like that at Heidelberg.

The market on the left river bank quickly developed in conjunction with the famous monastery on the right bank. While the Danube was an important waterway trade route, it also repeatedly affected the citizens by floods. In the late 13th century, the two parts of the town, Klosterneuburg (the monastery) and Korneuburg (the market), had grown apart, whereafter the Habsburg king Albert I of Germany granted separate town privileges to Klosterneuburg in 1298.

The unfortified "Untere Stadt" was devastated by Ottoman forces in the 1529 Siege of Vienna and the 1683 Battle of Vienna whereas the fortified "Obere Stadt" was successfully defended in both cases. In the 18th century Emperor Charles VI, who could not prevail in the War of the Spanish Succession, set up plans to rebuild the Klosterneuburg monastery complex modelled on the Escorial. The construction of the Baroque buildings began in 1730; however, it did not survive an initial phase.

After the Austrian defeat in the 1805 Battle of Austerlitz, the town was occupied by Napoleonic troops until 1809. A winemaker's town during the 19th century, Klosterneuburg developed to a recreational and residential area of Austrian officials working in the nearby capital. During the Anschluss of Austria to Nazi Germany from 1938, Klosterneuburg was incorporated as the 26th district of "Greater Vienna", which was reversed with the establishment of Wien-Umgebung District in 1954.

At the end of 2016 Wien-Umgebung District was dissolved and Klosterneuburg became a part of Tulln.

== Politics ==
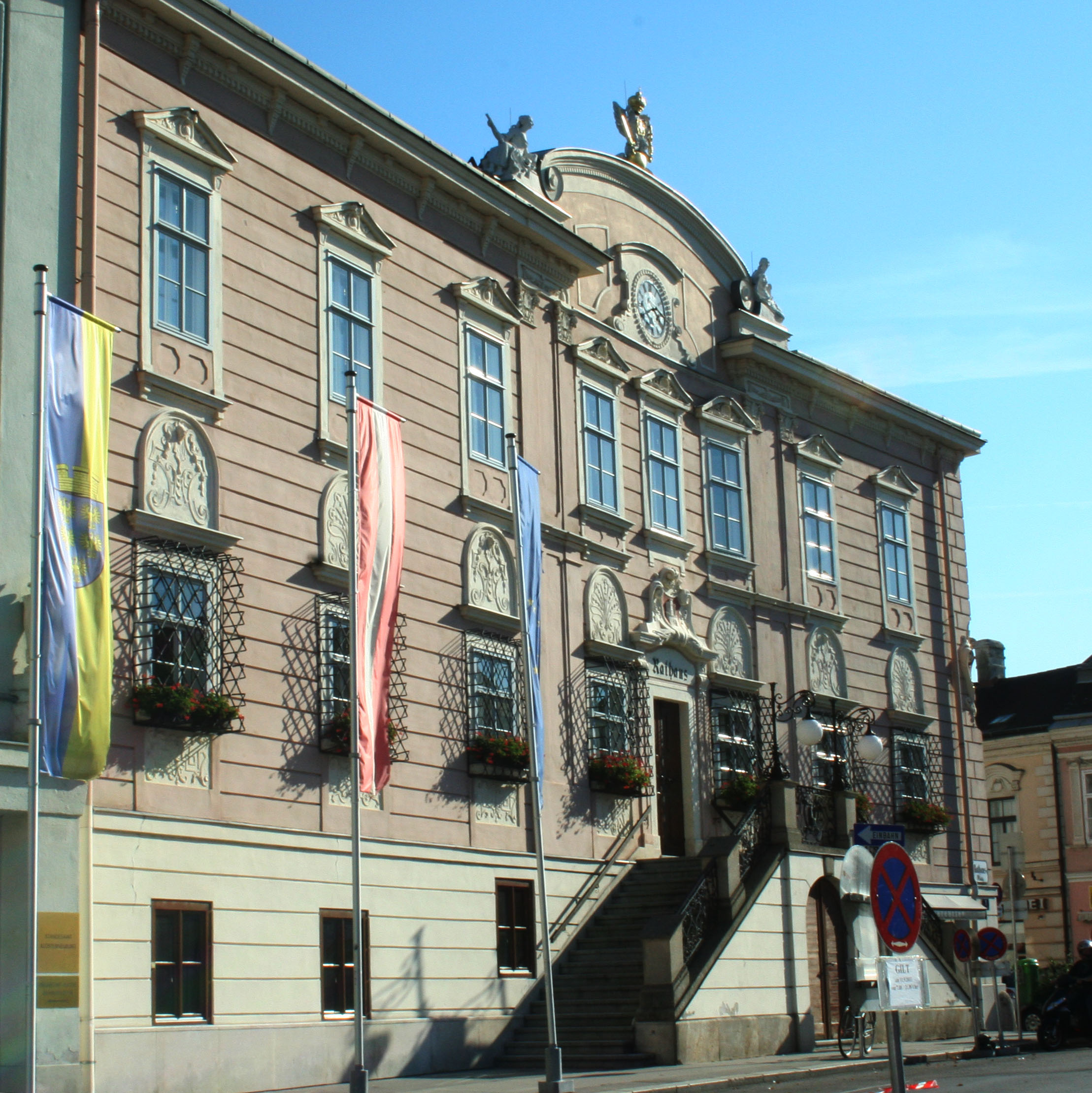
Town hall

Seats in the town's assembly (Gemeinderat) as of 2025 local elections:

- Austrian People's Party (ÖVP): 17
- The Greens – The Green Alternative: 6
- NEOS – The New Austria and Liberal Forum (NEOS): 5
- Freedom Party of Austria (FPÖ): 5
- Social Democratic Party of Austria (SPÖ): 4
- Plattform Unser Klosterneuburg (Independent): 4

== Twin town ==
Klosterneuburg is twinned with:

- Göppingen, Germany, since 1971

== Notable people ==
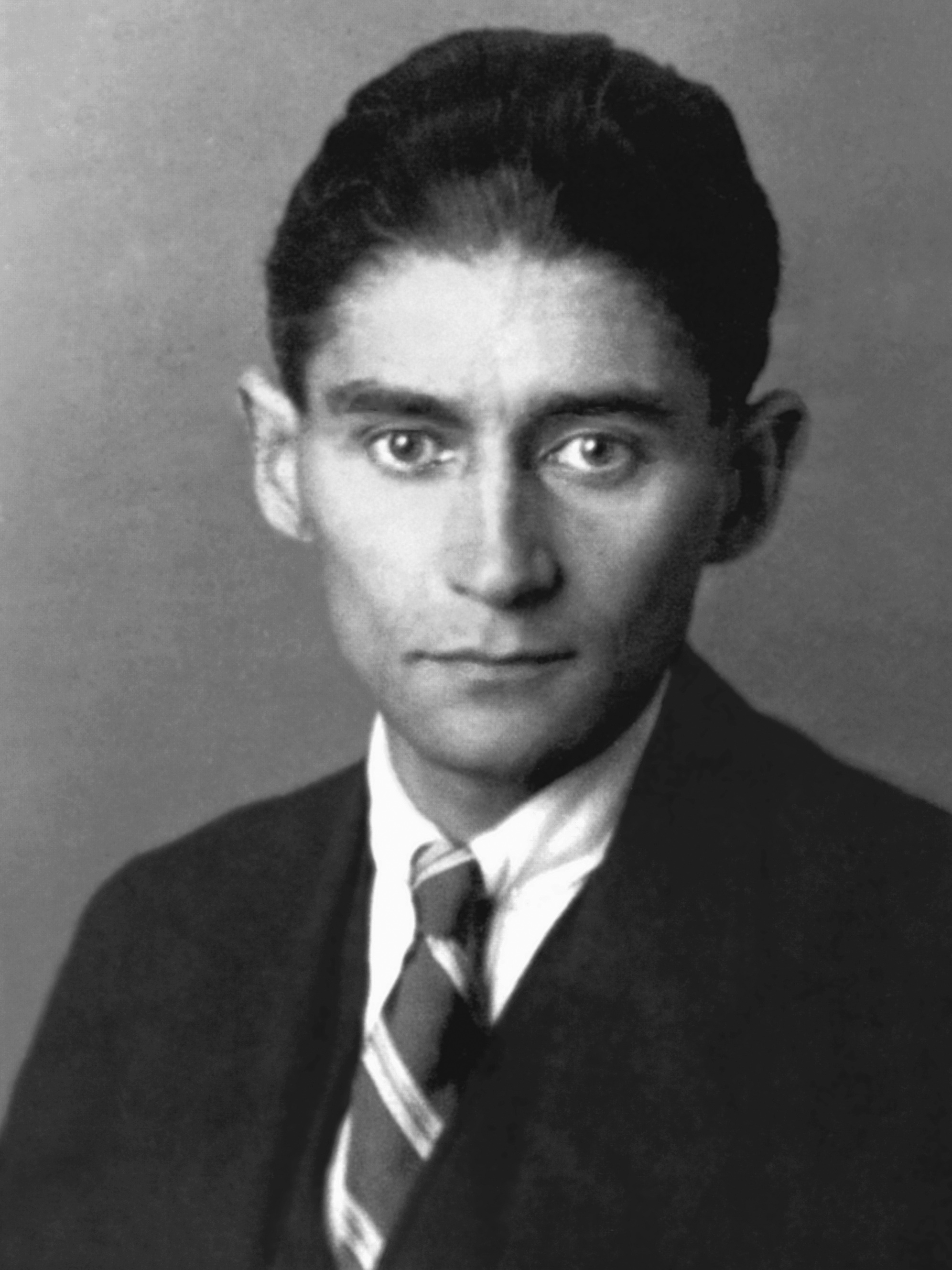
Franz Kafka, 1923

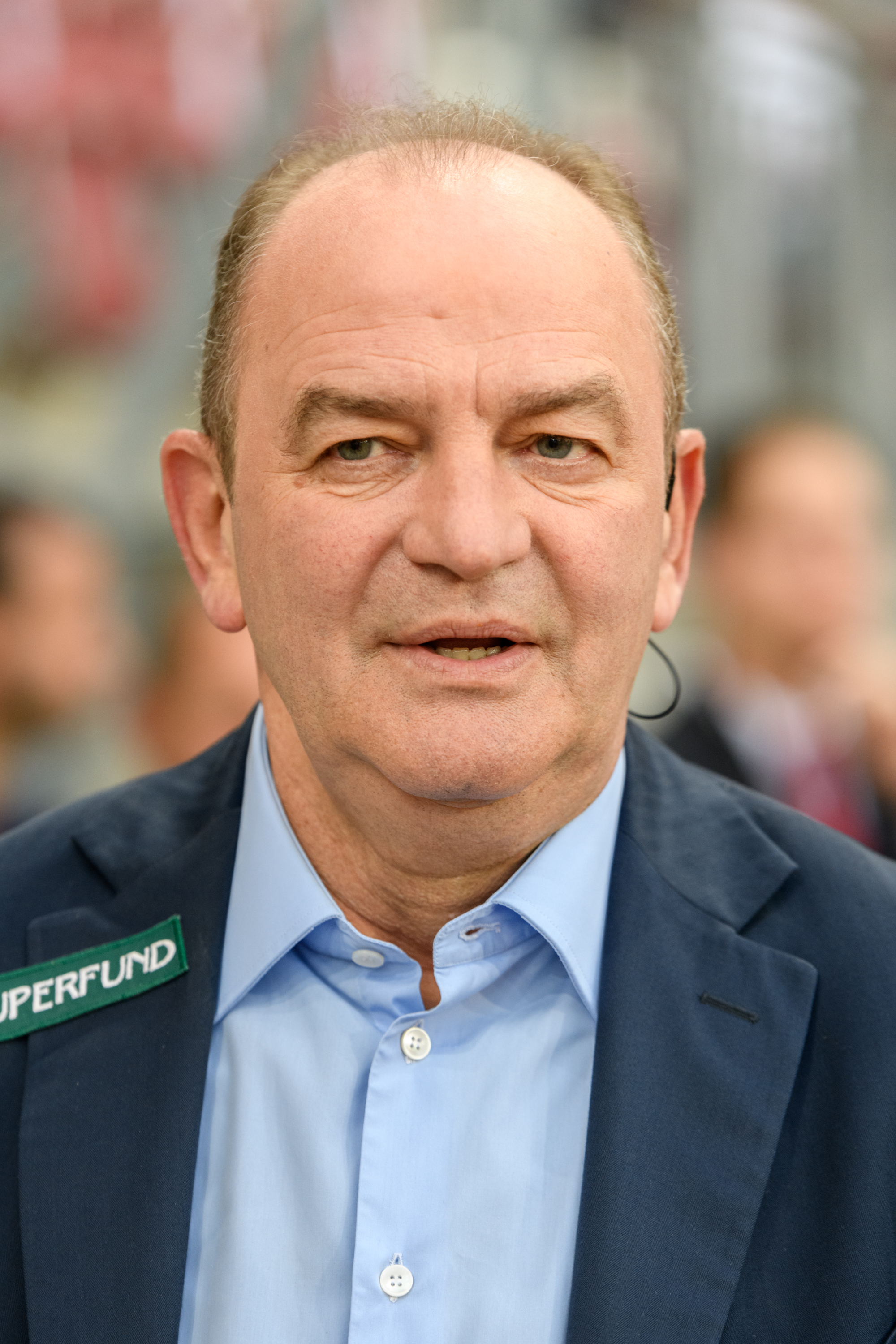
Herbert Prohaska, 2018

- Otto of Freising (c.1114–1158), Cistercian churchman and chronicler
- Johann Georg Albrechtsberger (1736–1809), an Austrian composer, organist and music theorist.
- Leopold Trattinnick (1764–1849), an Austrian botanist and mycologist.
- Nikolaus Lenau (1802–1850), poet, buried in the Weidling cemetery.
- Alphons Leopold Mielich (1863–1929), an Austrian painter of orientalist scenes.
- Walter Breisky (1871–1944), politician and Austrian chancellor, died in Klosterneuburg
- Hans Ledwinka (1878–1967), automobile designer
- Franz Kafka (1883–1924), author, died at the Hoffmann sanatorium in Kierling
- Pius Parsch (1884–1954), priest, died at Klosterneuburg
- Wolfgang Hoffmann (1900-1969), architect and designer
- Ernst Plischke (1903–1992), Austrian-New Zealand architect
- Karl Rahm (1907–1947), SS officer, commandant of Theresienstadt concentration camp executed for war crimes
- Roman Karl Scholz (1912–1944), local Augustinian canon regular, resistance activist, arrested 1941, executed 1944.
- O. W. Fischer (1915–2004), film and theatre actor
- Hilde Gueden (1917-1988), Austrian soprano, died in Klosterneuburg
- Leo Navratil (1921—2006), psychiatrist, worked at the Maria Gugging Psychiatric Clinic
- Gustav Peichl (1928—2019), architect
- Siegfried Selberherr (born 1955), scientist in the field of microelectronics.
- Karlheinz Essl, Jr. (born 1960), composer, performer and composition teacher
- Johanna Mikl-Leitner (born 1964), an Austrian politician (ÖVP) and the governor of Lower Austria since 2017.
- Thomas Aigner (born 1964), TV entertainer, documentary film producer and lecturer
- Martin Nowak (born 1965), biologist and mathematician

=== Sport ===
- Helmut Senekowitsch (1933–2007), footballer, played 354 games and 18 for Austria died locally
- Gerhard Seibold (born 1943), an Austrian sprint canoeist and bronze medallist at the 1968 Summer Olympics
- Herbert Prohaska (born 1955), footballer, played 535 games and 83 for Austria living in Kierling
- Michael Konsel (born 1962), football goalkeeper, played 450 games and 43 for Austria

== Coinage ==
Klosterneuburg commemorative coin

Klosterneuburg was recently selected as a main motif for a high value collectors' coin: the Klosterneuburg commemorative coin. The obverse shows a view of the abbey from the slopes of the Leopoldsberg in the Alps. The Romanesque-Gothic basilica as well as the copper dome with the imperial crown can be seen.

== Game culture ==
Klosterneuburg is also the prototype of the Kolosten Town scene map in Chapters 27–28 of the Chinese mobile game Honkai Impact 3rd. Klosterneuburg Abbey serves as the prototype of the 537 Church in the game, and the town’s renowned historical bishop Otto of Freising is the prototype of Otto Apocalypse.
