= Projekttheater Vorarlberg =

Austrian theatrical group

Projekttheater Vorarlberg is a theatrical group in Austria, established in 1988 by Sieglinde Müller and Dietmar Nigsch. It puts on two productions a year and has performed all over the Austria, South Tyrol and Bavaria since 1995. The group is directed by Susanne Lietzow. In 2006 the group received the Nestroy Theatre Prize for their production of Hans Carl Artmann's How much, Schatzi?.

== History ==
Projekttheater Vorarlberg was established in 1988 by Sieglinde Müller and Dietmar Nigsch.

In 1998, Projekttheater Vorarlberg received the Theatrical prize of the Internationale Bodenseekonferenz for their production of Werner Schwab's Die Präsidentinnen (The Madame Presidents). From February 2005 the group put on a production of Thomas Brasch's war play Frauen. Krieg. Lustspiel, featuring Maria Hofstätter and Martina Spitzer at the Wiener Konzerthaus. In 2006 the group were given the Nestroy Theatre Prize for their production of Hans Carl Artmann's How much, Schatzi?.

In March 2009, Projekttheater Vorarlberg put on an adapted production of the Friedrich Dürrenmatt comedy Once a Greek, featuring Maria Hofstätter, Sandra Bra and Peter Badstübner. Armin Arnold referred to it as "funny and heartily grotesque". From September 2011 the theatrical group put on a production of Tennessee Williams's Vieux Carré at Schauspielhaus Vienna.

From December 2013 to spring 2014 the group under director Susanne Lietzow put on a production of Philipp Weiss's Ein schöner Hase ist meistens der Einzellne, a play about two schizophrenic artists, based on the real-life story of poet Ernst Herbeck (1920 - 1991) and artist August Walla (1936 - 2001), long-term patients of the Gugging Mental Hospital near Vienna who became artists. Initially staged at the Alte Hallenbad Feldkirch, Vol.at noted the suitability and atmosphere of the theatre for the play, and stated that director Susanne Lietzow "knows how to create characters that make their world easier to understand". The play featured numerous disturbing conversations between the artists and elements of horror in its coverage of childhood trauma and electroshock therapies.
