= Johann Hauser =

Johann Hauser (1926 – 1996) was an Austrian outsider artist.

Born an orphan in today's Slovak Republic, he was placed in a home for mentally handicapped children. In 1942 he was committed for the first time. In 1949 he was transferred to Gugging, where he worked with Dr. Leo Navratil. With the doctor's encouragement he created many drawings and prints and become one of the most well known artists of the 'House of Artists'.

== Work ==
Hauser's drawings are raw and erotic, focused on the female form in which he saw unattainable desire and great power. Erotica was an indomitable force for him, very visible in his anxious figures, excessive physiognomy, and gestural lines of force.
