= České Velenice railway station =

Train station in the Czech Republic

České Velenice
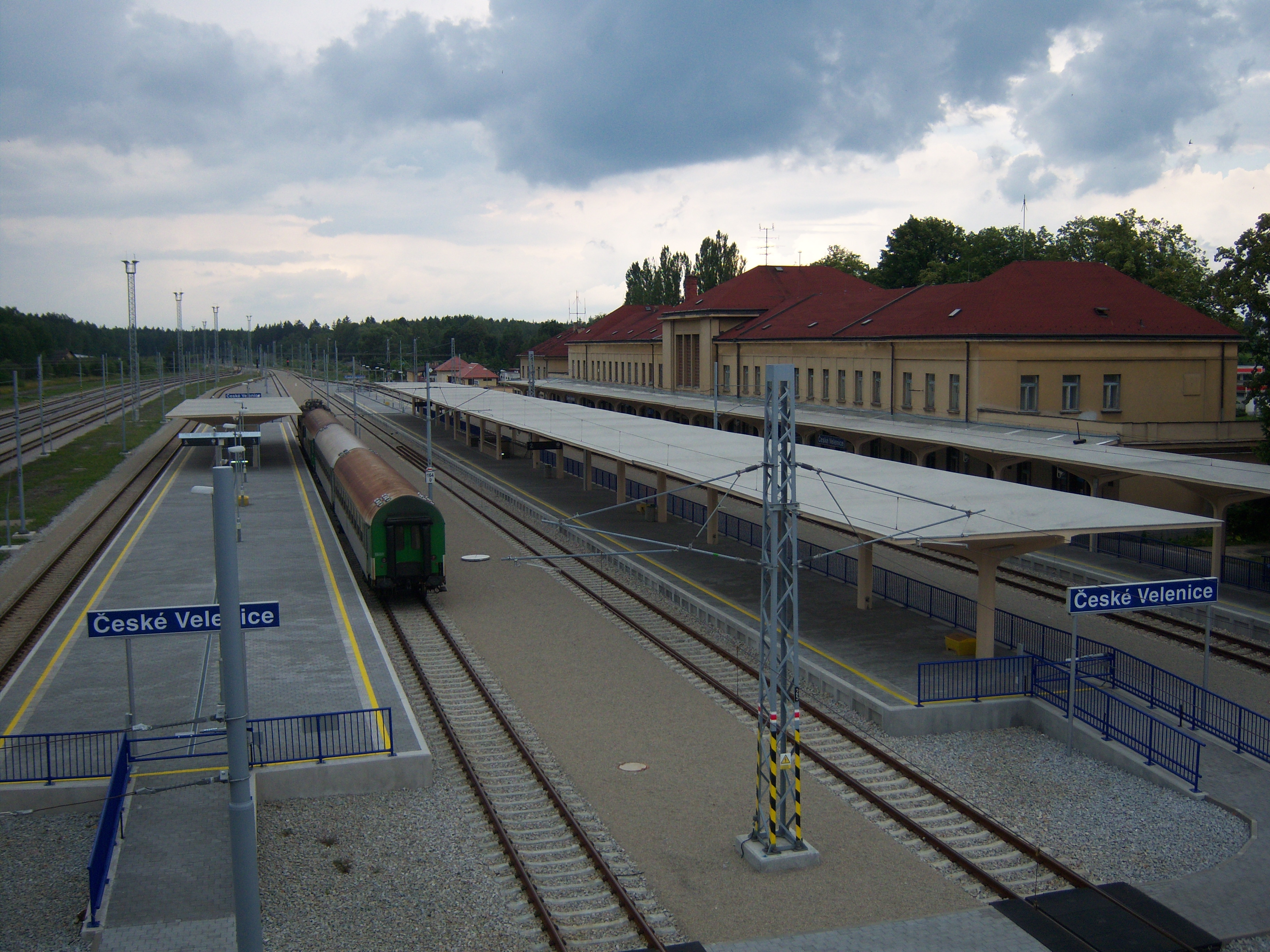
- View from the south

General information
- Location: Revoluční 209, 378 10 České Velenice; Czech Republic
- Coordinates: 48°46′09″N 14°57′28″E
- Owner: Czech Republic
- Platforms: 3

History
- Opened: 1 November 1869; 156 years ago
- Rebuilt: 1946, 2010
- Electrified: 11 June 2010
- Former names: Gmünd III Bahnhof (1938–1945) Gmünd (1869–1918)
- Pre-nationalisation: Emperor Franz Joseph Railway
Location
- Location within Czech Republic Location within Europe

České Velenice is a border train station in the western part of České Velenice in South Bohemian Region of the Czech Republic. It lies on the electrified track České Budějovice–Gmünd (199) (25 kV, 50 Hz AC/15 kV 16,7 Hz) and also not-electrified track České Velenice–Veselí nad Lužnicí (226).

The station is an important regional interchange between České dráhy's regional trains (Os & R) going to České Budějovice and Veselí nad Lužnicí (with R trains further to Prague) and ÖBB's regional express trains (REX) to Vienna. When the station was created, the territory belonged to the Austrian town of Gmünd. The contact with the Austrian railway system is at the bridge over the Lužnice River, which forms the state border and the ownership between Správa železnic and ÖBB-Infrastruktur AG.

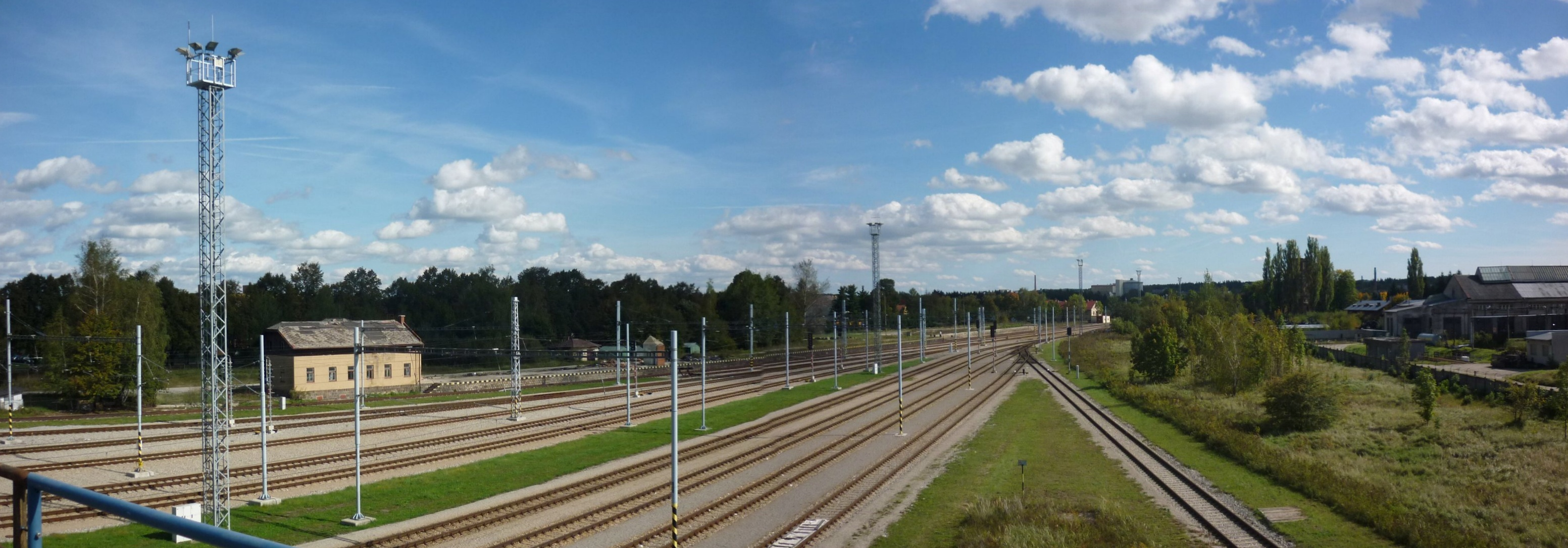
Tracks going southbound from the station across the border to the neighbouring town of Gmünd

== History ==
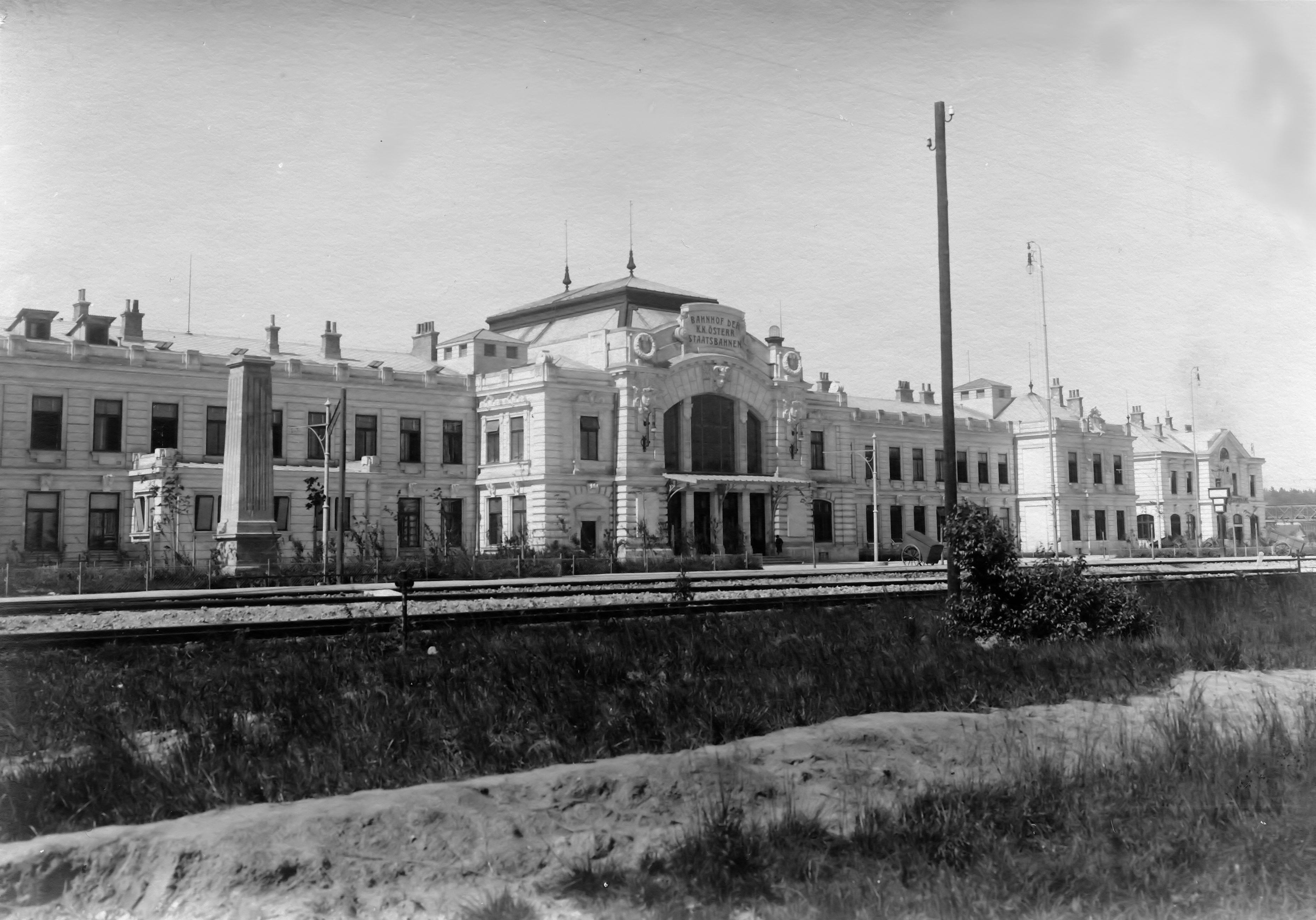
Station Gmünd KFJB with the original stucco decoration.

The railway station was built in the town of Gmünd by the private company Kaiser-Franz-Josephs-Bahn (KFJB) on the line connecting Vienna, České Budějovice, Plzeň and Cheb and was opened on 1 November 1869. Two years later, the KFJB completed the line from Vienna to Prague with a temporary terminus at Čerčany; the first train passed through the station when the section from České Velenice was opened on 3 September 1871. The rest of the line to Prague was opened on 14 December of the same year after the completion of the railway bridge over the Sázava River. The bridge was initially built temporarily of wood. After the nationalisation of the KFJB in 1884, the station was operated by one company, the Imperial Royal Austrian State Railways, and after 1918 the administration was taken over by the Czechoslovak State Railways. After the establishment of an independent Czechoslovakia, the border line along the Lužnice River was decided, which gave the station to Czechoslovakia.

In 1868, the construction of railway repair facilities began, which started operating a year later. In 1874, the workshops and the station in České Velenice (Gmünd) were expanded for the first time. After 33 years, in 1907, a trolleybus service was established from the station to the centre of Gmünd. This was only until 1916, when the service was discontinued due to lack of funding. the railway station and railway workshops were given to the Czechoslovakia around which the town of České Velenice was formed on 31 July 1920 by joining Dolní Velenice, Česká Cejle and Josefsko. According to the Munich Agreement, České Velenice fell to Nazi Germany and on 20 November 1938 it was renamed to Gmünd III – Bahnhof.

As the end of World War II approached and German troops retreated, the Allies supported their victorious campaign with massive bombing. One of the worst air raids took place in České Velenice: on 23 March 1945. The attack on the railway junction, where the lines to Vienna, Linz, Prague and Plzeň crossed, and which allowed the transport of wounded German soldiers and civilians from southern Europe to the Great German Reich, as well as the transport of missing ammunition and German recruits to the collapsing battlefield, resulted in hundreds of casualties, including civilians.

The first planes with bombs, which took off from bases in southern Italy, appeared over the city before noon. The attack was carried out by a group of 146 B-24 Liberator aircraft from the 55th Bomb Wing, 15th Air Force. USAAF, which attacked from an altitude of 8,000 to 10,000 feet from the direction of Austria over the České Velenice cemetery. In less than twenty minutes, the Americans dropped some 4,800 bombs weighing a total of 275 tons.

They hit not only the railway junction with the marshalling yard and the local repair shops, but also 120 civilian houses. Exactly how many people were killed cannot be determined with certainty. Estimates vary. Among the domestic population there were many workers, prisoners, refugees, people from train transports and soldiers. According to archival documents, 150 locals were killed, but it is believed that there were more than 1,100, possibly as many as 1,300 others.

The station was later rebuilt after the arrival of the Red Army to the occupied Czechoslovak territory.

== Recent reconstruction ==
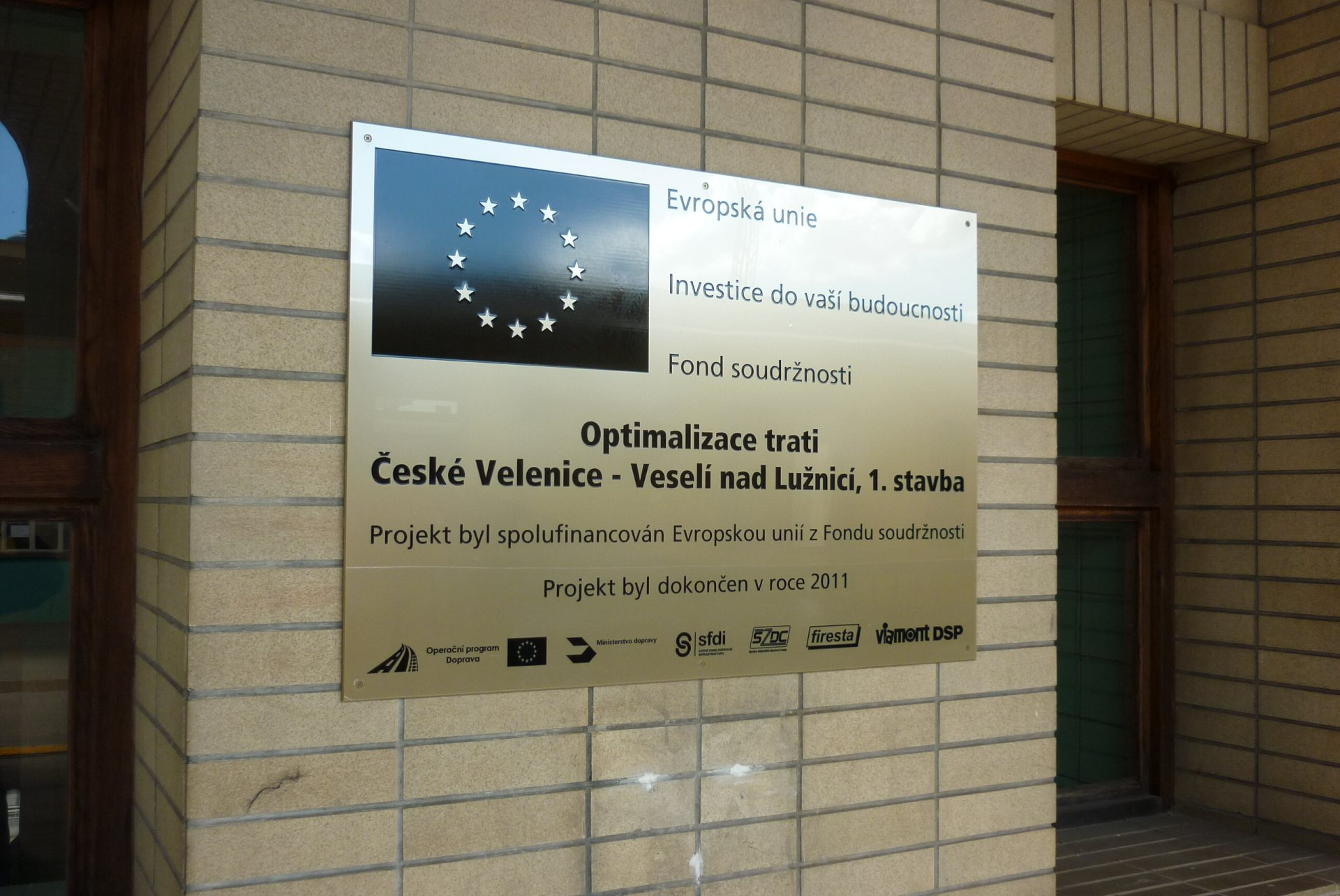
Conformation of reconstruction with the co-funding from the EU specifically for the track going to Veselí nad Lužnicí

On 26 May 2009, it was reported that the station will go under reconstruction partially funded by the European Union. Former CEO of Správa železnic (formerly known as Správa železniční dopravní cesty) Jan Komárek said that "the completed construction will result in bringing the České Velenice railway station to a technical condition corresponding to European criteria and standards."

In 2011, the reconstruction and modernisation of the station was completed; two covered island platforms were refurbished, including the subway. The platforms were equipped with an electronic passenger information system. The reconstruction of the building is the subject of another major contract. The station is electrified with a 25 kV/50 Hz system.

== Services ==
Preceding station	České dráhy	Following station
terminus	Stopping trains	Nová Ves nad Lužnicí toward Veselí nad Lužnicí
Nová Ves nad Lužnicí	Stopping trains	terminus or Gmünd NÖ terminus or toward Gmünd NÖ
terminus	Stopping trains	Vyšné toward České Budějovice, Dívčice, or Strakonice
Vyšné	Stopping trains	terminus
terminus	Regional fast trains	Vyšné toward České Budějovice
Gmünd NÖ or terminus	Fast trains	Suchdol nad Lužnicí zastávka toward Praha hl.n.
Suchdol nad Lužnicí zastávka	Fast trains	terminus or Gmünd NÖ terminus or toward Göpfritz an der Wild
