= Herbeck =

Herbeck is a surname. Notable people with the surname include:

- Bobby Herbeck (born 1945), American actor, film producer, and screenwriter
- Dan Herbeck (born 1954), American journalist and writer
- Ernst Herbeck (1920–1991), German poet
- Johann von Herbeck (1831–1877), Austrian musician
