= Oswald Tschirtner =

Austrian artist (1920–2007)

- Died: 20 May 2007
- Occupations: Printmaker, drawer, visual artist

Oswald Tschirtner (1920 in Perchtoldsdorf, Lower Austria – 20 May 2007) was an artist from Austria who had schizophrenia. He was known by the "pseudonym" of O.T.

== Life ==
Oswald Tschirtner was raised by an aunt and uncle in Vienna, and being very religious, attended a seminary school from the age of ten. He intended to become a priest, but was drafted into the German army in 1937. He fought at Stalingrad, and subsequently spent time in a prison camp in southern France. After the war, he was stricken by periods of religious fervor and violent episodes, and was sent to a psychiatric institute in 1947.

In 1957, he was sent to the Klosterneuburg Hospital near Vienna, and it was there that he began to draw, albeit reluctantly, under the supervision of Leo Navratil and other hospital staff. He displayed a unique approach to his works through his selective use of line and detail. His figures, particularly in his drawings from the 1980s onwards, are extremely reductive, and he arrives at the essential essence of portrayal through the conveyance of a minimal amount of visual detail.

Tschirtner lived at the Haus der Künstler (House of Artists) since its opening in 1981. Located on the grounds of the Klosterneuburg Hospital in Maria-Gugging, Austria, this is a domicile where patients who show significant artistic talent live very independently and focus on their creative work.

== Solo exhibitions ==
- 1980 Museum Moderner Kunst Wien

== Books ==
- illustration in "Bebende Herzen im Leibe der Hunde", München 1979

== See also ==
- Zeichnungen des Patienten O. T.
