= Ein schöner Hase ist meistens der Einzellne =

- Written by: Philipp Weiss (directed by Susanne Lietzow)
- Original language: German

Premiere
- Date premiered: 13 December 2013
- Place premiered: Feldkirch, Austria

Ein schöner Hase ist meistens der Einzellne (A Beautiful Rabbit is Mostly the Individual) is a 2013 play by Austrian playwright and writer Philipp Weiss. It is based on the true story of two schizophrenic patients of the Gugging mental institution which uses artistic therapy. The play premiered at Feldkirch's Alte Hallenbad Feldkirch on 13 December 2013 in a production by the Projekttheater Vorarlberg theatrical group.

== Plot ==
The avant-garde poet Ernst Herbeck (1920–1991) and artist August Walla (1936–2001) live much of their lives as schizophrenic patients in the Gugging mental institution near Vienna. Though they have the same condition they are fundamentally different people. Walla is still haunted by the death of his grandmother as a child and perceives the universe to have collapsed, while Herbeck is concerned with his cleft lip and palate condition, which severely affects his ability to speak. The play is divided into five different acts, in chronological order, following the protagonists as they interpret and reinterpret each other, often in a disturbing way.

== Background ==
Weiss studied the works of Herbeck and Walla in preparation for penning the play and drew upon a wealth of documentary material, from medical records, court records, psychiatric journals and books to film footage and interviews and research at the State Hospital for Psychiatry and Neurology and Gugging itself.

== Reception ==
The play premiered Alte Hallenbad Feldkirch in Feldkirch on December 13, 2013, in a production by director Susanne Lietzow and the Projekttheater Vorarlberg theatrical group. It was then performed at the Schauspielhaus's in Vienna and Graz. The play was lauded by critics, with Wiener Zeitung writing "Gripping, touching, with wit and brooding aftermath: rare theater luck" and European Cultural News writing: "Big, really big theater. A great moment at contemporary Austrian theatre". Die Presse wrote: "Great job. A cacophony of horror".

Vol.at noted the suitability and atmosphere of the old swimming pool building for the play, and stated that director Susanne Lietzow "knows how to create characters that make their world easier to understand". They note the many disturbing conversations between the artists, stating that "the things they say and do are disturbing, irritating, also provocative, sometimes crazy and incomprehensible". They also note the elements of horror in its coverage of childhood trauma and electroshock therapies.
