= Johann Adolf II of Schwarzenberg =

Austrian industrialist (1799–1888)

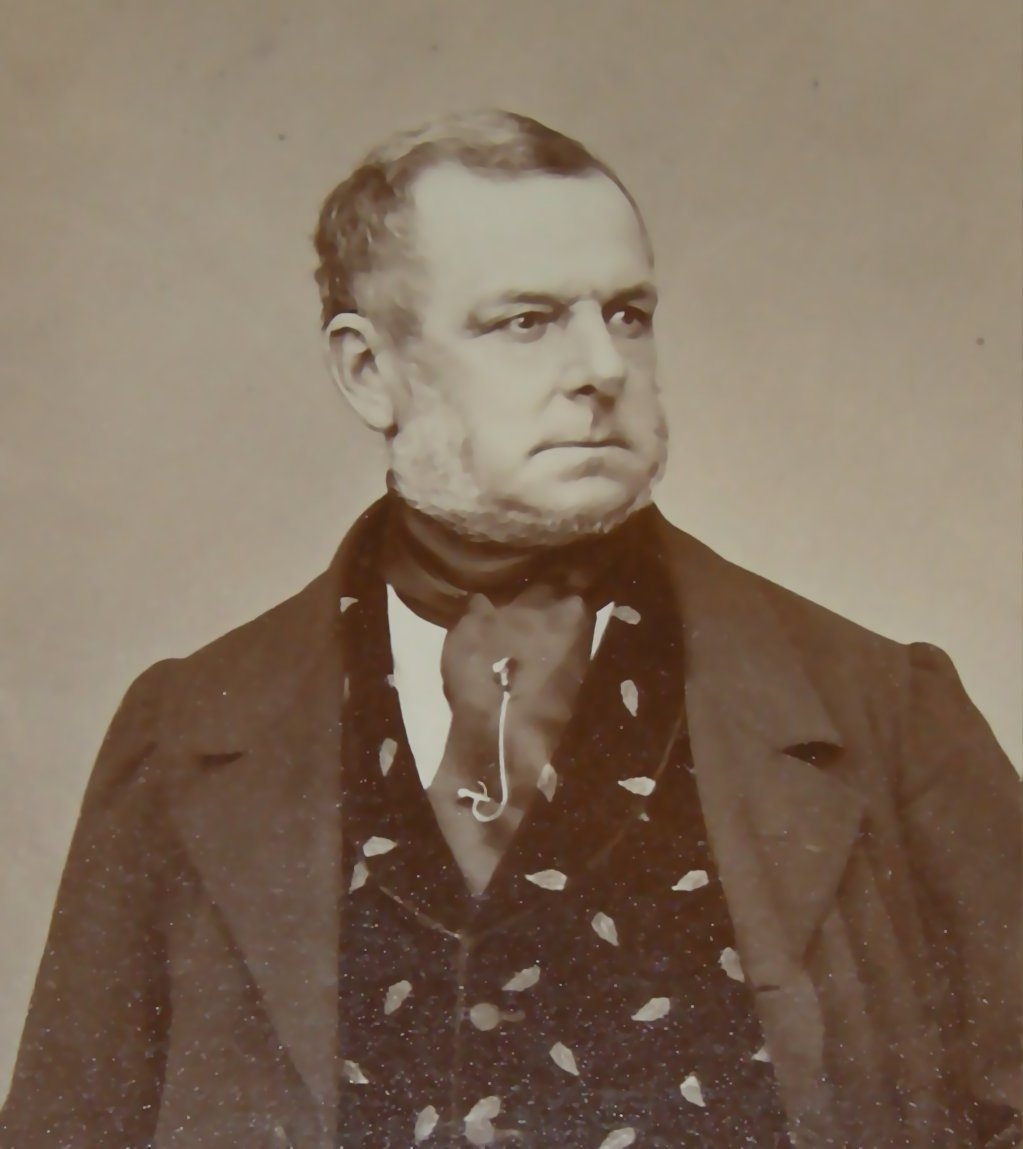
Johann Adolf II of Schwarzenberg in c. 1880

Johann Adolf II, Prince of Schwarzenberg (22 May 1799 – 15 September 1888) was an Austrian industrialist, diplomat and member of the noble Schwarzenberg family.

== Biography ==
Schwarzenberg was born on 22 May 1799 in Vienna. He was born the eldest son of Joseph II, Prince of Schwarzenberg (1769–1833) and his wife Pauline von Arenberg (1774–1810). In 1810, he lost his mother, who died in the fire in the Austrian Embassy in Paris. He became 7th Prince of Schwarzenberg in 1833 and a Knight in the Order of the Golden Fleece in 1836.

Unlike his younger brother Prince Felix of Schwarzenberg (1800–1852), he did not aspire to a high position at the Imperial court. Another brother was the Viennese Cardinal Friedrich of Schwarzenberg (1809–1885), who later rose to become Archbishop of Salzburg.

Prince Johann Adolf was chairman of the Economic Society in Prague and Vienna. He is considered the initiator of the Emperor Franz Joseph Railway, with which he intended to transport coal from Plzeň to Vienna.

In 1825, he served as a special ambassador in Paris, in 1835 in Berlin, and in 1837 in London. In 1855, he participated in the founding of the Creditanstalt and served as its president until 1860. He was considered Europe's leading agricultural expert, was a member of many agricultural and forestry enterprises, and supported associations for trade and industry, as well as for the arts and sciences. He demonstrated his Anglophilia by remodeling the Bohemian Hluboká Castle in the Tudor Gothic style.

He died in Frauenberg on 15 September 1888.

=== Marriage and children ===
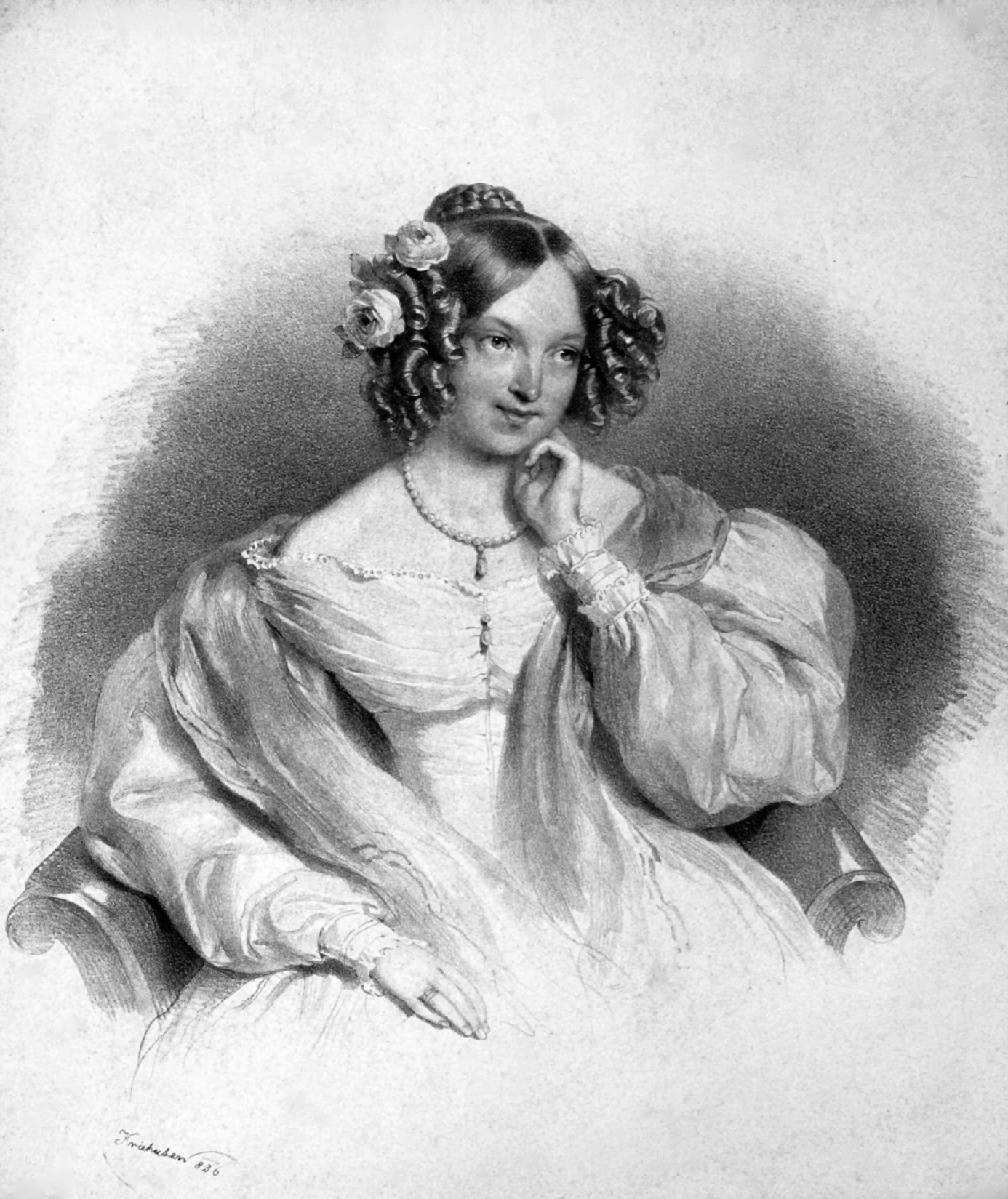
Princess Eleonore Schwarzenberg (1812–1873), lithography 1836

In 1830, he married Princess Eleonore (Lore) of Liechtenstein (1812–1873), a daughter of Lieutenant Field Marshal Prince Moritz of Liechtenstein (1775–1819) and Princess Marie Leopoldine Esterházy (1788–1846).

Princess Lore Schwarzenberg was the leading Grande Dame, the leading Salonnière in Vienna, for three decades until her death.
Nora Fugger wrote of her:

She was rich, beautiful, witty, possessed of rare delicacy and always willing to be charitable. Yet she also knew how to wield a strict scepter with a delicate hand. She dictated tone and fashion. Who would be admitted to court society depended on her. An invitation to her house opened the door to all the noble houses of Vienna. And no one dared to disobey her unspoken orders. Princess Lore Schwarzenberg, who remained beautiful well into her old age... was one of the most distinguished among the many noble, great ladies of Vienna.

The couple had 2 children:

- Adolf Josef (1832–1914), married in 1857 Ida Maria von Liechtenstein (1839–1921), archaeologist
- Marie Leopoldine (1833–1909), married Ernst Graf von Waldstein-Wartenberg (1821–1904)
