= Albertina Klosterneuburg =

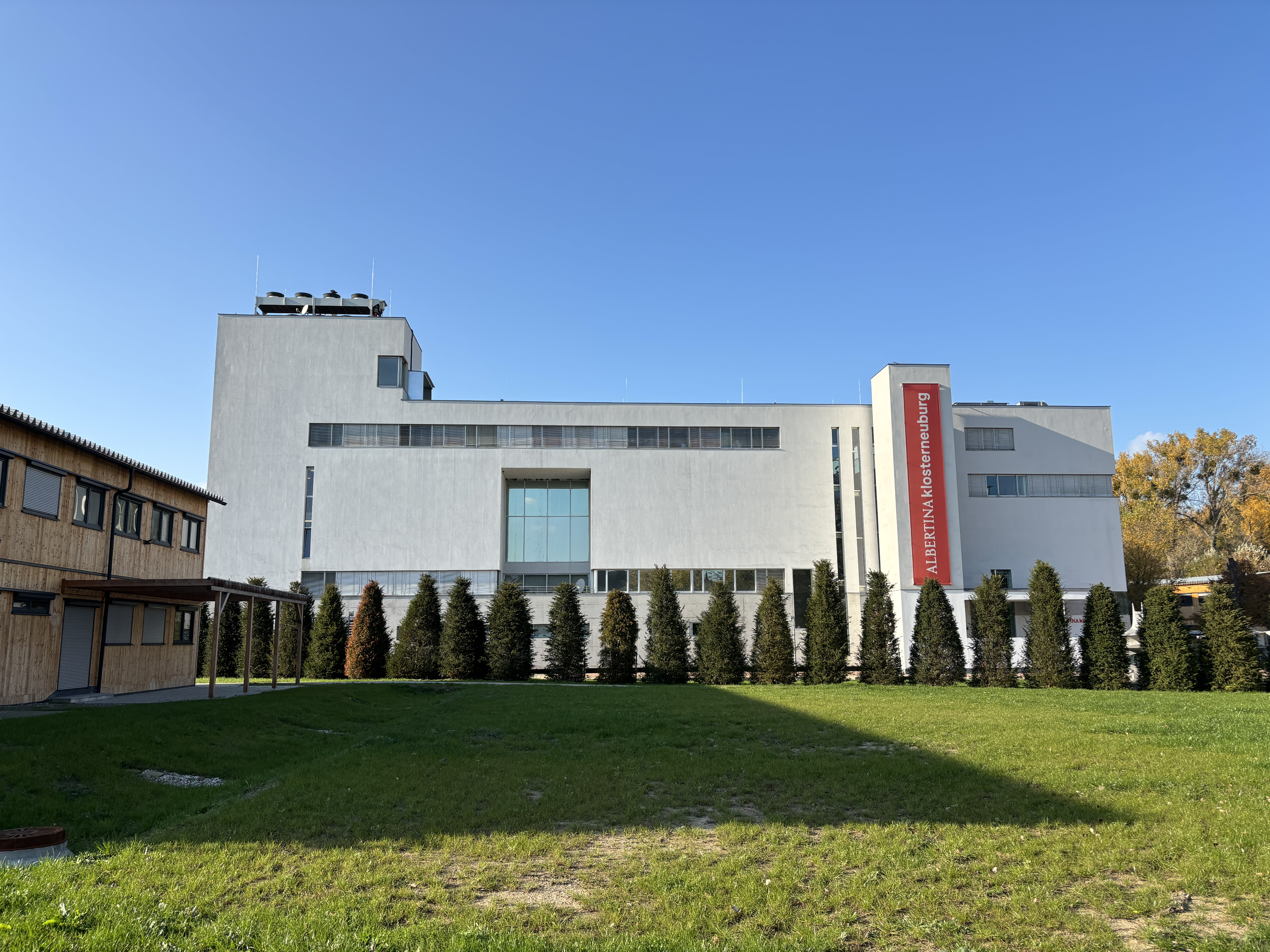
- The Albertina Klosterneuburg
- Established: 2024
- Location: An der Donau-Au 1, Klosterneuburg, Austria
- Coordinates: 48.301842°N 16.333806°E
- Type: Art gallery
- Founder: Klaus Albrecht Schröder
- Website: www.albertina.at/en/albertina-klosterneuburg/

The Albertina Klosterneuburg is a contemporary art gallery located in the town of Klosterneuburg, Austria. It is a branch of the Albertina gallery in Vienna and opened in April 2024.

== History ==
The Essl Museum operated in Klosterneuburg between 1999 and 2016. When it closed due to financial problems the collection was donated to the Albertina. The Albertina also gained control of the museum's building in 2017. The building was used to store the Essl collection and other contemporary artworks. The Albertina's workshop was also located there.

In April 2024 the Albertina Klosterneuburg opened to the public. It displays post-1945 works held by the Albertina and is the second branch of the gallery, after the Albertina Modern which opened in 2020.

As part of an interview conducted to mark his retirement in December 2024, Albertina director Klaus Albrecht Schröder identified not opening the Albertina Klosterneuburg at an earlier date as being a mistake. He noted that "I should have founded the Albertina Klosterneuburg five years earlier. The [COVID-19] pandemic got in the way a little and it was also a bad decision on my part".
