= Gmünd NÖ railway station =

Border train station in Gmünd, Lower Austria

Gmünd NÖ
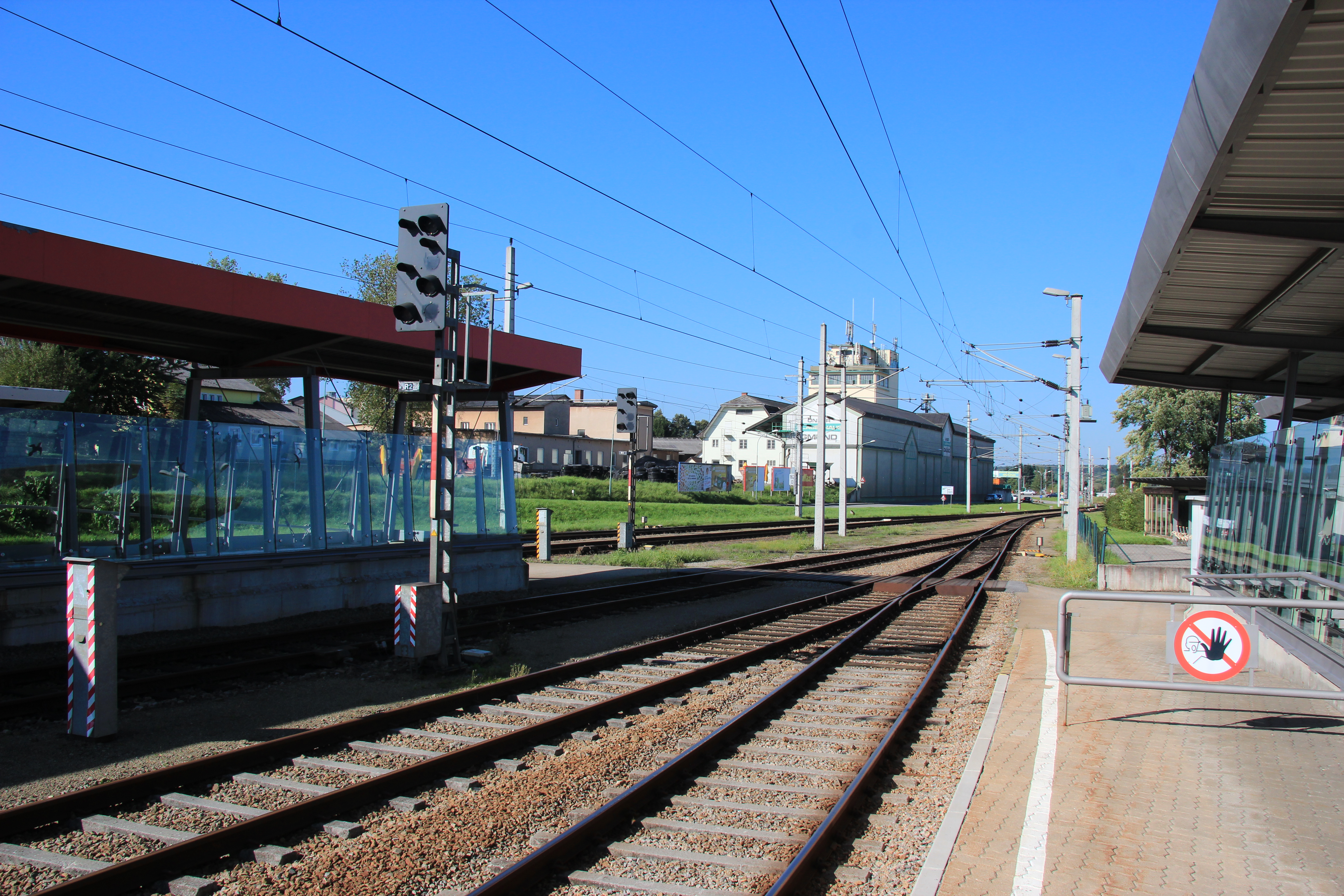
- Look from platform 1 of the standard-gauge railway in the direction of České Velenice

General information
- Location: Habsburg-Lothringen-Straße 5, 3950 Lower Austria; District Gmünd; Austria
- Coordinates: 48°45′51″N 14°59′04″E
- Owner: Austrian Federal Railways
- Platforms: ÖBB: 3; NOVÖG: 3
Location

Gmünd NÖ is a border train station in the town Gmünd, situated in the Lower Austria. The station is divided to two sections. One is a standard-gauge railway (formerly known as Franz-Josefs Railway) currently operated by Austrian Federal Railways from České Velenice to Wien Franz-Josefs station. The other one is narrow-gauge railway operated by Waldviertler railways between Groß Genungs, Litschau and Heidenreichstein.

== See also ==
- Rail transport in Austria
