= České Velenice =

- Town
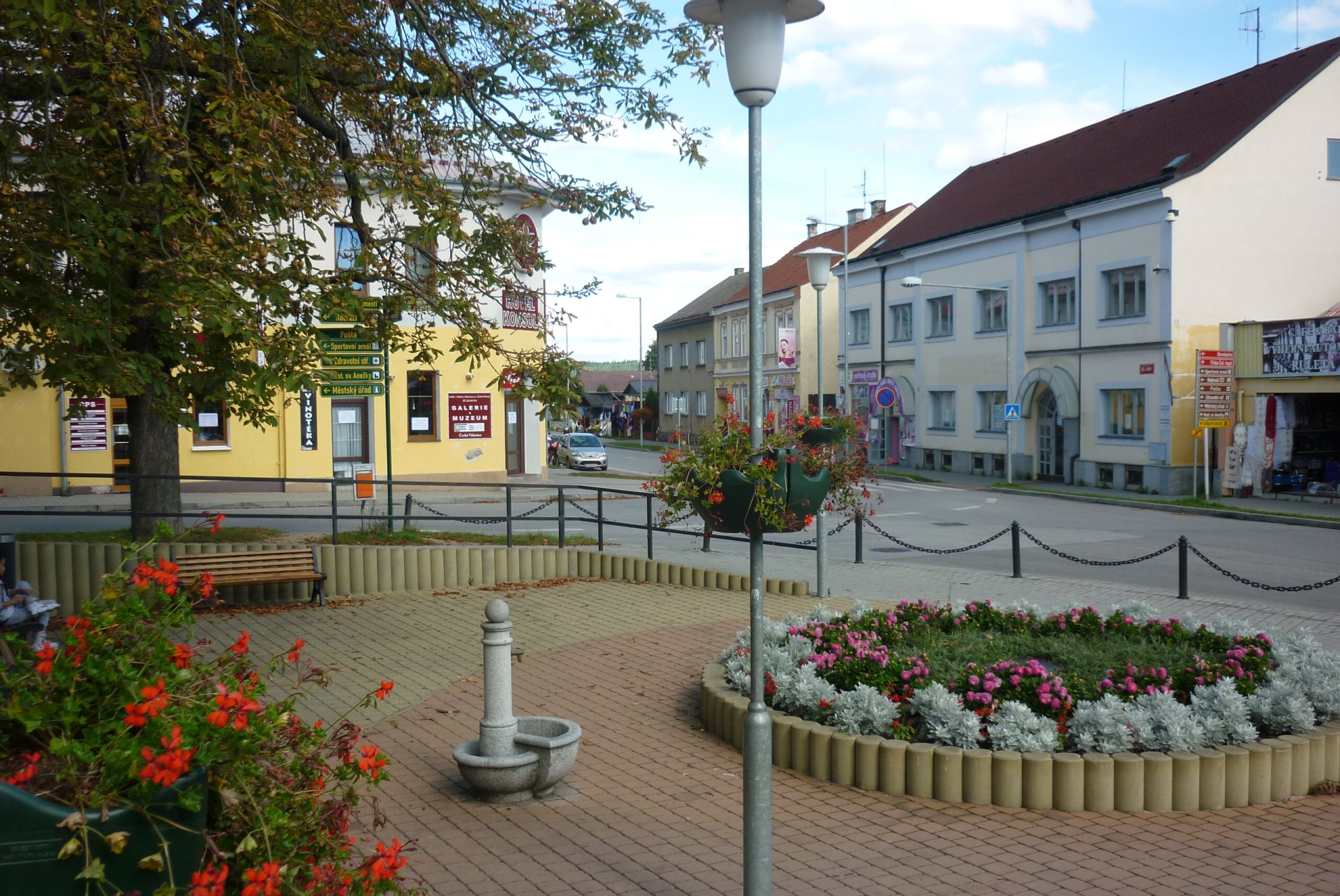
- Town centre

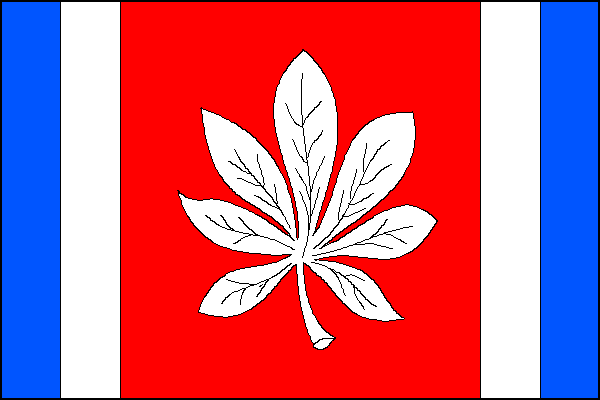
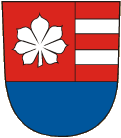
- Flag Coat of arms

- Location in the Czech Republic
- Coordinates: 48°46′7″N 14°57′49″E
- Country: Czech Republic
- Region: South Bohemian
- District: Jindřichův Hradec
- First mentioned: 1387

Government
  - Mayor: Jaroslav Slíva

Area
  - Total: 12.09 km^{2} (4.67 sq mi)
- Elevation: 489 m (1,604 ft)

Population (2026-01-01)
  - Total: 3,687
  - Density: 305.0/km^{2} (789.8/sq mi)
- Time zone: UTC+1 (CET)
  - Summer (DST): UTC+2 (CEST)
- Postal code: 378 10
- Website: www.velenice.cz

České Velenice (Czech pronunciation: [ˈtʃɛskɛː ˈvɛlɛɲɪtsɛ], German: Unterwielands, Gmünd-Wielands, Gmünd-Bahnhof) is a town in Jindřichův Hradec District in the South Bohemian Region of the Czech Republic. It has about 3,700 inhabitants. The town is located in the Třeboň Basin on the border with Austria and is adjacent to the town of Gmünd, to which it once belonged.

== Geography ==
Suchdol nad Lužnicí is located about 41 kilometres (25 mi) south of Jindřichův Hradec and 41 km (25 mi) southeast of České Budějovice, on the border with Austria. It lies in the Třeboň Basin. The highest point is the flat hill Andělský kopec at 525 m (1,722 ft) above sea level.

== History ==
Until 1870, there were only small settlements of Česká Cejle, Josefsko and Dolní Velenice in the area constituting current České Velenice, and it was part of the Austrian town of Gmünd. In 1868, the main railway station and the factory for repairing rolling stock and locomotives were established. The development of this border area was decisively increased by the inauguration of the Emperor Franz Joseph Railway connecting Vienna to Prague in 1869. Due to the construction, housing estates were built and the population grew, especially of Czech nationality.

At the end of World War I, the Treaty of Saint-Germain-en-Laye (1919) awarded the territory to Czechoslovakia. On 31 July it was officially attached to Czechoslovakia and became the new municipality, at first under the names Cmunt v Čechách and Český Cmunt, and since 1922 under the name České Velenice. Until 1938, České Velenice was a prospering municipality with an important railway junction.

During World War II, České Velenice changed to a town with 95% of population being of German nationality. On 23 March 1945, the town and the railway workshops were severely damaged by American-English air strikes. This caused a mass exodus from the town of people who lost both their homes and their employment. After the war, the depopulated town was partially inhabited by the original residents.

== Demographics ==
Historical population

Year	Pop.	±%
1869	1,026	—
1880	1,930	+88.1%
1890	2,514	+30.3%
1900	4,097	+63.0%
1910	5,713	+39.4%

Year	Pop.	±%
1921	4,750	−16.9%
1930	4,863	+2.4%
1950	2,705	−44.4%
1961	2,892	+6.9%
1970	3,008	+4.0%

Year	Pop.	±%
1980	3,177	+5.6%
1991	3,605	+13.5%
2001	3,523	−2.3%
2011	3,460	−1.8%
2021	3,327	−3.8%

Source: Censuses

== Economy ==
The largest employer based in the town is the company Magna Cartech, a branch of Magna International. It focuses on sheet metal pressing and welding for automotive industry.

== Transport ==
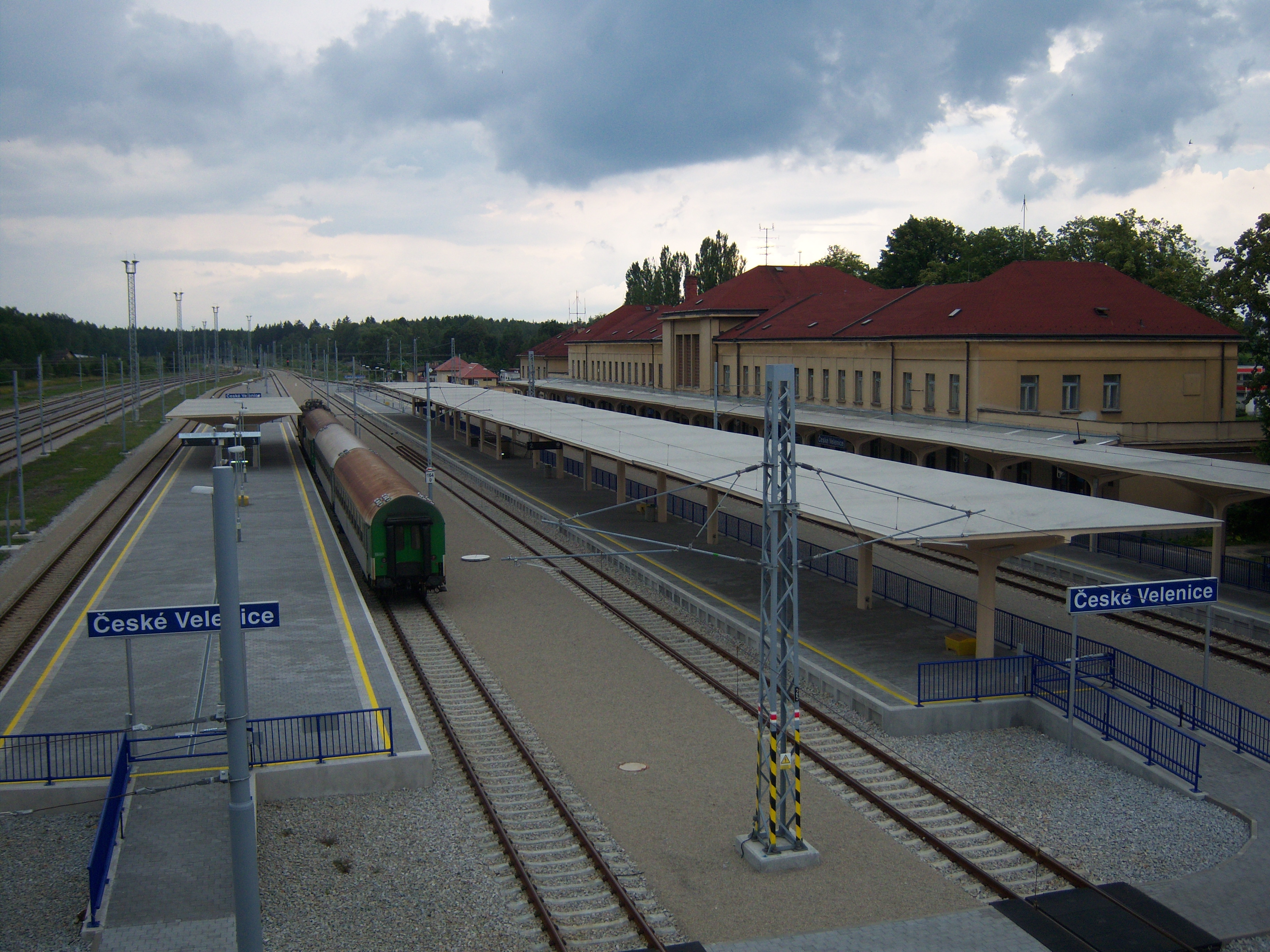
České Velenice railway station

České Velenice railway station is located of the international line Prague–Vienna and is the terminus of the line from České Budějovice. The town shares the railway and pedestrian border crossing with Gmünd in Austria.

== Education ==
České Velenice is home to one secondary school and one primary school. The secondary school mainly focuses on business, transport and mechanics.

== Sights ==
The only protected cultural monument in České Velenice is the Church of Saint Agnes of Bohemia. It was built in 1935. Around the church is an English-style park.

== Notable people ==
- Adolf Born (1930–2016), painter, cartoonist and illustrator
