= Philipp Weiss =

Austrian writer and playwright

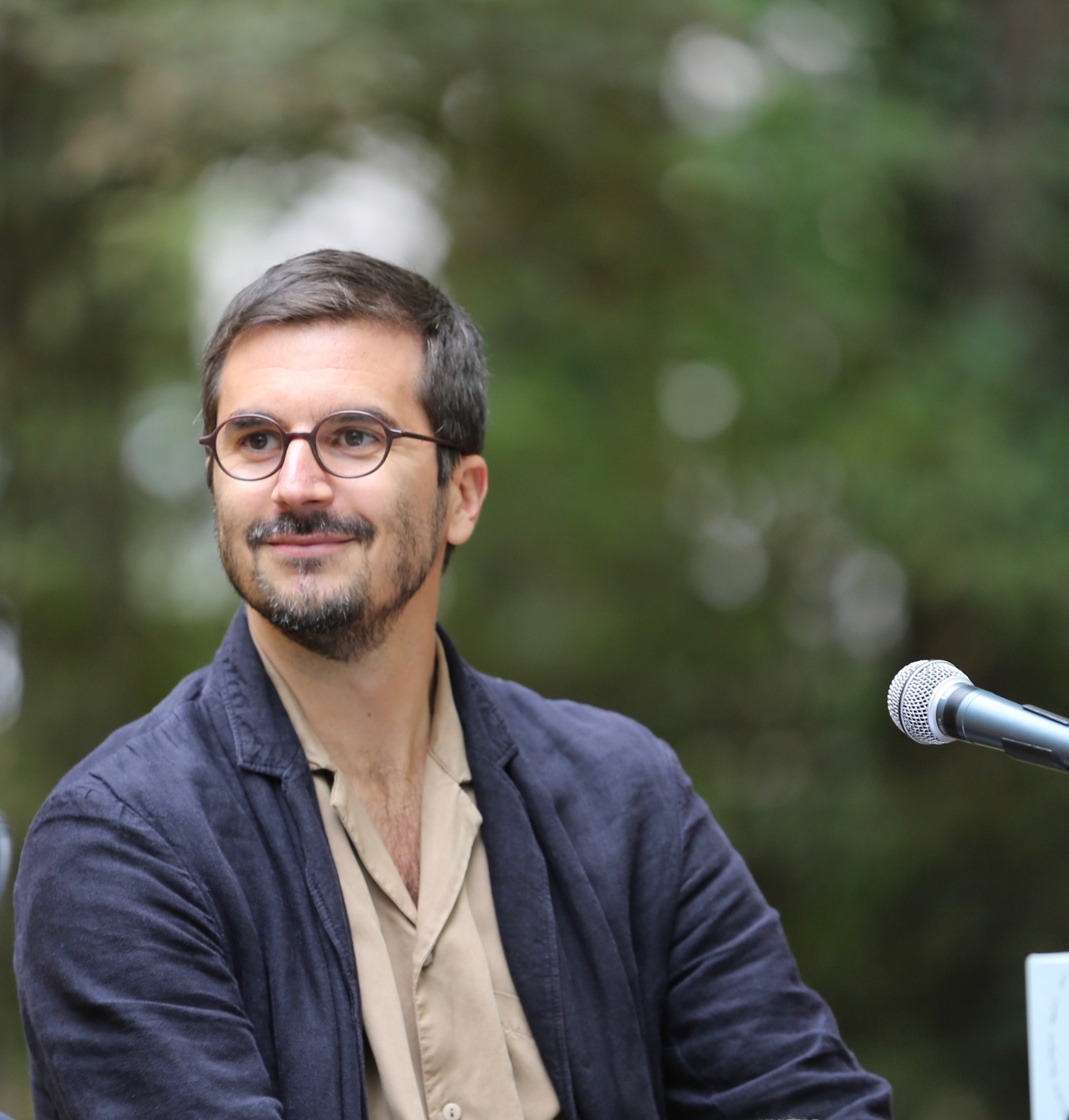
Weiss in 2018

Philipp Weiss (born 5 February 1982 in Vienna) is an Austrian writer and playwright. In September 2018, he published his critically acclaimed debut novel, Am Weltenrand sitzen die Menschen und lachen.

== Early life and background ==
Weiss was born in Vienna in 1982. He studied German philology, philosophy and German as a foreign language at the University of Vienna. As a master's thesis, he wrote a deconstructivist essay on Peter Handke's A Sorrow Beyond Dreams with Wolfgang Müller-Funk. After graduation, in 2008, he taught at the Baku State University in Azerbaijan. He currently lives and works in Vienna.

== Writing career ==
His theatrical text Egon was published by Passagen Verlag in 2008 and was presented in the form of a scenic reading and performance at the Leopold Museum in Vienna. Weiss took part in the Ingeborg Bachmann Prize in 2009 with his text Blätterliebe. In 2010, his play Seifenblasenoper. Eine Kritik der runden Vernunft was presented at the Burgtheater Vienna. In 2011 he won the Hans Gratzer grant with his play Allerwelt, with a world premiere at the Schauspielhaus in Vienna, where he was the in-house author in the 2013/14 season.

In January 2013 his story Tartaglia appeared in the Edition Atelier in Vienna. From December 2013 to spring 2014, Projekttheater Vorarlberg put on a production of Weiss's Ein schöner Hase ist meistens der Einzellne, a play based on the real-life story of poet Ernst Herbeck (1920–1991) and artist August Walla (1936–2001), long-term schizophrenic artistic patients of the Gugging Mental Hospital near Vienna.

In September 2018, Weiss published his critically acclaimed debut novel Am Weltenrand sitzen die Menschen at Suhrkamp Verlag (Berlin). The 1,056 pages were published as five volumes in a slipcase, but are a coherent novel. The novel won the 2018 Literaturpreis der Jürgen Ponto-Stiftung and Klaus-Michael Kühne-Preis and 2019 Rauris Literature Prize awards. In October 2019, his play Der letzte Mensch (The Last Man) premiered at Nestroyhof Hamakom, which deals with the future of mankind in various scenarios.

== Works ==
- Weiss, Philipp (1 January 2013). Tartaglia (in German). Wien: Ed. Atelier. ISBN 978-3-902498-73-1.
- —— (10 September 2018). Am Weltenrand sitzen die Menschen und lachen (in German). Berlin: Suhrkamp. ISBN 978-3-518-42817-7.
