= Ernst Herbeck =

Austrian poet (1920–1991)

Ernst Herbeck (9 October 1920, Stockerau, Lower Austria – 11 September 1991) was an Austrian poet. In 1940, at the age of 20, Herbeck was committed to the national mental hospital in Lower Austria (Niederösterreich). He lived in the institution for most of his life. After 15 years he began writing poetry and completed thousands of poems, until his death on 11 September 1991.

== Life ==
Herbeck grew up in Stockerau, Lower Austria. At the age of 20, whilst working as an unskilled worker in a munitions factory, he began displaying signs of schizophrenia. He was first committed in 1940, but at times his condition would improve briefly. In October 1944 he was even called into military service, only to be discharged in March 1945.

A year after the end of the war, Herbeck was committed indefinitely. After fifteen years in an institution, Herbeck began writing poetry. Often referred to as naive, his poetry is notable for its brevity and peculiar turns of phrase.

The titles of many of his poems are the names of animals that were offered to him by his psychiatrist Leo Navratil as exercises. Two years before his death, Herbeck gave more than 1,000 of his handwritten sheets to the Austrian national library as a donation.

== Legacy ==
W. G. Sebald wrote an article about Herbeck entitled Das Häschens Kind, der kleine Has: On the poet Ernst Herbeck's totem animal, the hare, collected in his book Campo Santo (2003). Sebald recounts a visit with an elderly Ernst Herbeck in his debut novel Vertigo (1990).

Herbeck was featured as a character in Philipp Weiss's 2013 play Ein schöner Hase ist meistens der Einzellne.
