= Emperor Franz Joseph Railway =

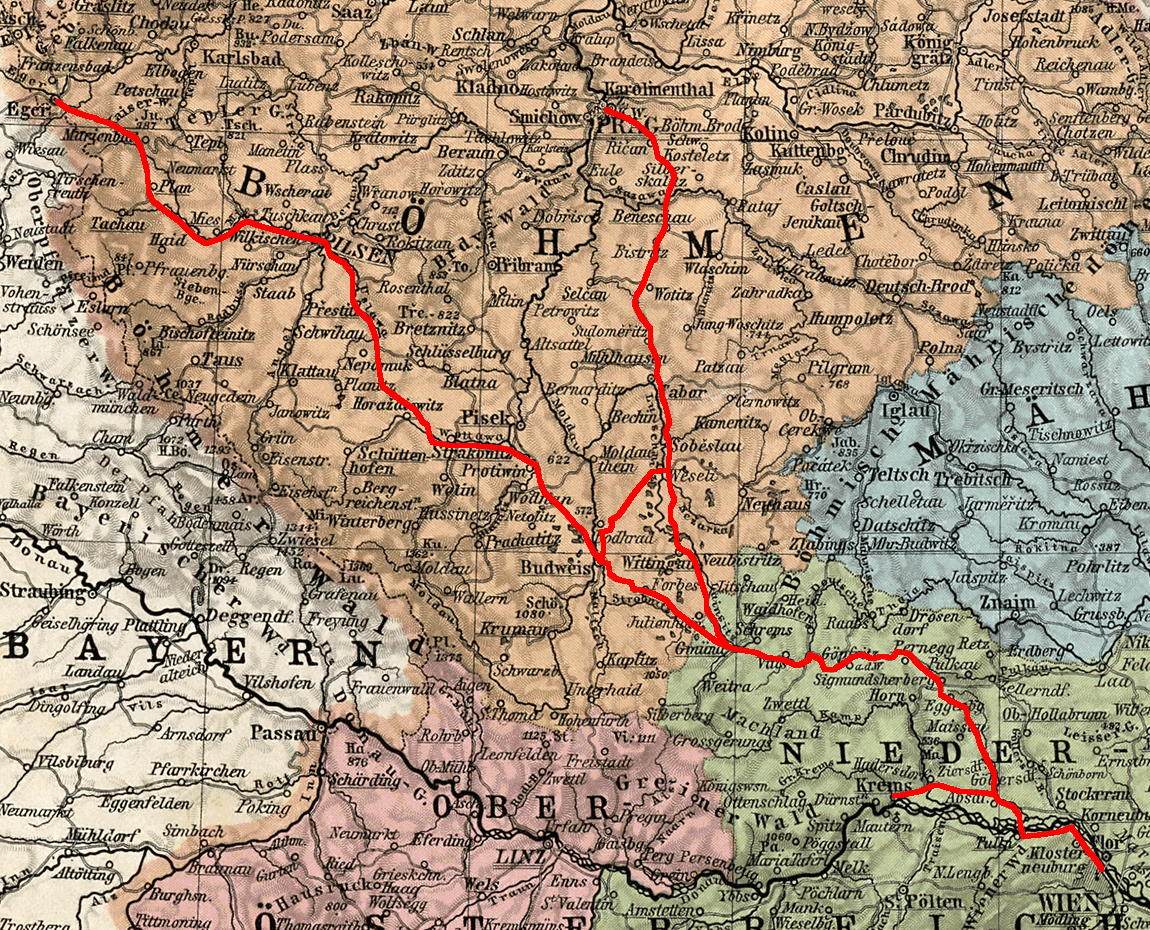
KFJB network

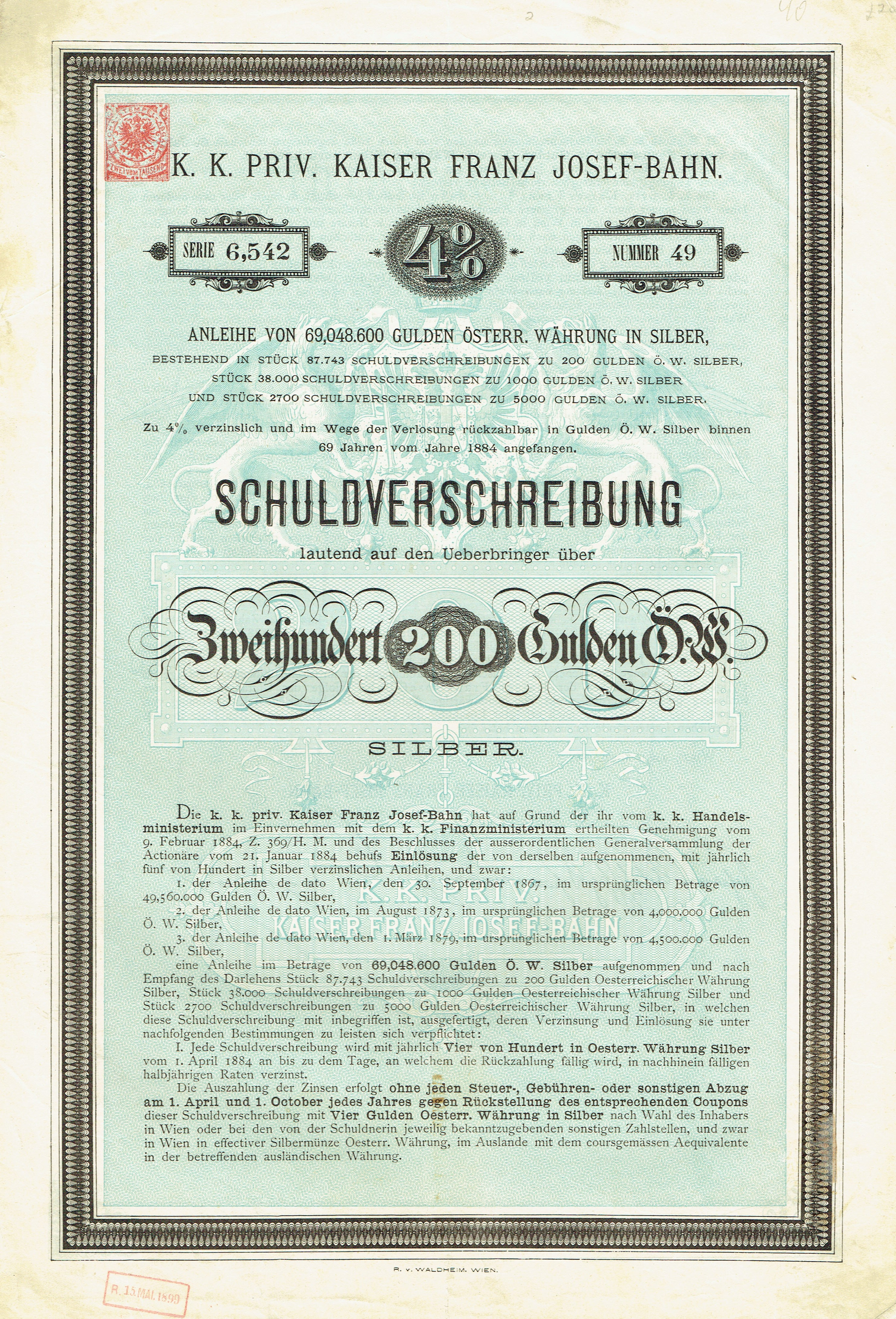
Bond of the Emperor Franz Joseph Railway, issued 1 April 1884

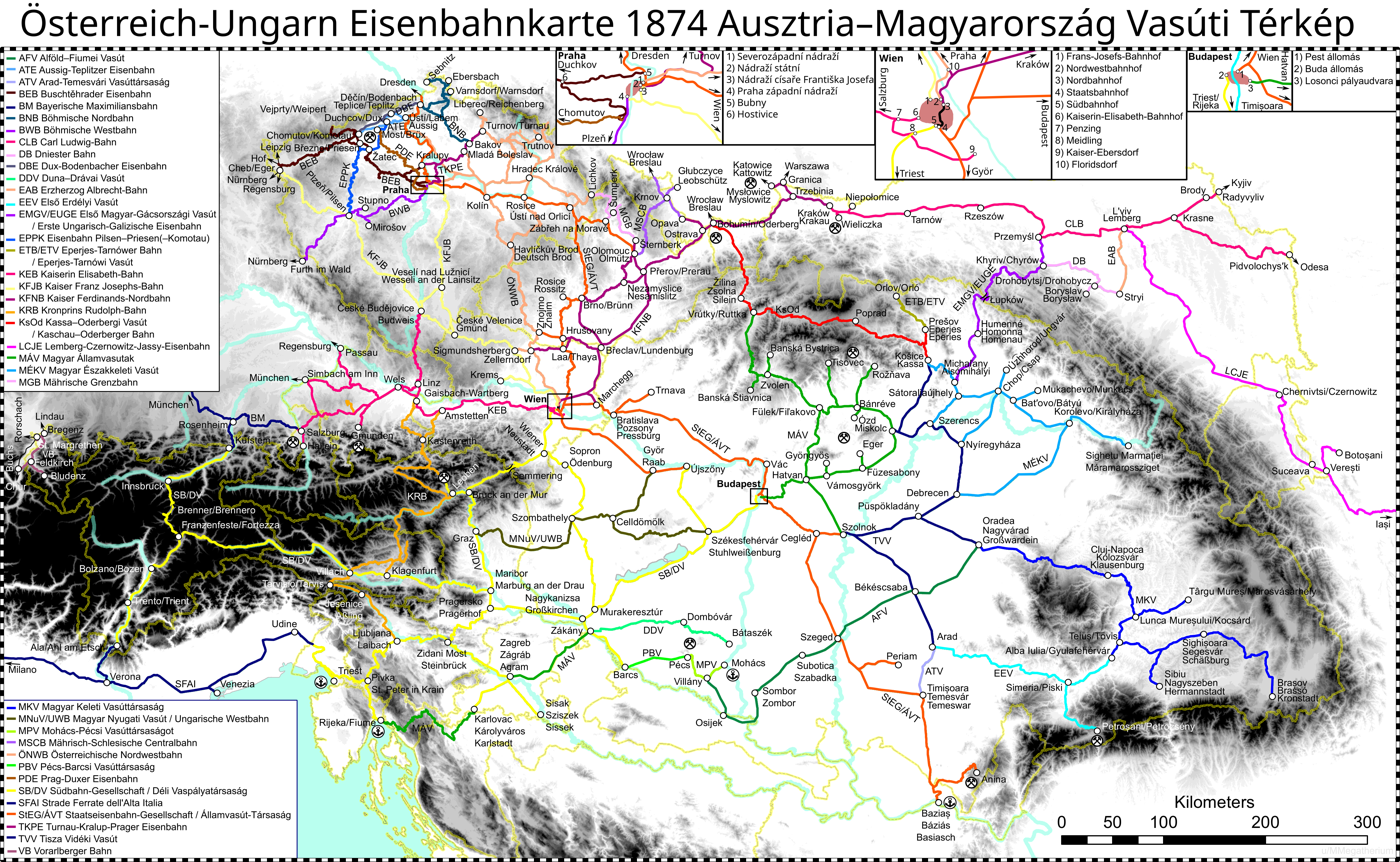
KFJB network in comparison to other railway companies.

The Emperor Franz Joseph Railway (German: Kaiser-Franz-Josephs-Bahn, KFJB) was an Austrian private railway company, named after Emperor Franz Joseph I. It operated railway lines from the Austrian capital Vienna to Prague and Eger (Cheb) in Bohemia.

== History ==
The stock company (Aktiengesellschaft) was founded by the Bohemian noble Prince Johann Adolf II of Schwarzenberg (1799–1888), a brother of former State Chancellor Prince Felix of Schwarzenberg, who had a first 455 km (283 mi) long railway line built from Vienna to Eger, starting after the Austro-Prussian War of 1866. The groundbreaking ceremony was held on November 18 near Schwarzenberg's Frauenberg Castle in Bohemia. The first section between Budweis (Budějovice) and the Pilsen (Plzeň) coal basin was inaugurated on 1 September 1868. It was extended to Eggenburg in Lower Austria on 1 November 1869 and train service to Vienna began on 23 June 1870. The railway line from Vienna via Gmünd to Prague was completed by 14 December 1871. When the northwestern branch was extended from Pilsen to Eger on 28 January 1872, the KJFB network comprised 715 km (444 mi).

In 1872, Vienna Franz Josef Station was opened as the first terminal station inside the former Linienwall in the district of Alsergrund, inside the Gürtel. It crossed the Danube at Tulln and extended from there to Krems and to the border with Bohemia at Gmünd. In Bohemia, it continued through Budweis, Tábor and Benešov to Prague. Prague's present main station originally belonged to the Franz Josef Railway company. Various district capitals are only connected to it by bylines.

The KFJB was nationalized by the Imperial Royal Austrian State Railways on 1 May 1884. After World War I, a new station at Gmünd had to be built in 1919, after part of the town had become part of Czechoslovakia (České Velenice). After World War II, the line lost a lot of importance because of the Iron Curtain. However, trains to Prague and Berlin used it through the mid-90s. Today, the Franz Josef Railway is only used for regional trains, as trains to Prague run via Wien Meidling and Brno, and along the first Czech railway corridor. However there is still a train going to the city of Budweis via Gmünd to this date.

== Lines ==
Sections built by the Emperor Franz Joseph Railway company:

- České Budějovice - Plzeň (1868)
- Eggenburg - Gmünd - Austria/Czech Republic border - České Velenice - České Budějovice (1869)
- Vienna - Eggenburg (1870)
- České Velenice - Veselí nad Lužnicí - Tábor - Benešov - Prague (1871)
- Absdorf - Krems an der Donau (1872)
- Plzeň - Cheb (1872)
- Prague Junction Line: Praha Masarykovo nádraží - Praha hlavní nádraží - Praha-Smíchov railway station (1872)
- České Budějovice - Veselí nad Lužnicí (1874)

== Sources ==
- Siegfried Bufe; Heribert Schröpfer (1991), Eisenbahnen im Sudetenland (in German), Egglham: Bufe-Fachbuchverlag, ISBN 3-922138-42-X
- Johann Stockklausner (1979), Dampfbetrieb in Alt-Österreich (in German), Wien: Verlag Slezak, ISBN 3-900134-41-3
- Alfred Wolf: Die Franz-Josefs-Bahn und ihre Nebenlinien. Sutton Verlag, Erfurt 2006, ISBN 978-3-86680-041-0
