= Maria Gugging =

Suburb of Klosterneuburg, Austria

Coordinates: 48.3125°N 16.2492°E

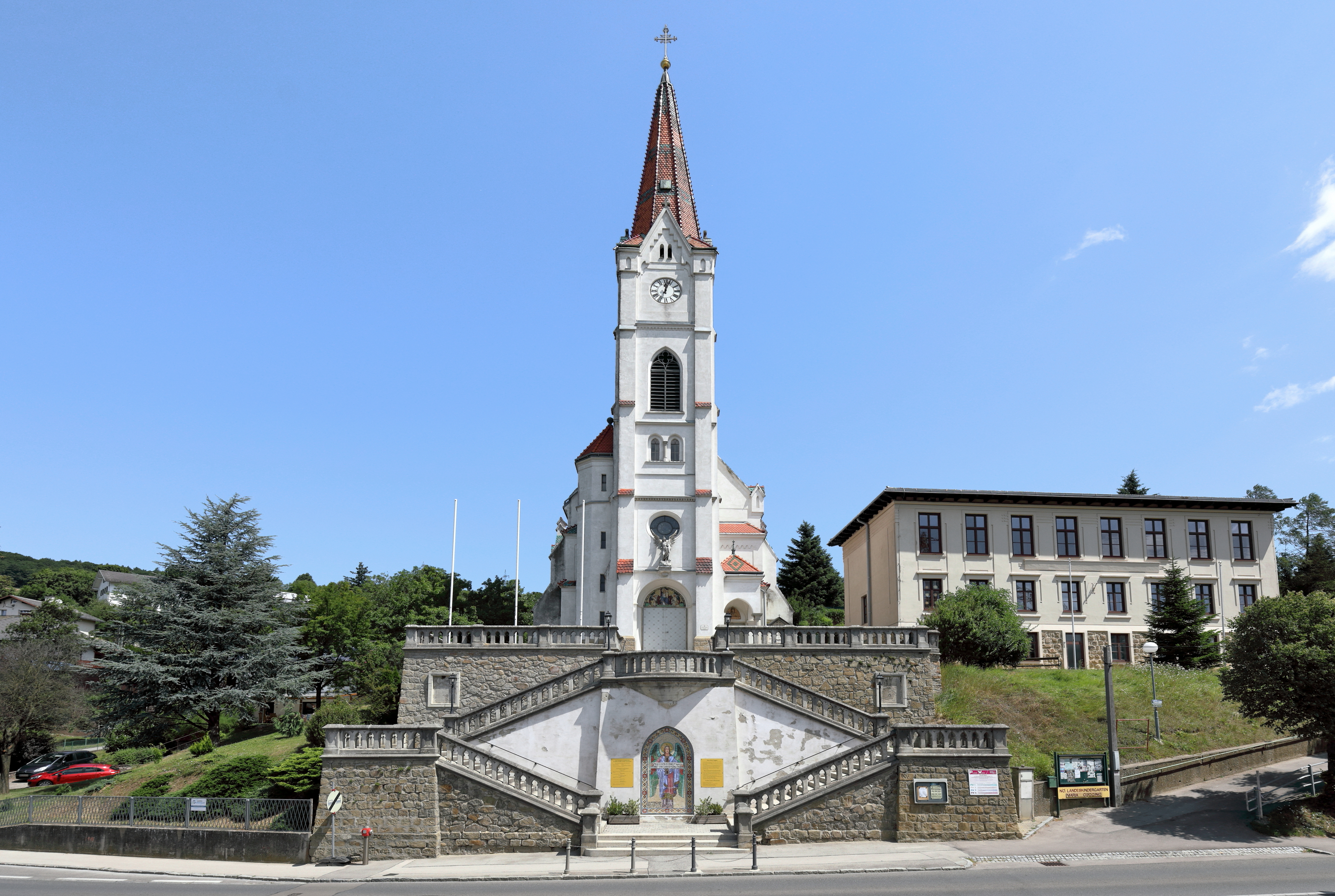
A church in Maria Gugging

Maria Gugging is a suburb of the town of Klosterneuburg in Austria.

It is the site of the former Maria Gugging Psychiatric Clinic, founded in 1889, which is now an art institute known as Gugging.

Nowadays, Maria Gugging hosts the Institute of Science and Technology Austria (ISTA) research institute.
