= Gugging =

Former psychiatric institution near Vienna, Austria

Coordinates: 48.313°N 16.258°E

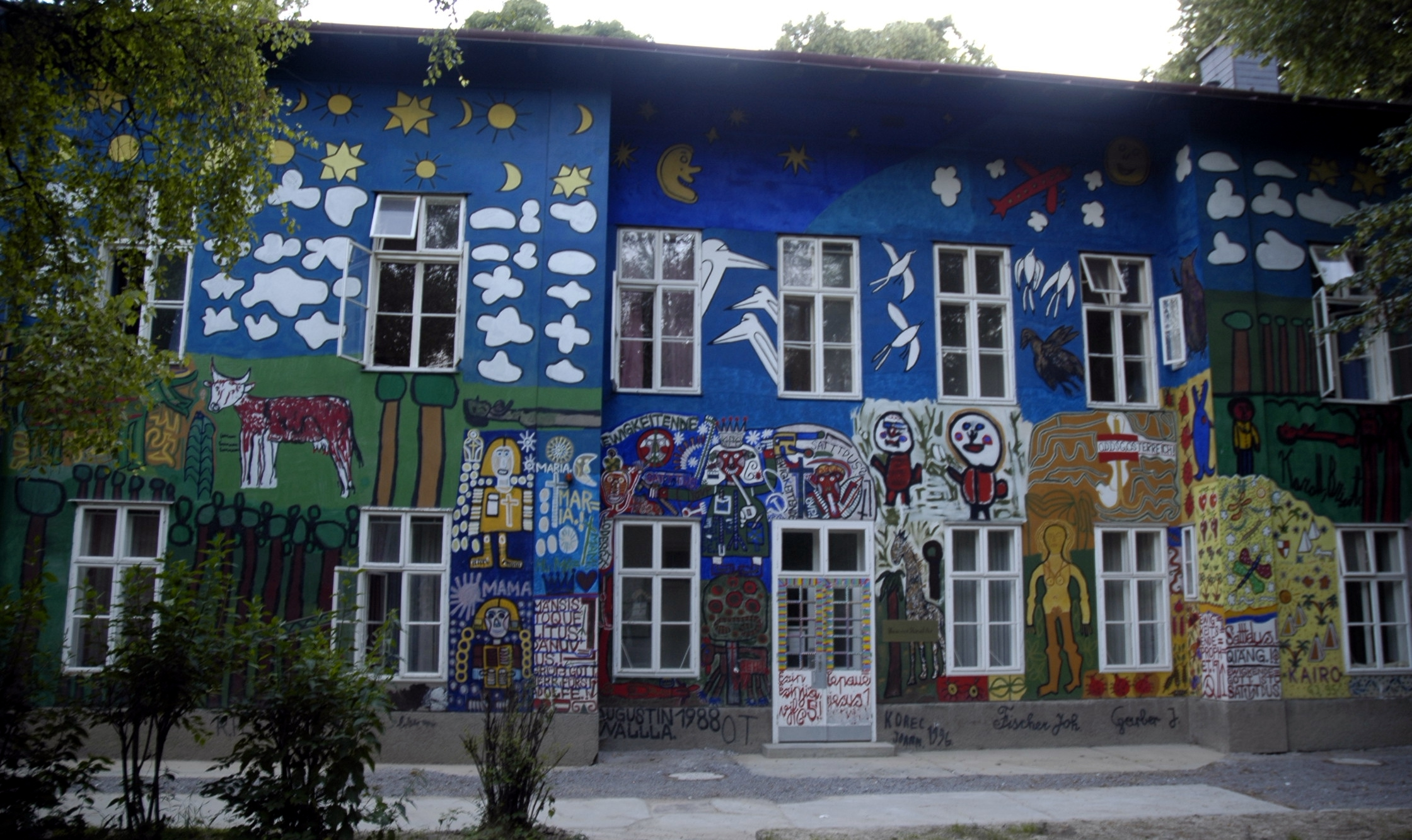
- The Gugging building in 2010

Geography
- Location: Austria

Organisation
- Type: Psychiatric hospital

Links
- Lists: Hospitals in Austria

The Maria Gugging Psychiatric Clinic was a psychiatric institution located in the suburb of Maria Gugging on the outskirts of Vienna, Austria. During the Nazi era hundreds of mental patients were murdered or abused at Gugging as part of the Nazi Aktion T4 program.

In the post-war era, several of its patients became known for their Outsider Art and are referred to as the Gugging Artists. Today, several artists live in a dedicated art center at the former clinic site, known as the Art Brut Center Gugging (or just Gugging). There you can visit the Gugging Museum, which is dedicated to Gugging Artists and international art brut. Visitors can also buy art at the Gugging Gallery.

== History ==
The Maria Gugging Psychiatric Clinic was founded in 1889. It is named after the neighborhood of Maria Gugging, a suburb in Klosterneuburg.

== Nazi atrocities ==
Historian Herwig Czech told the Austrian Press Agency that Gugging was the scene "of some of the most barbarous medical crimes committed in Austria" during the Nazi Regime. Approximately 400 patients were murdered by Doctor Emil Gelny by poisoning and electric shock. Rudolf Lonauer was the attending doctor for 112 deaths and typically murdered his patients – mainly women – with an overdose of drugs. Patients also died from lethal injection, malnutrition, and infectious diseases. New research has also shown that between November 1940 and May 1941 a total of 675 people were taken from the clinic to the Hartheim Killing Facility near Linz, where they were gassed. Of these, 116 were children and teenagers between the ages of four and 17.

By 1940, rumors of patient murders at Hartheim began to spread. Anna Wödl, a nurse and the mother of a disabled child living at Gugging, attempted to save the life of her son by petitioning against his relocation to Hartheim. She was assured that he would not go to Hartheim, but was instead taken to another children's institution, Am Spiegelgrund, where he was murdered soon after arrival.

== The Gugging Artists ==
In the late 1950s, psychiatrist Leo Navratil (1921-2006), of the Maria Gugging Psychiatric Clinic, had his patients produce drawings for diagnostic purposes. The following year he discovered artistically talented individuals in his ward – a finding that was confirmed by Jean Dubuffet, the French artist who coined the term Art Brut (also known as Outsider Art). Navratil's first book Schizophrenie und Kunst (Schizophrenia and Art) was published in 1965. Attracted to the clinic by this work, many Viennese artists visited Gugging. In 1970 the first exhibition of the "Gugging Artists" took place in a Vienna gallery. Thereafter, the "Gugging Artists" were frequently presented in galleries and museums.

== House of Artists ==
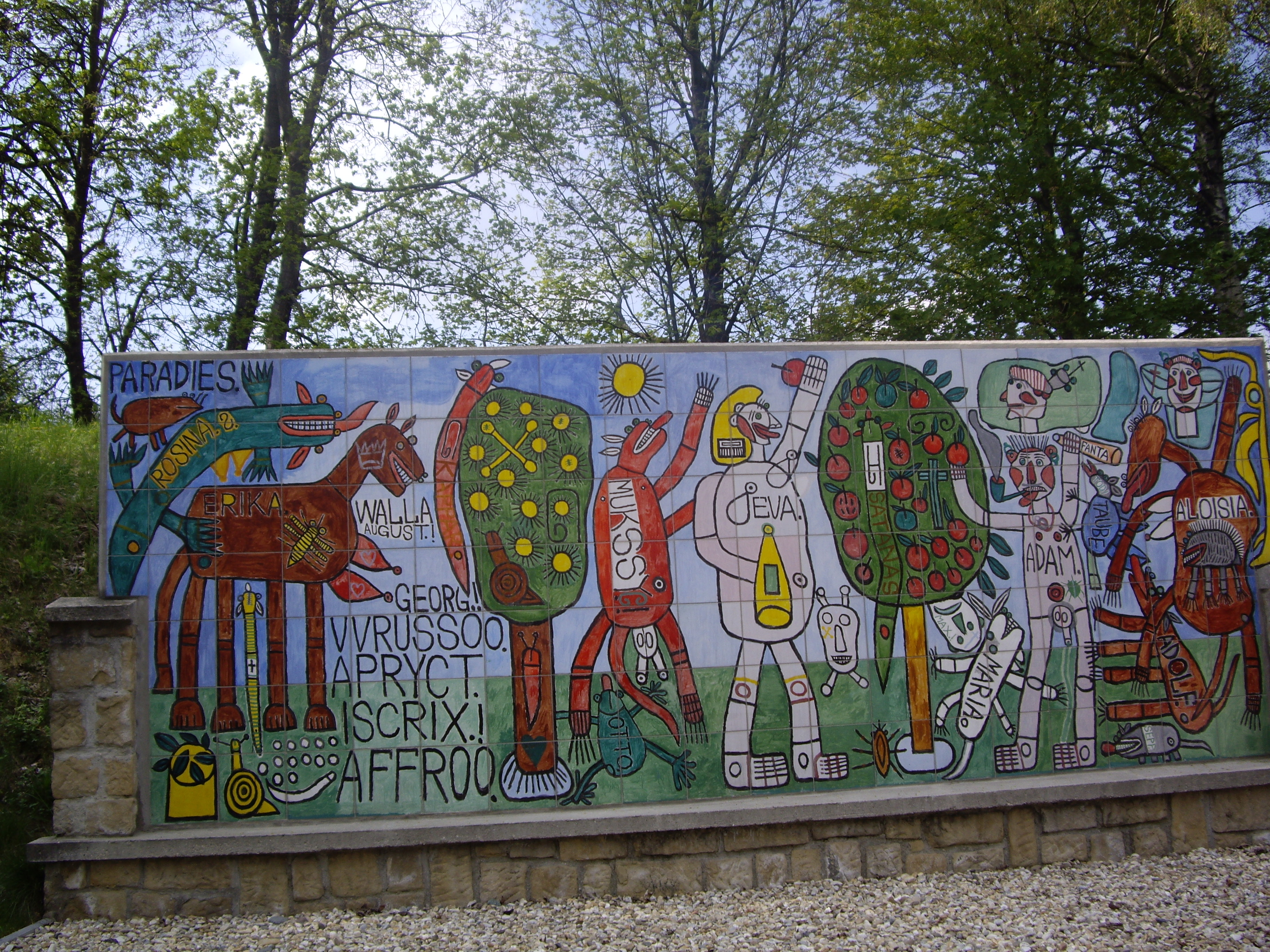
Tiled art in the clinic grounds

The "Center for Art and Psychotherapy" was founded by Navratil in 1981. He invited artistically talented patients to live in the house, which serves as living space, studio, gallery and meeting place. With the founder's retirement in 1986, Johann Feilacher became his successor. Feilacher stressed the role that art played at Gugging and went on to change its name to the "House of Artists" (German: Haus der Künstler). Within Europe, the House of Artists is regarded as a model for psychiatric reforms based on art therapy as a means to reintegrate clients into society.

Presently, a cultural center is located next to the House of Artists. It is known as the "Art / Brut Center", and consists of a museum, a gallery and a public studio. The museum contains the works of the Gugging artists, and also hosts traveling Art Brut exhibitions, which include artists such as Martin Ramirez and Adolf Wölfli. The museum building also hosts a public studio that is open to all, but is mainly used by individuals who have undergone or are receiving psychiatric treatment. Together the museum, the gallery, the "House of Artists" and the public studio, are known as the Art / Brut Center Gugging.

== In popular culture ==
In early 1994 David Bowie and Brian Eno visited the Gugging psychiatric hospital to interview and photograph the celebrated artist-patients famous for their "Outsider Art". Artistic materials favored by the Gugging's residents had a powerful influence on production strategies in the studio during the Bowie / Eno collaboration. In March 1994 a three-hour piece (mostly dialog) further inspired the process of the 1995 concept album Outside.

Philipp Weiss's Ein schöner Hase ist meistens der Einzellne is based on the real-life story of Ernst Herbeck (1920–1991) and August Walla (1936–2001), two schizophrenic artistic patients of Gugging. Projekttheater Vorarlberg performed a production of the play at Alte Hallenbad Feldkirch from December 2013.
