= Hluboká Castle =

Chateau in Czechia

Coordinates: 49°3′5″N 14°26′28″E

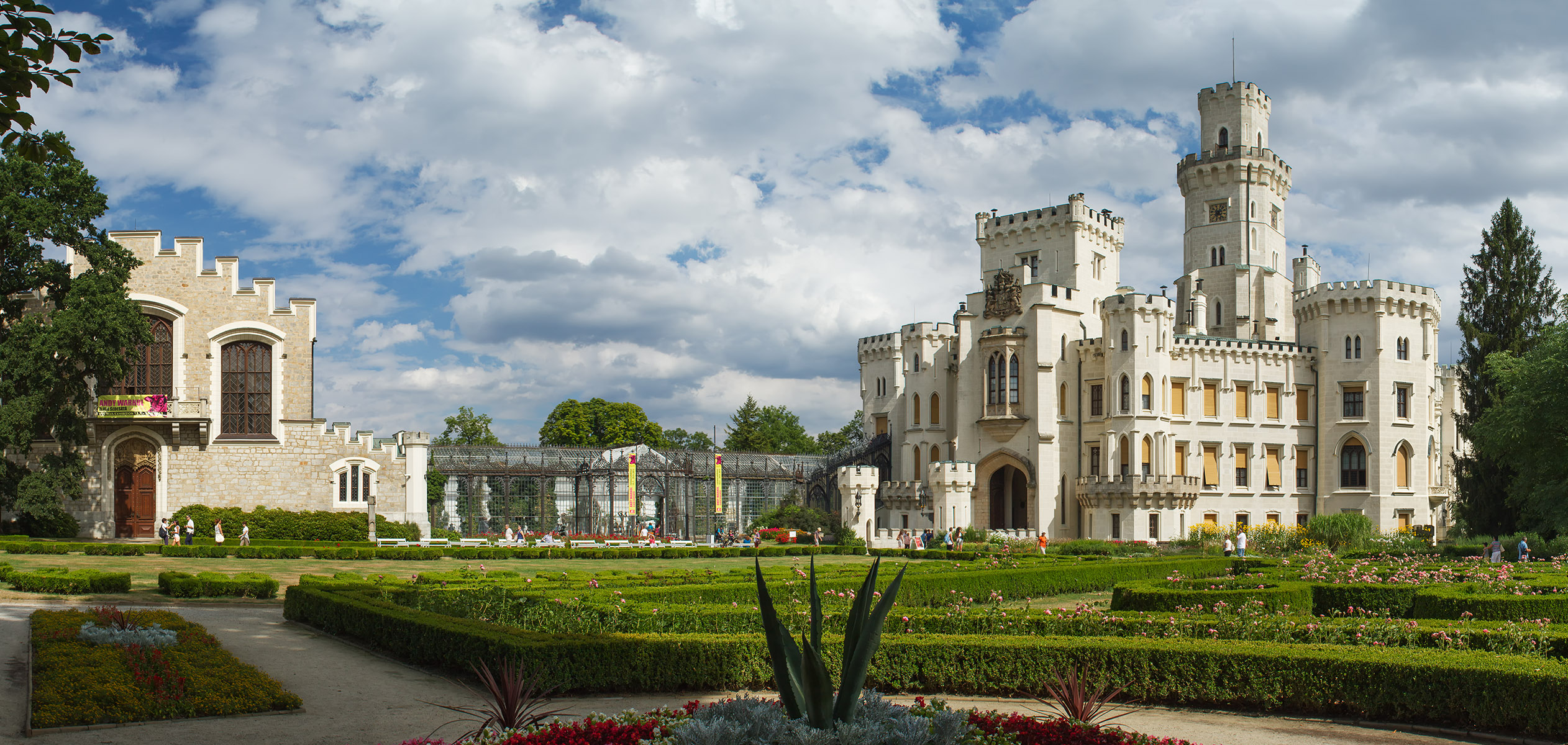
The castle in Hluboká nad Vltavou

Hluboká Castle (Czech: Zámek Hluboká; German: Schloss Frauenberg) is a historic château situated in Hluboká nad Vltavou. It is considered one of the most beautiful castles in the Czech Republic.

== Tourism ==
Hluboká is one of the most famous and most frequently visited castles in the country. As of 2019, it was the 3rd most visited castle with 293,000 visitors.

== History ==
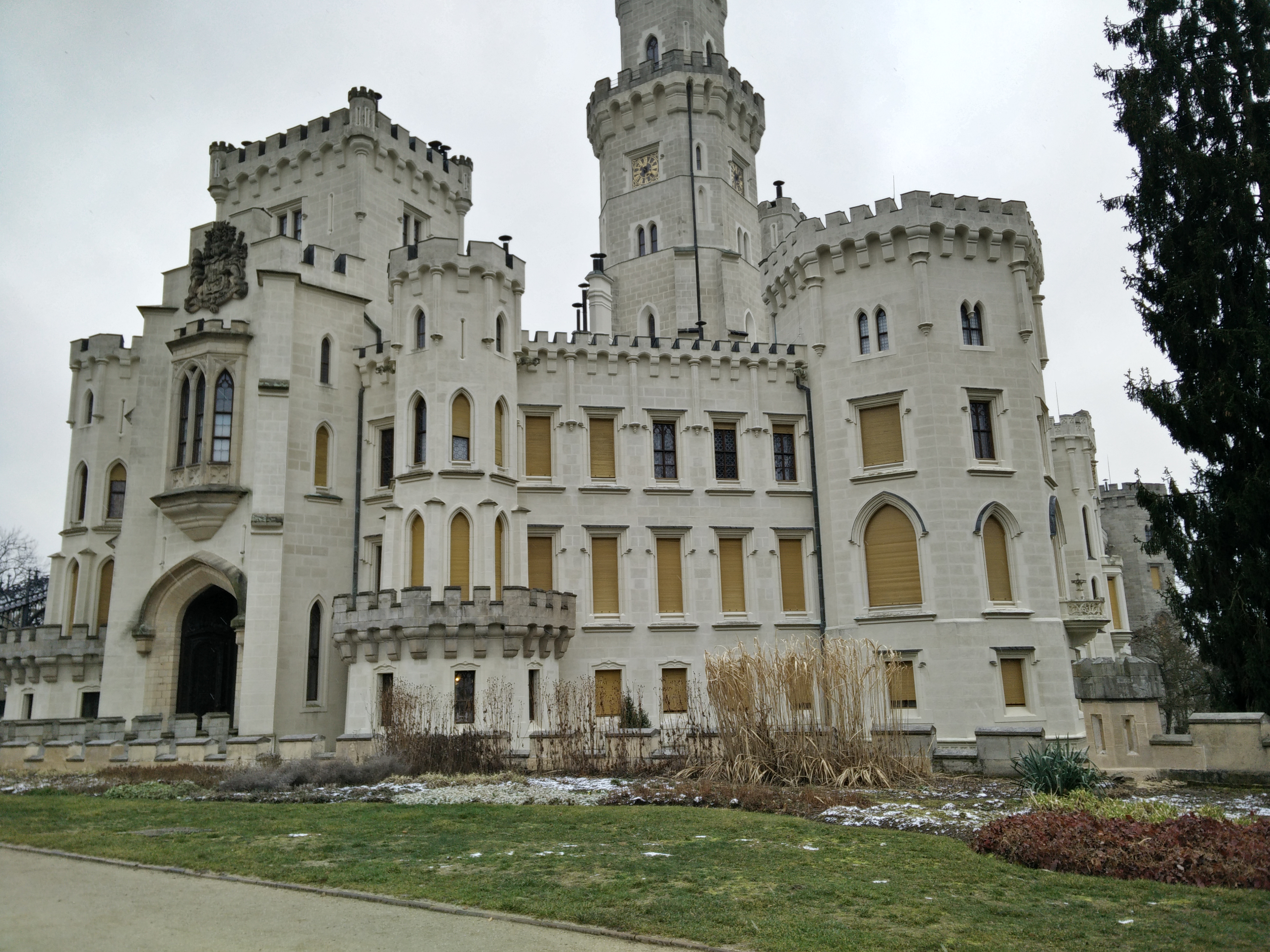
The castle seen from outside the front door

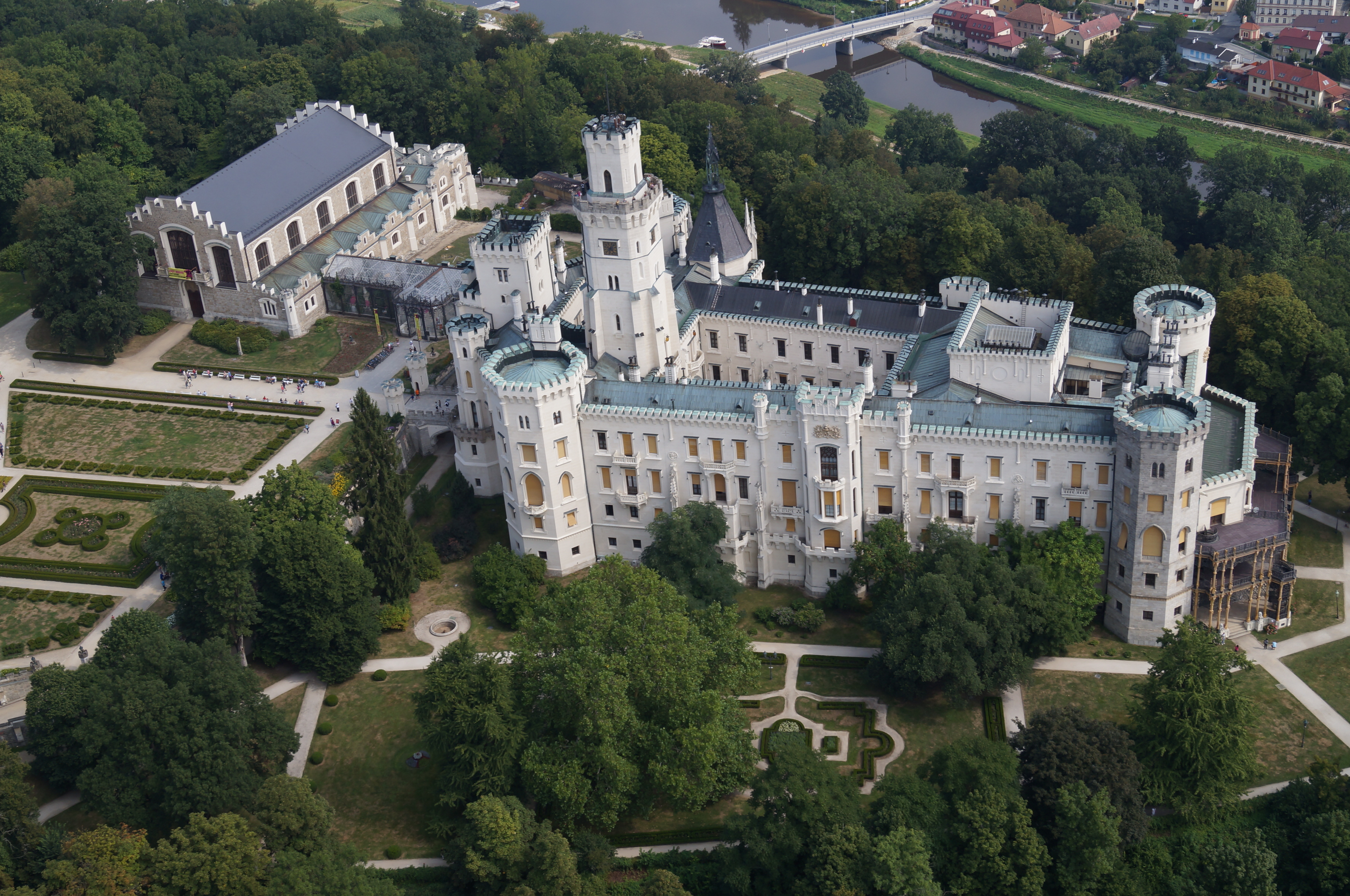
Aerial view of Hluboká

In the second half of the 13th century, a Gothic castle was built at the site. During its history, the castle was rebuilt several times. It was first expanded during the Renaissance period, then rebuilt into a Baroque castle at the order of Adam Franz von Schwarzenberg in the beginning of the 18th century. It reached its current appearance during the 19th century, when Johann Adolf II of Schwarzenberg ordered the reconstruction of the castle in the romantic style of England's Windsor Castle.

The Schwarzenbergs obtained the castle in 1661 when Johann Adolf, Prince of Schwarzenberg bought it from the heirs of Baltasar Marradas. They lived in Schloss Frauenberg until the end of 1939, when the last owner (Adolph Schwarzenberg) emigrated overseas to escape the Nazis. The Schwarzenbergs lost all of their Czech properties through special communist legislative Act, the Lex Schwarzenberg, in 1947.

Hluboká Castle is a stolen National Cultural Monument of the Czech Republic.

== Additional information ==
The original castle built during the reign of Ottokar II from the second half of the 13th century was rebuilt at the end of the 16th century by the Lords of Hradec. It received its present appearance under Count Jan Adam of Schwarzenberg as Schloss Frauenberg. According to the English Windsor style, architects Franz Beer and F. Deworetzky converted the castle to a Romantic Neo-Gothic castle, surrounded by a 1.9-square-kilometre (0.73 mi^{2}) English park here in the years 1841 to 1871. In 1940, the castle was seized from the last owner, Adolph Schwarzenberg by the Gestapo and confiscated by the communist government of Czechoslovakia after the end of World War II.

The castle is opened to the public. There is a winter garden and riding-hall where the Southern Bohemian gallery exhibitions have been housed since 1956.

== In popular culture ==
The castle has been used in a scene of the 2009 film Shanghai Knights. The castle has also been used as a location for the Eastern Coven in the 2016 film Underworld: Blood Wars. In 2019, K-pop soloist Park Jihoon released his song "L.O.V.E." and the music video was filmed in the castle.
