= Exelberg Telecommunication Tower =

Telecommunications tower in Austria

Coordinates: 48°14′56″N 16°14′38″E

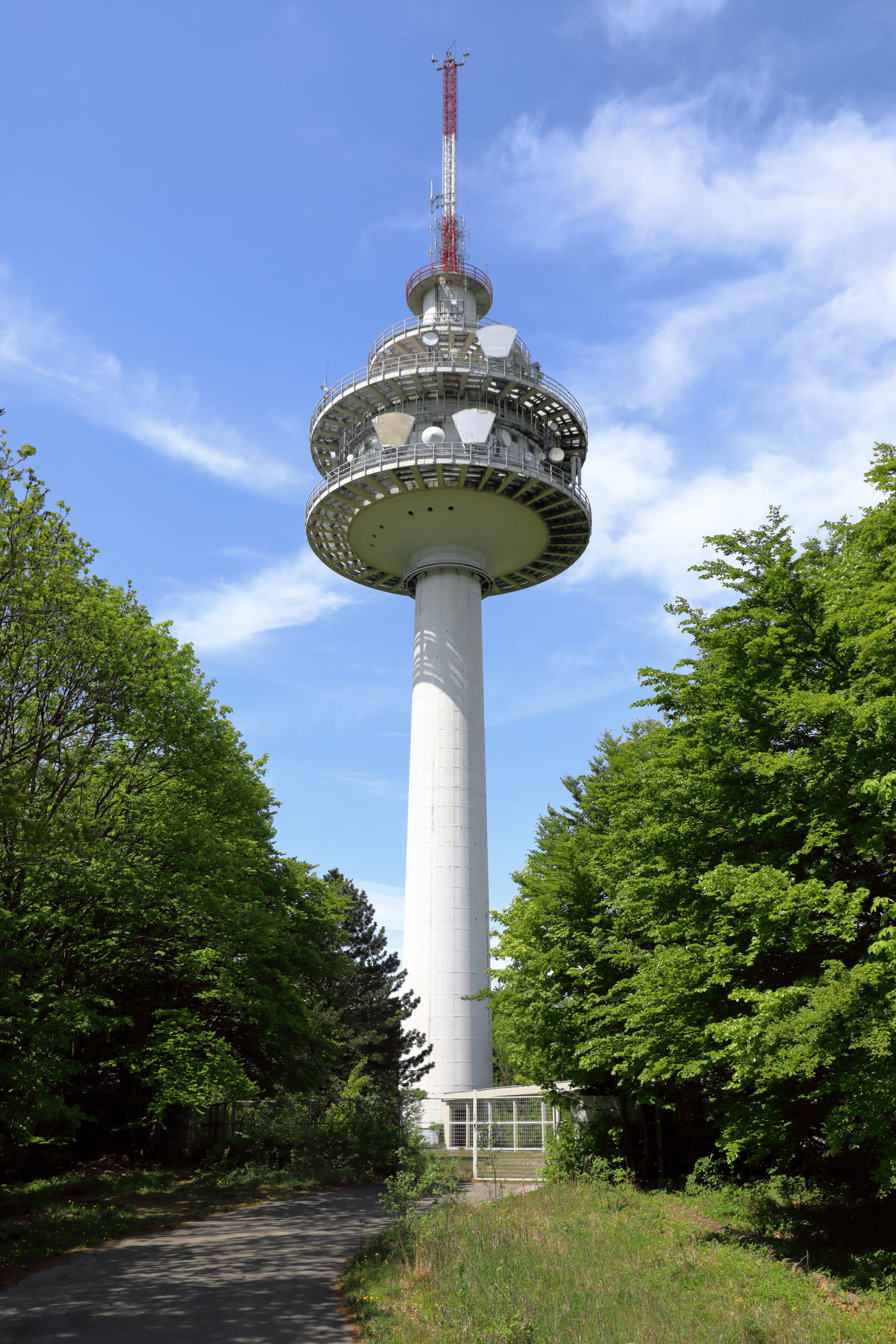
Exelberg Telecommunication Tower

Exelberg Telecommunication Tower is a 358-foot (109 m) tall tower built of reinforced concrete on Exel Mountain near Vienna, Austria. Exelberg Telecommunication Tower is used for directional radio services.

== See also ==
- List of towers
