= August Walla =

- Born: June 22, 1936; Klosterneuburg, Austria
- Died: July 7, 2001 (aged 65); Maria Gugging, Austria
- Occupation: Artist

August Walla (1936–2001) was an Austrian outsider artist.

== Career ==
Walla grew up as an only child with his mother and grandmother. His mother dressed and educated him as a girl, to prevent him from becoming a soldier. Walla later declared that he had been a "Nazi girl" who had been re-operated during the Soviet occupation into a "communist twin". In his works, female figures are often marked with a swastika, while male figures are marked with a hammer and a sickle.

Until the age of 9, he showed normal development and attended a special school. After that, no teaching or job could be found for him. At age 16, he first entered in-patient psychiatric treatment, where he remained until age 20. He returned to psychiatry at age 36 when his mother fell ill.

Walla worked as a draftsman, painter and photographer. In his art, he captured his surroundings by painting invented and existing symbols as well as godlike creatures on objects (even on houses or trees). Figures and symbols can be found in all his works. He created a complete artistic cosmos. August Walla lived in the House of Artists in Maria Gugging since 1983 and was one of the most versatile artists of the so-called "Art Brut".

The well-known German punk band EA80 refers to Walla's work in the piece Gugging of their 1992 album "Schauspiele".

In 2008, "The Gugging Album" by the electronic musicians Hans-Joachim Roedelius and Kava Fabrique Records was a musical homage to August Walla and other renowned artists from Gugging, which were world premiered as part of the new art and music festival "Gugging Irritationen".

In the fall of 2012, the Viennese label Fabrique Records released an audio book in collaboration with Peter Turrini and with selected texts and letters from Walla.

Walla featured as a character in Philipp Weiss's 2013 play Ein schöner Hase ist meistens der Einzellne.
