= Leo Navratil =

Austrian psychiatrist and author

Leo Navratil (3 July 1921 in Türnitz, Lower Austria – 18 September 2006 in Vienna) was an Austrian psychiatrist and author.

He worked in the hospital in Gugging. He called the works, paintings, and texts of his patients "Zustandsgebundene Kunst" (state-bound art). To Navratil, patients make only in the acute stage of their mental illness artistically relevant works. These works have been exhibited in Berlin, Vienna, Salzburg and Heidelberg. Navratil supported the creativity of his patients and showed their works in the art context and published some of their texts. One of his best known artists is Oswald Tschirtner, also known as O.T.

== Books ==
- Die Federzeichnungen des Patienten O.T. (Munich, 1974)
- Schizophrenie und Sprache (Munich 1976)
- Alexanders poetische Texte (Munich 1977)
- Art brut and Psychiatrie, Gugging 1946-1986; Wien: Brandstätter 1999 ISBN 3-85447-876-3
