= Prince Felix of Schwarzenberg =

Austrian prince

His Most Serene Highness Felix zu Schwarzenberg Prince of Schwarzenberg
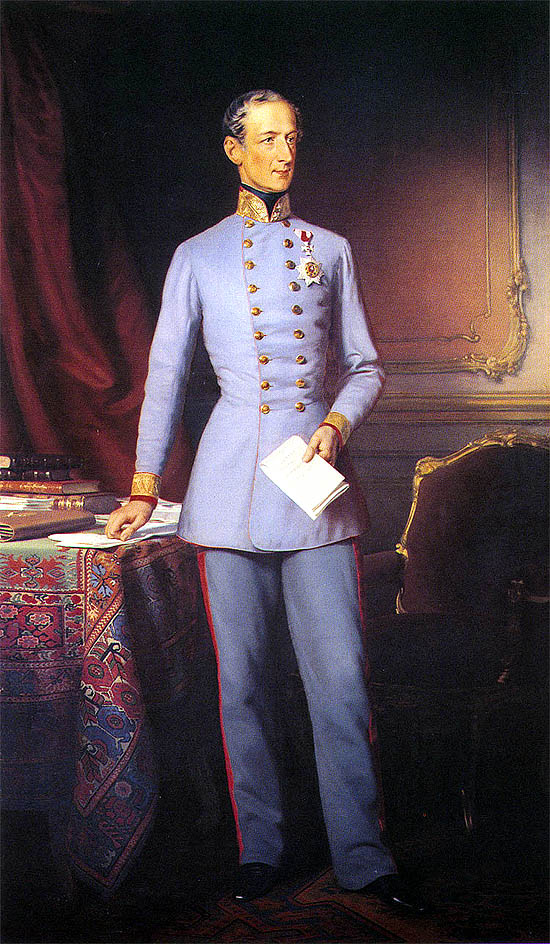

Minister-President of the Austrian Empire
- In office 21 November 1848 – 5 April 1852
- Monarchs: Ferdinand I Franz Joseph I
- Preceded by: Johann Feirherr
- Succeeded by: Karl Ferdinand as Chairman of the Ministers' Conference

Foreign Minister of the Austrian Empire
- In office 21 November 1848 – 5 April 1852
- Monarchs: Ferdinand I Franz Joseph I
- Preceded by: Johann Freiherr von Wessenberg-Ampringen
- Succeeded by: Karl Ferdinand Graf von Buol

Personal details
- Born: 2 October 1800 Böhmisch Krumau, Kingdom of Bohemia, Holy Roman Empire
- Died: 5 April 1852 (aged 51) Vienna, Archduchy of Austria, Austrian Empire
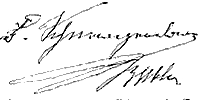
- Signature

Felix Ludwig Johann Friedrich, Prince of Schwarzenberg (German: Felix Ludwig Johann Friedrich Prinz zu Schwarzenberg; Czech: Felix Ludvík Jan Bedřich princ ze Schwarzenbergu; Slovene: Feliks Ludvik Janez Friderik princ Schwarzenberški; 2 October 1800 – 5 April 1852) was a Bohemian nobleman and an Austrian statesman who restored the Austrian Empire as a European great power following the Revolutions of 1848. He served as Minister-President of the Austrian Empire and Foreign Minister of the Austrian Empire from 1848 to 1852.

== Life ==
Felix was born at Český Krumlov Castle (German: Böhmisch Krumau) in Bohemia, the second son of Prince Joseph of Schwarzenberg (1769–1833) and his wife Princess Pauline of Arenberg. The House of Schwarzenberg was one of the most influential Bohemian noble families; his elder brother Prince Johann Adolf II of Schwarzenberg later initiated the building of the Emperor Franz Joseph Railway line from Vienna to Plzeň (Pilsen), while Felix' younger brother Frederick became Archbishop of Salzburg in 1835 and Archbishop of Prague in 1849.

The nephew of Prince Karl Philipp of Schwarzenberg (1771–1820), commander of the Austrian armies in the last phases of the Napoleonic Wars, Schwarzenberg after a short military interlude entered the diplomatic service, where he became a protégé of State Chancellor Prince Klemens von Metternich and served in several Austrian embassies at Saint Petersburg, London, Paris, Turin, and Naples. During his time as a London attaché in 1828 he had an affair with Jane Digby, whom he deserted after causing her then-husband – Edward Law, 1st Earl of Ellenborough – to divorce her, and making her pregnant. This episode led to the nickname of "Prince of Cadland" being applied to him in London.

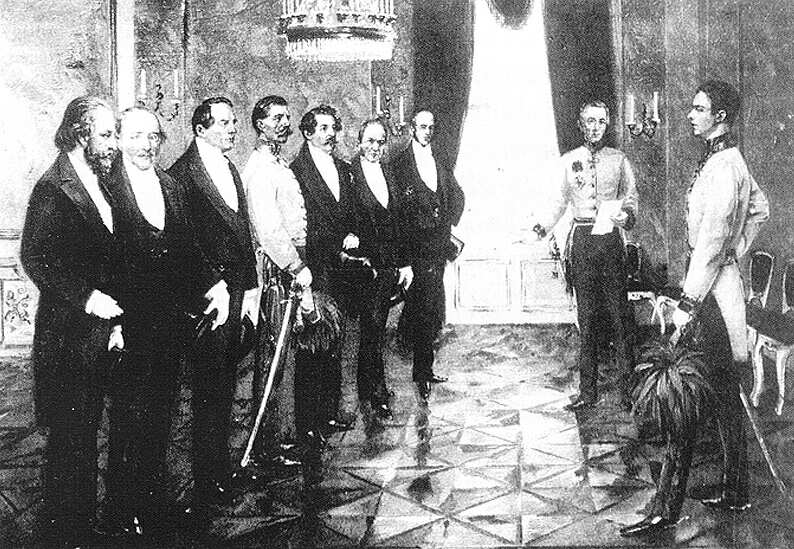
Emperor Franz Joseph I of Austria with Prince Schwarzenberg and Baron von Bach in 1848

Upon the outbreak of the 1848 Revolutions, he rushed to the Austrian Kingdom of Lombardy–Venetia to join Field Marshal Joseph Radetzky defeating the Italian rebel forces of King Charles Albert of Sardinia in Milan. For his role as a close advisor to Radetzky, as well as his status as brother-in-law to Marshal Prince Alfred of Windisch-Grätz, who had suppressed the Czech "Whitsun Riot" in Prague and the Vienna Uprising in October, Schwarzenberg was appointed Austrian minister-president—the sixth within a year—and foreign minister on 21 November 1848. In these offices, which he both held until his premature death, his first step was to secure the replacement of incapacitated Emperor Ferdinand I of Austria by his nephew Francis Joseph. After heir presumptive Archduke Franz Karl had renounced the succession, Ferdinand abdicated in Olomouc on 2 December.

Schwarzenberg formed a new government with conservative politicians like Interior Minister Count Franz von Stadion but also liberal allies like Baron Alexander von Bach, Karl Ludwig von Bruck and Anton von Schmerling as well as the Bohemian federalist Education Minister Count Leopold von Thun und Hohenstein. Learning from Metternich's fate, Schwarzenberg was determined not only to fight, but overcome revolution. Against the perceptions in the Frankfurt Parliament concerning the German question, he advocated the idea of an Austrian-German federation, including all Austrian crown lands in and outside the German Confederation. He delegitimized the Frankfurt assembly by recalling the Austrian delegates and preempted the federalist ideas of the Austrian Kremsier Parliament with the promulgation of the March Constitution in 1849.

Together with the new Emperor, Schwarzenberg called in the Imperial Russian Army to help suppress the Hungarian revolt, and thus give Austria free rein to attempt to thwart Prussia's drive to dominate Germany. He undid democratic reforms and re-established monarchist control in Austria, with the 1849 March Constitution that transformed the Habsburg Empire into a unitary, centralized state. In matters of German dualism, he was able to impose the Punctation of Olmütz on Prussia, forcing it to abandon, for the moment, its plan of unifying Germany under its own auspices, and to acquiesce in the reformation of the old German Confederation. At the same time his government initiated substantial administrative, juridical, and educational reforms.

Schwarzenberg died in office at Vienna, suffering a stroke in the early evening of Monday 5 April 1852.

== Legacy ==
Schwarzenberg achieved substantial respect in Europe as an able statesman (some called him the "Austrian Bismarck"), although he was not much trusted, even by his emperor. His own statement (or alleged statement: according to historian Edward Crankshaw, it is apocryphal) following the Russian intervention in Hungary, that Austria would "shock the world by the depth of her ingratitude" was bitterly remembered in the Crimean War, a war which had the effect of marring his posthumous reputation. Varying between the ideas of constitutionalism and the revival of an absolute monarchy, Schwarzenberg managed to disappoint both liberal and conservative circles. Nevertheless, his intelligence and powers of application were great; and his sudden death has generally been seen by historians as a grave setback to Austria, given that none of his successors in the emperor's reign possessed his European renown or political skill.

The honorary citizenship of Budapest bestowed on Schwarzenberg during his lifetime was officially revoked in 2011 by the local government under Mayor István Tarlós.

== Ancestry ==
Ancestors of Prince Felix of Schwarzenberg

16. Adam Franz, 3rd Prince of Schwarzenberg
8. Joseph I Adam, 4th Prince of Schwarzenberg
17. Princess Eleonora Amalia of Lobkowicz
4. Johann I, 5th Prince of Schwarzenberg
18. Joseph Johann Adam, Prince of Liechtenstein
9. Princess Maria Theresia of Liechtenstein
19. Countess Maria Anna of Oettingen-Spielberg
2. Joseph II, 6th Prince of Schwarzenberg
20. Count Anton Karl of Oettingen-Wallerstein
10. Count Philipp Karl of Oettingen-Wallerstein
21. Countess Maria Agnes Fugger of Kirchberg
5. Countess Maria Eleonora of Oettingen-Wallerstein
22. Count Kraft Anton of Oettingen-Baldern
11. Countess Charlotte Juliana of Oettingen-Baldern
23. Countess Johanna Maria of Schönborn-Buchheim
1. Felix, Prince of Schwarzenberg
24. Léopold Philippe, 4th Duke of Arenberg
12. Charles Marie Raymond, 5th Duke of Arenberg
25. Marie-Françoise Pignatelli
6. Louis Engelbert, 6th Duke of Arenberg
26. Count Louis Engelbert de la Marck-Schleiden
13. Countess Louise Margarete de la Marck-Schleiden
27. Marie Anne Hyacinthe de Visdelou de Bienassis
3. Princess and Duchess Pauline d'Arenberg
28. Louis de Brancas, 5th Duke of Villars, 2nd Duke de Lauraquais
14. Louis-Léon de Brancas, 6th Duke of Villars, 3rd Duke de Lauraquais
29. Adelaide-Genevieve d'O, Marquise de Franconville
7. Louise Antoinette de Brancas-Villars, Comtesse de Lauraquais
30. Alexandre Maximilien Balthasar de Gand-Vilain
15. Elisabeth-Pauline de Gand-Vilain, Princess d'Isenghien
31. Elisabeth Pauline Marguerite Francoise de La Rochefoucauld

== See also ==
- House of Schwarzenberg

== Bibliography ==
- Edward Crankshaw, The Fall of the House of Habsburg, 1963.

Government offices
Preceded by Baron Johann von Wessenberg-Ampringen	Minister-President of the Austrian Empire; Foreign Minister of the Austrian Empire; 1848–1852	Succeeded by Count Karl Ferdinand von Buol
