= Second Battle of Kulm =

1813 battle during the War of the Sixth Coalition

- Part of the German campaign of the Sixth Coalition
Date	10–18 September 1813
Location	Kulm (Chlumec) in northern Bohemia 50.699725°N 13.939653°E
Result	Coalition victory

Belligerents
Austria; Prussia; Russia	France

Commanders and leaders
(Austrian Empire) Karl von Schwarzenberg (Austrian Empire) Eugen von Württemberg (Kingdom of Prussia) Friedrich Graf Kleist	(First French Empire) Napoleon

Strength
120,000	60,000

Casualties and losses
One estimate: Light; Another estimate: approx. 2,000 dead or wounded	One estimate: Moderate; Another estimate: 3,000 dead or wounded 2,000 captured 3 cannon, 1 eagle

The military confrontation, known by such names as the Second Battle of Kulm, the Battle of Teplitz, (Note: Also known under the alternative spelling of the Battle of Toeplitz) or the Battle of Peterswalde, was fought from 10 to 18 September 1813 upon the heights immediately above the town of Kulm (Chlumec) in northern Bohemia, by the Army of Bohemia commanded by the Austrian field marshal, Prince of Schwarzenberg, and a French army under the command of Napoleon. It resulted in a Coalition victory over the French.

== Background ==
After the defeat of the French at the 1st Battle of Kulm on 30 August, the Coalition armies of Prussia, Russia, and Austria commanded by Schwarzenberg bivouacked in Bohemia for a period of approximately a week to recuperate and bring up reinforcements.

Meanwhile, from his military position at Dresden, Napoleon continued to prosecute the war. Aside from Schwarzenberg’s armies to the south in Bohemia, Napoleon was threatened by Coalition armies at Berlin commanded by Bernadotte and at Breslau commanded by Blücher. For their part, the Coalition commanders were attempting to execute a strategic plan during the summer and fall of 1813, to avoid direct confrontations with the French Army when commanded on the battlefield by Napoleon choosing rather to retire and attack his lieutenants wherever they commanded or were positioned. This strategy proved quite successful during this time, as Napoleon’s commanders were defeated in important initiatives in his absence at the Battle of Großbeeren, the Battle of the Katzbach, the 1st Battle of Kulm, and the Battle of Dennewitz. In addition to the battlefield losses, the strategy kept Napoleon off-balance and weakened his core army at Dresden as he frequently led his men out and back in exhausting but useless attempts to go to the aid of his lieutenants.

Continuing to watch Napoleon during the first week of September and again approximately a week later, Schwarzenberg sent forces north on the Pirna Road toward Dresden to conduct reconnaissance. In both cases, Napoleon detected and approached the Coalition forces causing them to withdraw. By that time, the Coalition strategy of avoidance had become evident to Napoleon. In response, Napoleon reorganized his corps in and around Dresden and made the decision to drive Schwarzenberg’s troopers back across the Ore Mountains and force a battle on the plains of Kulm.

== Battle ==
On 15 September, Napoleon made his plans for the consolidated of forces and led his corps south from Gieshibel to Peterswalde causing Coalition forces to withdraw in a disorderly fashion. The following day, Napoleon advanced to the defile and mountain pass at Noellendorf. Protecting Napoleon’s right flank at Geyersberg was Saint Cyr. Schwarzenberg meanwhile had continued his withdrawal out of the mountains south to a point close to Kulm where he repositioned his army to resist Napoleon’s entry onto the plain. Supporting Schwarzenberg’s deployment on the extreme right was Austrian General Meerfeldt. In total, the Army of Bohemia had 120,000 men assembled for battle compared to less than 60,000 for Napoleon.

Napoleon spent the night at Noellendorf and rose early on 17 September to reassess his situation. Although haze and fog enveloped his position, Napoleon made the decision to initiate an attack on the Coalition forces and sent his battalions down the mountain on the road and through the woods. As the French advanced they were fired upon by Russian light infantry and artillery positioned high above the road. Fighting along the road continued until the French infantry, cavalry, and artillery fought their way down to the plain advancing to Doelnitz.

Although the weather had improved somewhat, the full magnitude of the Coalition force was not evident to Napoleon. As the French advance paused, a Coalition cannonade began from several different directions. Later during the course of the battle, Schwarzenberg threatened Napoleon’s flanks by sending a brigade of Prussian Ziethen cavalry through mountain paths to attack the French on the right and concurrently sending the Austrians commanded by Meerfeldt up into the hills on Napoleon’s left near Knienitz in an effort to attack the French from the rear.

As Napoleon responded to these threats by partially re-ascending the heights and using reserves to defend at Knienitz, nightfall and a violent rainfall caused the armies in the field to become obscured. This ended the battle with Napoleon withdrawing back into the mountains to Noellendorf. The Coalition forces chose not to pursue, reforming at Kulm on the plain. No fight occurred the next day and on 19 September, Napoleon’s forces withdrew back to Gieshibel.

== Aftermath ==
Later that month, Schwarzenberg leading the Army of Bohemia and Blücher leading the Army of Silesia would advance toward Dresden forcing Napoleon to withdraw west to Leipzig.

== Citations ==
Preceded by Battle of Dennewitz	Napoleonic Wars; Second Battle of Kulm	Succeeded by Battle of the Göhrde
