= Friedrich, Prince of Schwarzenberg (cardinal) =

Bohemian and Austrian Catholic Cardinal

His Eminence Friedrich, Prince of Schwarzenberg
- Cardinal of the Holy Roman Church, Archbishop of Prague
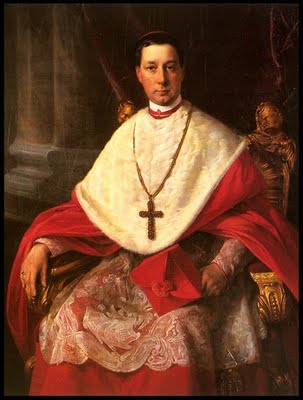
- Church: Roman Catholic
- Archdiocese: Prague
- Installed: 15 August 1850
- Term ended: 27 March 1885
- Predecessor: Alois Josef, Freiherr von Schrenk
- Successor: Franziskus von Paula Graf von Schönborn
- Other posts: Protopriest of the College of Cardinals 1877–1885; Cardinal-Priest of Sant’Agostino
- Previous post: Archbishop of Salzburg (1836–1850)

Orders
Ordination
Ordination history of Friedrich Prince zu Schwarzenberg
History
Diaconal ordination
- Ordained by: Archbishop Augustin of Salzburg (1823–1835)
- Date: 23 July 1833
- Place: Court Chapel, Salzburg
Priestly ordination
- Ordained by: Archbishop Augustin of Salzburg (1823–1835)
- Date: 25 July 1833
- Place: Court Chapel, Salzburg
Episcopal consecration
- Date: 1 February 1836
- Place: Salzburg Cathedral
Cardinalate
- Elevated by: Pope Gregory XVI
- Date: 21 January 1842

Personal details
- Born: Prince Friedrich Johann Joseph Cölestin zu Schwarzenberg; April 6, 1809 Vienna, Austrian Empire
- Died: March 27, 1885 (aged 75) Vienna, Austria-Hungary
- Denomination: Roman Catholic
- Residence: Archbishop's Palace, Prague
- Parents: Prince Joseph II. zu Schwarzenberg and Princess Pauline von Arenberg
- Education: Doctor of Theology
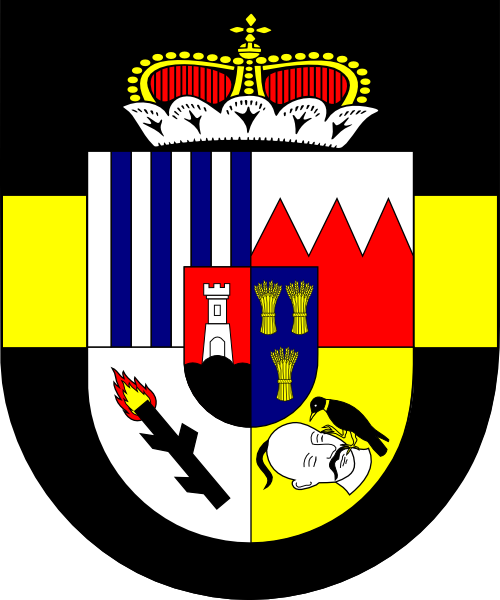
- Coat of arms: Friedrich, Prince of Schwarzenberg's coat of arms

Prince Friedrich of Schwarzenberg (German: Friedrich zu Schwarzenberg, Czech: Bedřich ze Schwarzenbergu; 6 April 1809 – 27 March 1885) was a Catholic Cardinal in Austria and the Kingdom of Bohemia and a member of the House of Schwarzenberg.

== Biography ==
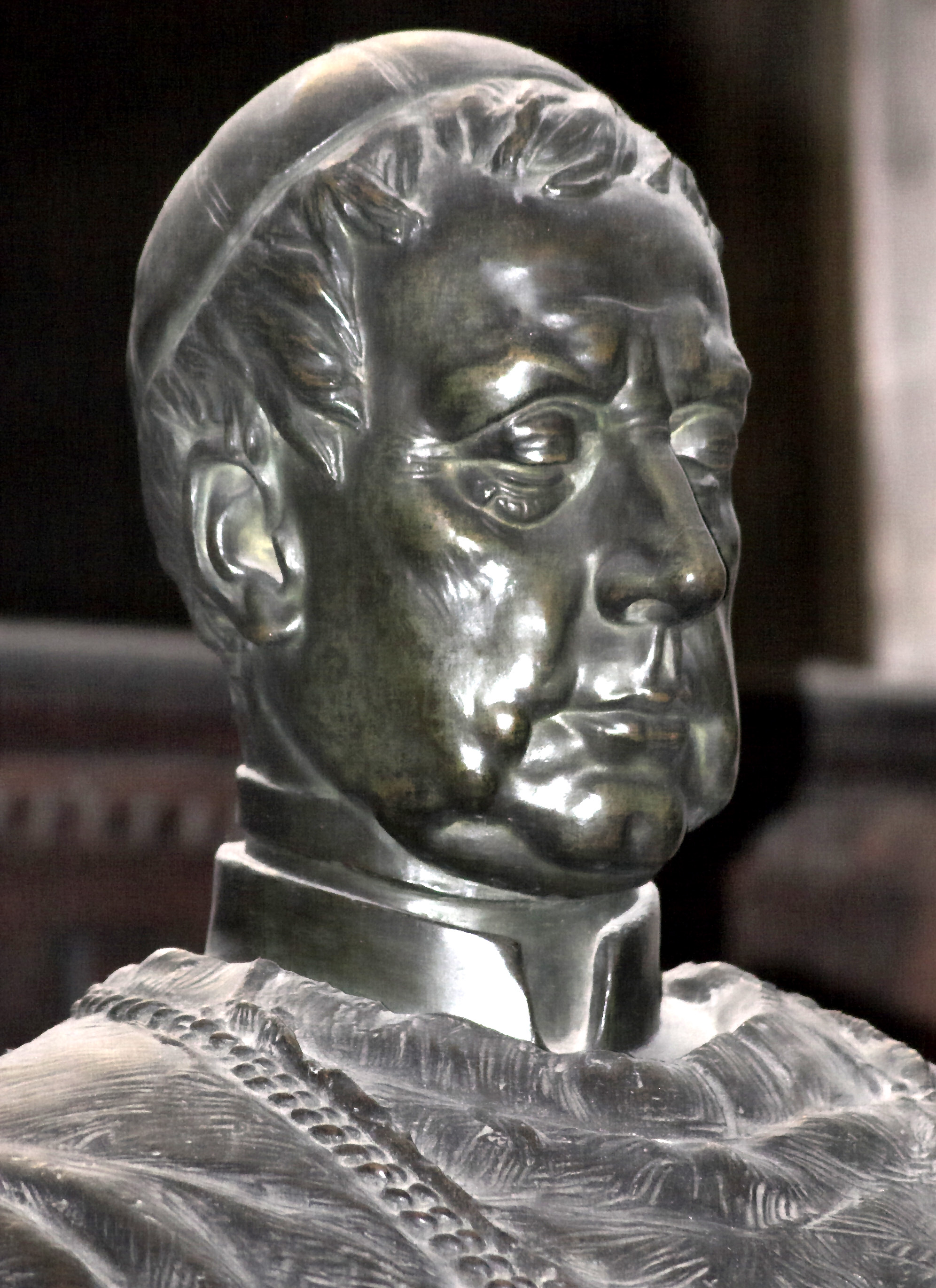
Statue at St. Vitus Cathedral, Prague

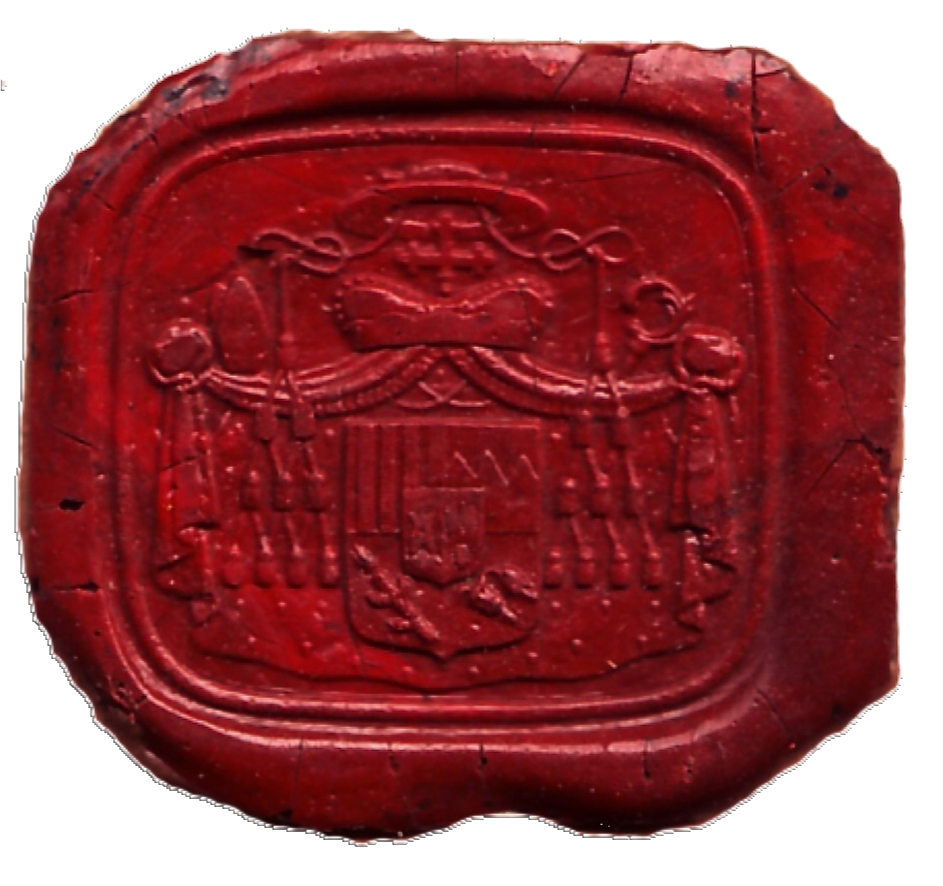
Archbishop's personal seal

He was born on 6 April 1809 in Vienna as the youngest child of Joseph II, Prince of Schwarzenberg and of his wife, Princess Pauline of Arenberg (1774-1810) .His elder brother Felix, Prince of Schwarzenberg was the first Austrian Prime Minister after Vienna Uprising in 1848. He was christened as Friedrich Johann Joseph Cölestin. After his mother was incinerated during a ball given in Paris in celebration of Napoleon's marriage to Marie Louise of Austria, he was placed under the care of Father Lorenz Greif and soon devoted himself to studying for the priesthood. Friedrich began his theological studies at Salzburg but completed his last year of theology in Vienna, where he was ordained to the priesthood at the age of 24. Friedrich was thought so highly of, that a papal dispensation was requested to elevate him to Archbishopric of Salzburg in 1835 even though he was not, according to canon law, old enough.

As Archbishop of Salzburg, his main priority over the following decade was the elimination of Protestantism in his diocese. Whilst he accepted the imperial resolution of 1837 demanding the emigration of Protestants, it turned out that Friedrich was deeply ambivalent because he knew that demanding Protestants to leave in such a way would adversely affect the lives of their families, especially their children. He was also a major patron of the arts and of charities during these years, establishing a major college for the study of music.

He was named a cardinal at the age of thirty-three in 1842 and after the Protestant issue had settled, he turned his focus to improving diocesan government through more regular meetings of bishops, as had been decreed by the Council of Trent. This did not prove a great success and Schwarzenberg was transferred to the see of Prague by Pope Pius IX in 1850, having been elected its Archbishop a year before. During his long period in Prague (1849 - 1885), Schwarzenberg's chief focus was on the relationship between Church and State in the Austro-Hungarian Empire, however the success he achieved in this role was at best moderate.

In 1853, he consecrated his cousin Friedrich Egon von Fürstenberg as bishop, who later joined him in the College of Cardinals.

He did not participate in the conclave of 1846 because it was difficult owing to the prevailing political situation for him to travel to Rome, but participated in the conclave of 1878, when he was one of four men still alive who were already cardinals when Pius IX was elected for the longest papal reign in history. The others were Luigi Amat di San Filippo e Sorso, Fabio Maria Asquini and Domenico Carafa della Spina di Traetto.

== Death ==
He died on 27 March 1885 in Vienna, at the age of 75, after a long period of poor health. Frierich was buried in St. Vitus Cathedral, Prague, Bohemia. He was the last surviving cardinal elevated by Pope Gregory XVI and the last participant in the conclave that elected Pope Pius IX.

== Ancestry ==
Ancestors of Friedrich, Prince of Schwarzenberg (cardinal)

16. Adam Franz, 3rd Prince of Schwarzenberg
8. Joseph I Adam, 4th Prince of Schwarzenberg
17. Princess Eleonora Amalia of Lobkowicz
4. Johann I, 5th Prince of Schwarzenberg
18. Joseph Johann Adam, Prince of Liechtenstein
9. Princess Maria Theresia of Liechtenstein
19. Countess Maria Anna of Oettingen-Spielberg
2. Joseph II, 6th Prince of Schwarzenberg
20. Count Anton Karl of Oettingen-Wallerstein
10. Count Philipp Karl of Oettingen-Wallerstein
21. Countess Maria Agnes Fugger of Kirchberg
5. Countess Maria Eleonora of Oettingen-Wallerstein
22. Count Kraft Anton of Oettingen-Baldern
11. Countess Charlotte Juliana of Oettingen-Baldern
23. Countess Johanna Maria of Schönborn-Buchheim
1. Friedrich, Prince of Schwarzenberg
24. Léopold Philippe, 4th Duke of Arenberg
12. Charles Marie Raymond, 5th Duke of Arenberg
25. Marie-Françoise Pignatelli
6. Louis Engelbert, 6th Duke of Arenberg
26. Count Louis Engelbert de la Marck-Schleiden
13. Countess Louise Margarete de la Marck-Schleiden
27. Marie Anne Hyacinthe de Visdelou de Bienassis
3. Princess and Duchess Pauline d'Arenberg
28. Louis de Brancas, 5th Duke of Villars, 2nd Duke de Lauraquais
14. Louis-Léon de Brancas, 6th Duke of Villars, 3rd Duke de Lauraquais
29. Adelaide-Genevieve d'O, Marquise de Franconville
7. Louise Antoinette de Brancas-Villars, Comtesse de Lauraquais
30. Alexandre Maximilien Balthasar de Gand-Vilain
15. Elisabeth-Pauline de Gand-Vilain, Princess d'Isenghien
31. Elisabeth Pauline Marguerite Francoise de La Rochefoucauld

== See also ==
- Würzburg Bishops' Conference

Catholic Church titles
Preceded by Augustin Johann Joseph Gruber	Archbishop of Salzburg; 1835–1850	Succeeded by Maximilian Joseph von Tarnóczy
Preceded by Alois Josef svobodný pán Schrenk	Archbishop of Prague; 1849–1885	Succeeded by Franziskus von Paula Graf von Schönborn
