= Edmund, Prince of Schwarzenberg =

Austrian field marshal

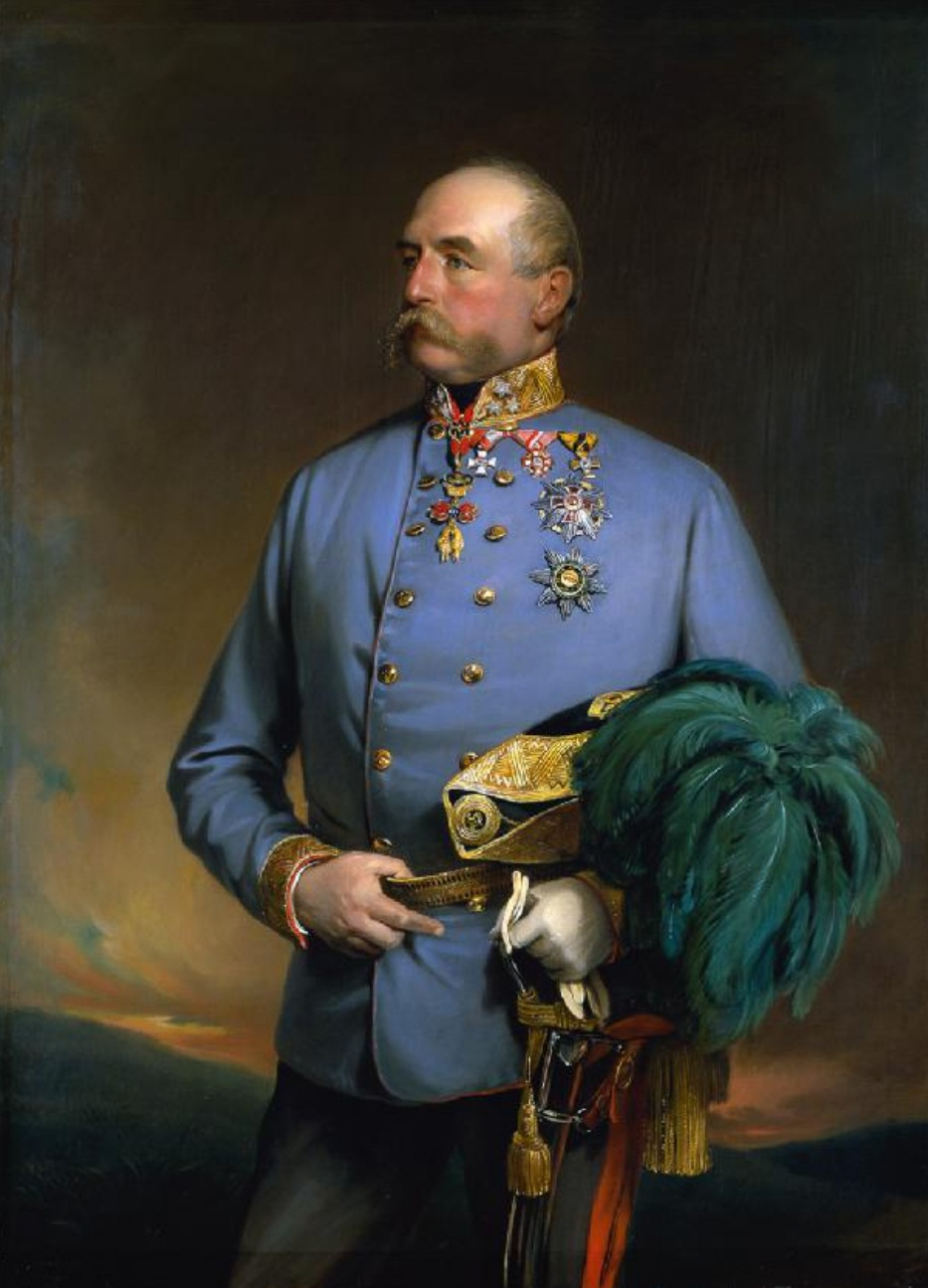
Edmund zu Schwarzenberg, 1848

Edmund Leopold Friedrich, Prince of Schwarzenberg (18 November 1803, in Vienna – 17 November 1873, in Orlík Castle) was the last created Austrian field marshal of the 19th century.

== Life ==
He was the youngest son of famous field marshal Karl Philipp, Prince of Schwarzenberg, who won the Battle of Leipzig in 1813 against Napoleon Bonaparte, and his wife Countess Maria Anna von Hohenfeld (1768–1848), widowed Princess Esterhazy. Edmund entered the Austrian-Hungarian Army in 1821, was colonel in 1836 and major general in 1844. In 1848 he fought in Italy as commander of a brigade under Joseph Radetzky von Radetz. He distinguished himself in the battle for Milan and received, on 4 August 1848, the Knight's Cross of the Military Order of Maria Theresa. Shortly after, he was sent to Hungary, where he took part in the Winter campaign of 1848/49.

At the outbreak of the Second Italian War of Independence in 1859, he commanded the 3rd Armeekorps at the Battle of Solferino. After this, he was commanding general in Austria, Salzburg and Steiermark, until he was relieved from command in 1860 for "reasons of health".

In 1862, he was named Knight in the Order of the Golden Fleece, and on 18 October 1867 field marshal, at the occasion of the inauguration of his father's statue on the Schwarzenbergplatz in Vienna.

== Ancestry ==
Ancestors of Edmund, Prince of Schwarzenberg

16. Adam Franz, 3rd Prince of Schwarzenberg
8. Joseph I Adam, 4th Prince of Schwarzenberg
17. Princess Eleonora Amalia of Lobkowicz
4. Johann Joseph I, 5th Prince of Schwarzenberg
18. Joseph Johann Adam, Prince of Liechtenstein
9. Princess Maria Theresia of Liechtenstein
19. Countess Maria Anna of Oettingen-Spielberg
2. Karl Philipp, Prince of Schwarzenberg
20. Count Anton Karl of Oettingen-Wallerstein
10. Count Philipp Karl of Oettingen-Wallerstein
21. Countess Maria Agnes Fugger of Kirchberg
5. Countess Maria Eleonora of Oettingen-Wallerstein
22. Count Kraft Anton of Oettingen-Baldern
11. Countess Charlotte Juliana of Oettingen-Baldern
23. Countess Johanna Maria of Schönborn-Buchheim
1. Edmund, Prince of Schwarzenberg
24. Count Otto Ferdinand von Hohenfeld
12. Count Otto Carl von Hohenfeld
25. Countess Maria Ernestina Serényi de Kis-Serény
6. Count Otto Franz von Hohenfeld
26. Marquis Scipione Guidi di Bagno
13. Countess Maria Teresa Guidi di Bagno
27. Countess Anna Eleonore von Wrbna und Freudenthal
3. Countess Maria Anna von Hohenfeld
28. Baron Franz Marquard von Stain zu Jettingen
14. Baron Franz Theodor vom Stain zu Jettingen
29. Baroness Anna Maria von und zu Guttenberg
7. Baroness Maria Anna Franziska vom Stain zu Jettingen
30. Baron Johann Werner Schenk von Stauffenberg
15. Baroness Franziska Schenk von Stauffenberg
31. Baroness Marie Sophie von Rosenbach

== Bibliography ==
- Friedrich Fürst Schwarzenberg, Fragmente aus dem Tagebuch während einer Reise in die Levante. Gedruckt als Manuskript von 1837. Wien, Druck von Leopod Grund, 1856. 2 vols, 150, 215 p., 17.5 × 12 cm.
- Constantin von Wurzbach: "Schwarzenberg, Edmund Fürst." In: Biographisches Lexikon des Kaiserthums Oesterreich (Biographical Lexicon of the Empire of Austria). Part 33 Kaiserlich-königliche Hof- und Staatsdruckerei, Vienna 1877, p. 36–39 (digitalised).
- Adolf Schinzl (1891). "Schwarzenberg, Edmund Fürst zu" . Allgemeine Deutsche Biographie (in German). Vol. 33. Leipzig: Duncker & Humblot. pp. 262–266.
- Helge Dvorak: Biographisches Lexikon der Deutschen Burschenschaft. Band I: Politiker. Teilband 5: R–S. Winter, Heidelberg 2002, ISBN 3-8253-1256-9, pp. 388–389.
- E. Wohlgemuth: "Schwarzenberg Edmund Fürst zu (Sekundogenitur)". In: Österreichisches Biographisches Lexikon 1815–1950 (ÖBL). Vol. 12, Austrian Academy of Sciences, Vienna 2005, ISBN 3-7001-3580-7, p. 13 f. (Direct links to "p. 13", "p. 14")
