= Fabian Gottlieb von der Osten-Sacken =

Russian field marshall (1752–1837)

Fürst Fabian Gottlieb von der Osten-Sacken
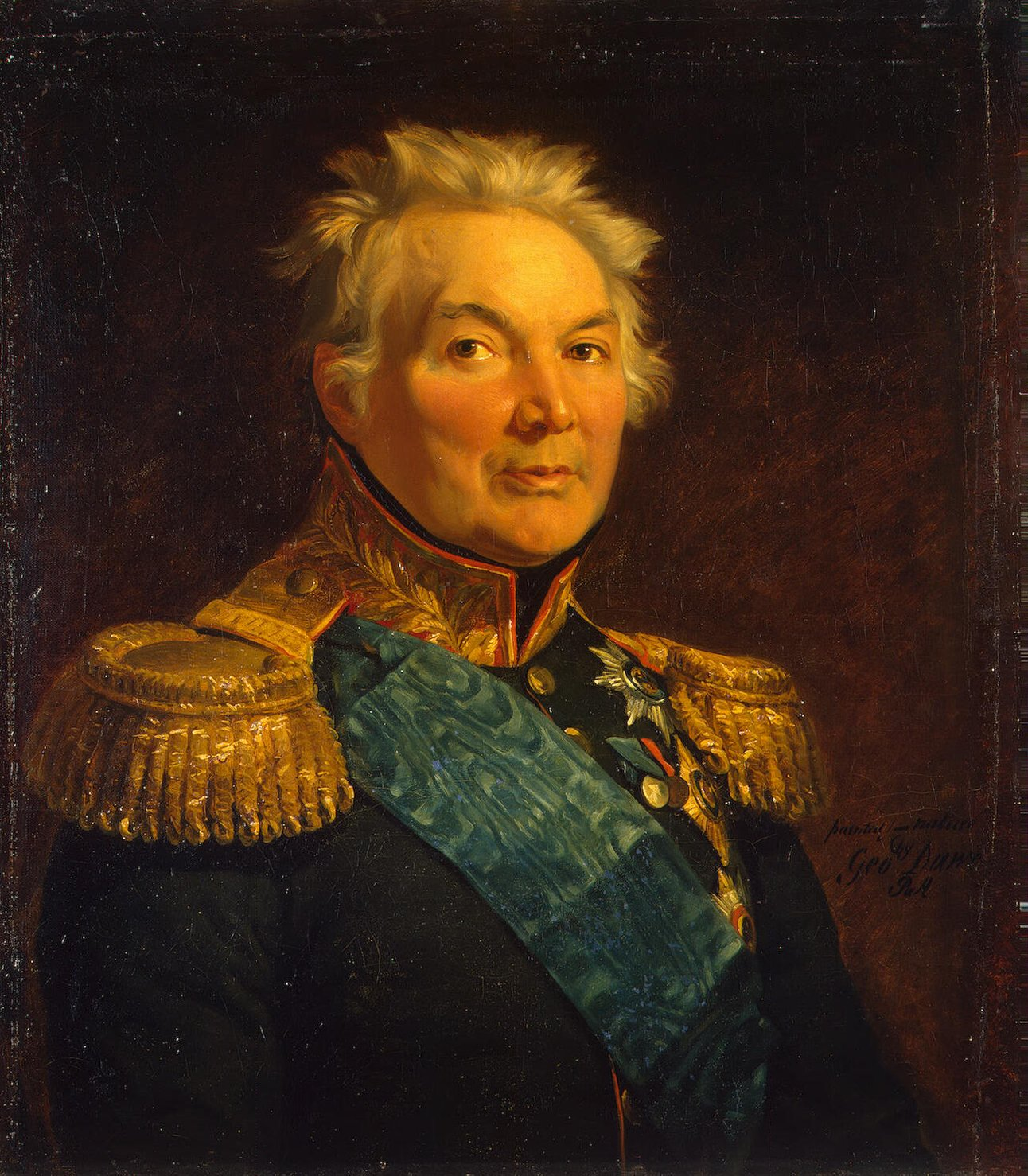
- Portrait by George Dawe, 1820
- Born: 20 October [O.S. 9] 1752; Reval, Russian Empire
- Died: 7 April [O.S. 26 March] 1837; Kiev, Russian Empire
- Other name: Fabian Wilhelmovich Osten-Sacken
- Relatives: House of Osten-Sacken
- Military career
- Allegiance: Russia
- Branch: Imperial Russian Army
- Service years: 1767–1835
- Rank: General-Field Marshal
- Commands: 1st Army
- Conflicts: Russo-Turkish War (1787–1792); Battle of Focsani; Storming of Izmail; Kościuszko Uprising; Coalition Wars; Second Battle of Zurich; Battle of Pułtusk (1806); Battle of Eylau; Battle of Wolkowisk; Siege of Jasna Góra (1813); Battle of the Katzbach; Battle of Leipzig; Battle of Brienne; Battle of La Rothière; Battle of Montmirail
- Awards: 4th & 2nd classes Order of St. George (1792; 1813), Order of St. Alexander Nevsky (1813), Order of St. Andrew the First-Called (1814), 1st class Order of St. Vladimir (1830)

Fabian Gottlieb Fürst von der Osten-Sacken (Russian: Фабиа́н Вильге́льмович О́стен-Са́кен, romanized: Fabian Vilgelmovich Osten-Saken; 20 October [O.S. 9 October] 1752 – 7 April [O.S. 26 March] 1837) was a field marshal in the Imperial Russian Army of Baltic German descent who led the army against the Duchy of Warsaw. He later governed Paris during the city's brief occupation by the anti-French coalition.

== Early life ==
Osten-Sacken was born in Reval in the Russian Empire (present-day Estonia) into a noble family of Baltic German descent. He was the son of Baron Wilhelm Ferdinand von der Osten-Sacken (1700–1754) and his wife, Hedwig Eleonore von Udam (1712–1778). Prior to his death in 1754, his father was a captain-adjutant of Count Burkhard Christoph von Münnich.

== Early career ==
Osten-Sacken was only two when his father died and spent his childhood in near-poverty. He entered the Koporye Musketry regiment as a sub-ensign on 18 October 1766.

In 1769, during the Russo-Turkish War, 1768–1774, he participated in the blockade of Khotin and in other engagements. For his military valour he was promoted in September of the same year to ensign and in 1770 to second-Lieutenant. From 1770 to 1773 he served in the Nasheburgsky Musketry regiment under command of Alexander Suvorov and fought against the Bar Confederation.

In 1786 he became a lieutenant colonel and was appointed to the Moscow Grenadier regiment, serving there until 19 July 1789. He was then assigned to the Rostovsky Musketry regiment and fought in the Russo-Turkish War, 1787–1792. For his contributions during the battles at the Prut River and the taking of Focşani he was awarded the Order of St. Vladimir, 4th class, with ribbon. Later he distinguished himself at Izmail and was praised by Suvorov as "one of those most contributed by his courage and discretion to gaining the complete victory over the enemy."

On 10 August 1792 he was promoted to colonel and from 1793 served with the Chernigov Musketry regiment in Poland. For his participation in an engagement fought near Vilnius he was awarded a golden sword with an inscription for bravery. On 28 September 1797 he became the Chief of the Yekaterinoslav Grenadier regiment with the rank of major general and from 11 July 1799 with the rank of lieutenant-general. After the Second Battle of Zürich he was taken prisoner and interred at Nancy until 1801. Upon his return to Russia, he commanded a reserve corps stationed in the Governorates of Grodno and Vladimir.

== Napoleonic Wars ==
As a result of his actions during the battles of Pułtusk and Eylau, Freiherr von Osten-Sacken received the Order of St. Vladimir 2nd class and the Prussian Order of the Red Eagle. Shortly thereafter, he was prosecuted on behalf of Count Levin August von Bennigsen. The latter's enmity constrained him to resign and spend five years in Saint Petersburg.

When Napoleon invaded Russia, Osten-Sacken returned to military service at the head of a reserve corps, based in Volynia. He was given the task of defending the southern borders of the Empire against the possible invasion by Saxon and Austrian armies. In the battle near Volkovysk (Wolkowisk) he defeated a French corps under General Jean Reynier, and then he was attacked by Karl Schwarzenberg and was beaten. Following Volkovysk defeat, however, Osten-Sacken crossed the border and invaded the Duchy of Warsaw and joining his forces with Count Mikhail Miloradovich, took Warsaw. Later he successfully operated against Prince Józef Poniatowski. Sacken carried out a successful Siege of Jasna Góra (1813). His brilliant conquest of Poland won him the Order of Alexander Nevsky.

During the remaining part of the Napoleonic Wars he participated in the campaigns of the Silesian Army under command of Blücher and was present at the Battle of Katzbach. After this battle he was promoted Full General of Infantry. For his valour in the Battle of Leipzig he received the Order of St. George of 2nd degree. He led the Russian Army in the Battle of Brienne and for the successful defence was awarded the Order of St. Andrew. In several subsequent engagements he commanded the Silesian Army instead of Blücher. Sacken was defeated by Napoleon at the Battle of Montmirail during the Six Days' Campaign.

On 19 March 1814 Osten-Sacken was appointed the governor-general of Paris. During the Hundred Days he served under Michael Andreas Barclay de Tolly.

== Later years ==
At the close of the war, Osten-Sacken commanded the 3rd infantry corps until the death of Barclay de Tolly, whereupon he succeeded him as the commander-in-chief of the 1st army. On 26 August he was admitted to the State Council. On 8 April 1821 he was granted a comital title of Imperial Russia.

Upon his ascension to the throne, Emperor Nicholas I appointed him a chief of the Uglitsky infantry regiment, later renamed the Regiment of Osten-Sacken. On 22 August 1826 Count Osten-Sacken was promoted Field Marshal of the Russian Empire and on 22 September he received the Order of St. Vladimir of 1st degree.

When the November Uprising erupted, Osten-Sacken became the war governor of Kiev, Podolia and Volynia. For his rapid and effective actions, the Emperor bestowed upon him the title of Prince.

In 1835 the 1st army was disbanded, while Osten-Sacken was dismissed from the military service with the reservation of the rank of commander-in-chief and with the right of residence at one of the imperial palaces. He died in Kiev two years later at the age of 85.

== See also ==
- List of Baltic German military commanders
