= Karl Philipp, Prince of Schwarzenberg =

Austrian nobleman and field marshal

Generalissimo Karl Philipp Prince of Schwarzenberg
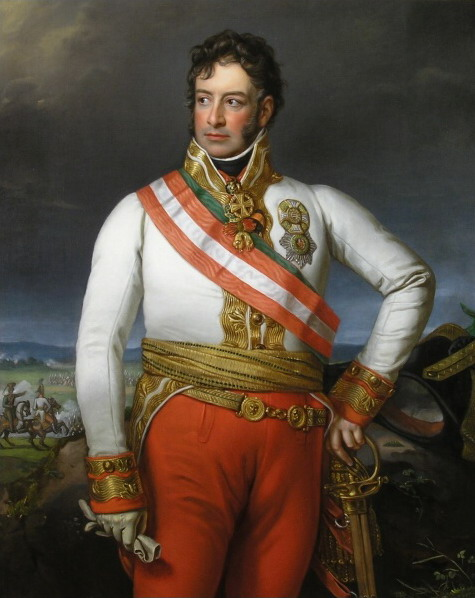
- Portrait of the prince of Schwarzenberg
- Born: Karl Philipp; 18 April 1771; Vienna, Habsburg monarchy
- Died: 15 October 1820 (aged 49); Leipzig, Kingdom of Saxony
- Relatives: Johann Nepomuk Anton of Schwarzenberg (father); Marie Eleonore Countess of Öttingen-Wallerstein (mother)
- Military career
- Allegiance: Habsburg monarchy Austrian Empire
- Branch: Austrian Army
- Service years: 1789–1820
- Rank: Generalissimo
- Conflicts: See list: French Revolutionary Wars; Battle of Le Cateau; Battle of Amberg; Battle of Würzburg; Battle of Hohenlinden; War of the Fifth Coalition; Battle of Wagram; French invasion of Russia; Battle of Gorodechno; Battle of Wolkowisk; War of the Sixth Coalition; Battle of Dresden; Second Battle of Kulm; Battle of Leipzig; First Battle of Bar-sur-Aube; Battle of Mormant; Battle of Montereau; Second Battle of Bar-sur-Aube; Battle of Laubressel; Battle of Arcis-sur-Aube; Battle of Fère-Champenoise; Battle of Paris
- Awards: Order of the Golden Fleece; Military Order of Maria Theresa; Military Order of Max Joseph; Legion of Honour; Order of the Holy Spirit; Order of the Bath; Military William Order
- Selected battles 1800 1809 1812 1813-1814

Karl Philipp, Fürst zu Schwarzenberg (or Charles Philip, Prince of Schwarzenberg; 18/19 April 1771 – 15 October 1820) was an Austrian Generalissimo and former Field Marshal. He first entered military service in 1788 and fought against the Turks. During the French Revolutionary War, he fought on the allied side against France and in that period rose through the ranks of the Imperial Army. During the Napoleonic Wars, he fought in the Battle of Wagram (1809), which the Austrians lost decisively against Napoleon. He had to fight for Napoleon in the battles of Gorodechno and Wolkowisk (1812) against the Russians and won. During the War of the Sixth Coalition, he was in command of the allied army that decisively defeated Napoleon in the Battle of Leipzig (1813). He participated in the Battle of Paris (1814), which forced Napoleon to abdicate.

Schwarzenberg is well-remembered for his participation in the wars against Napoleon from 1803 to 1815. During the War of the Sixth Coalition to defeat Napoleon, Schwarzenberg was a pioneer of the Trachenberg Plan which led to the success at the Battle of Leipzig and later the campaigns against Napoleon on French soil. During the latter stage of the war he won many victories that garnered him fame and reputation as a military commander, particularly during his campaigns in Germany, Switzerland, and France during the war in 1814. The Trachenberg Plan called for avoiding direct battle with Napoleon himself; however, by a twist of fate, Schwarzenberg still ended up facing him. One encounter—the Battle of Dresden (1813)—resulted in a catastrophic tactical defeat for Schwarzenberg, but he also managed to beat Napoleon at Peterswalde (1813) and Arcis-sur-Aube (1814). In the years following the war, Schwarzenberg served as a diplomat for the Austrian Empire and later went on to serve as Austrian ambassador to Russia and also represented Austria at the Congress of Vienna.

== Background ==
=== Family ===
Karl Philipp was born 18/19 April 1771 in Vienna, the son of Johann Nepomuk Anton of Schwarzenberg, who was a member of the cadet branch of the Schwarzenberg princedom and Marie Eleonore Countess of Öttingen-Wallerstein, whose family ruled the region known as the County of Öttingen since the 11th century. Their ancestor Ludovicus de Otingen who was a member of a family that is a relative of the imperial House of Hohenstaufen, who ruled the Holy Roman Empire during the Medieval Age. He was one of thirteen siblings, seven of whom did not reach adulthood. His family descends from the line of the Princes of the Schwarzenberg of the illustrious and noble House of Schwarzenberg, whose lineage could be traced back to at least the 16th century. Their roots began with the Lords (Princes) of Seinsheim in the Middle Ages and they held land and fiefdoms in Franconia and Bohemia. When the founder of the Schwarzenberg line, Erkinger of Seisheim acquired the lands and the castle of Schwarzenberg in the Holy Roman Empire, Erkinger was later made Freiherr (Baron) of the region in 1429. They were at first were made imperial counts by the Holy Roman Emperor and later became counted among the German and Austrian nobility during the 18th century. Later Emperor Francis I of Austria granted a Prince of Schwarzenberg title specifically for Karl Phillip, for his active military service and contributions during Napoleonic Wars. His branch of the Schwarzenberg princedom still continues to this very day. During the early years of his life, Schwarzenberg underwent extensive military training from an early age. Due to his high birth, rank and his family's relationship with the House of Habsburg, he was enlisted in the Austrian army as a lieutenant in 1788 and that same year, he went on to experience war for the first time in his life.

== Early military career ==
=== 1788–1792 ===
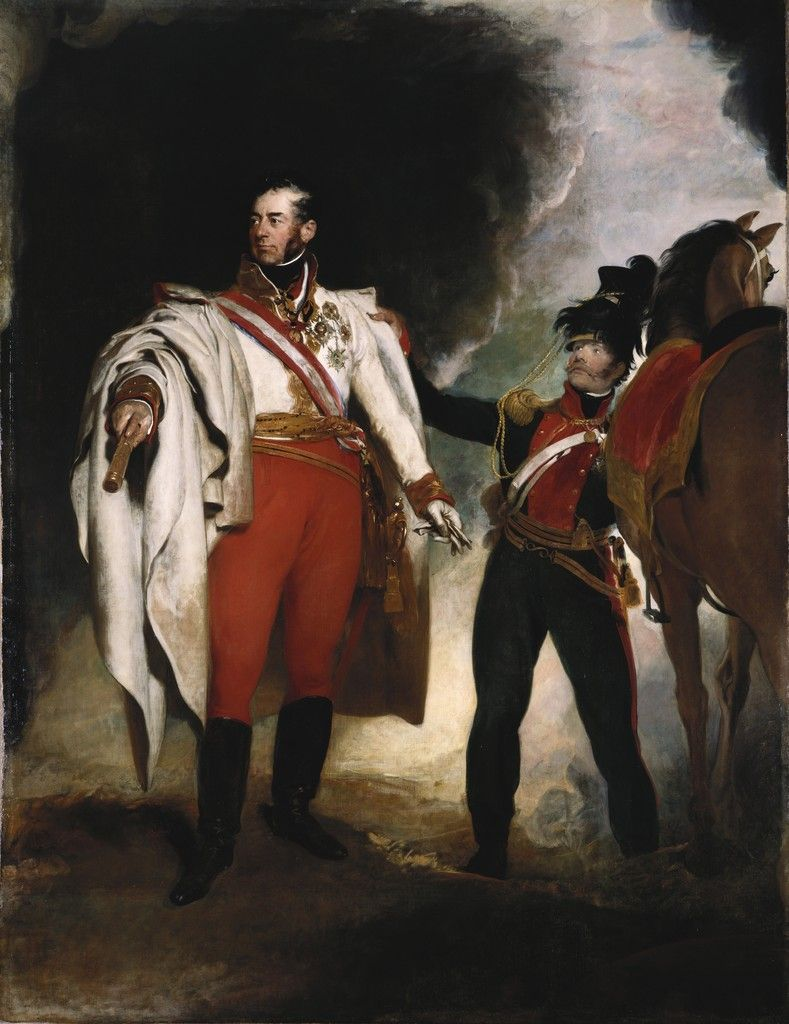
Portrait of Prince Schwarzenberg by Thomas Lawrence, 1819

Karl Philipp entered the imperial cavalry in 1788, fought in 1789 under Austrian generals Franz Moritz Graf von Lacy and Ernst Gideon Freiherr von Laudon against the Ottoman Empire, during the Austro-Turkish War. That war was a result of Russian Empress Catherine the Great and the Russian Empire's aggression against the Ottoman Empire, and as Austria was an ally of Russia, it triggered Austria's open involvement in the conflict. In the war, he distinguished himself by his bravery, and became a major in 1792 and campaigned extensively in the Balkans.

=== French Revolutionary War ===
==== 1792–1801 ====
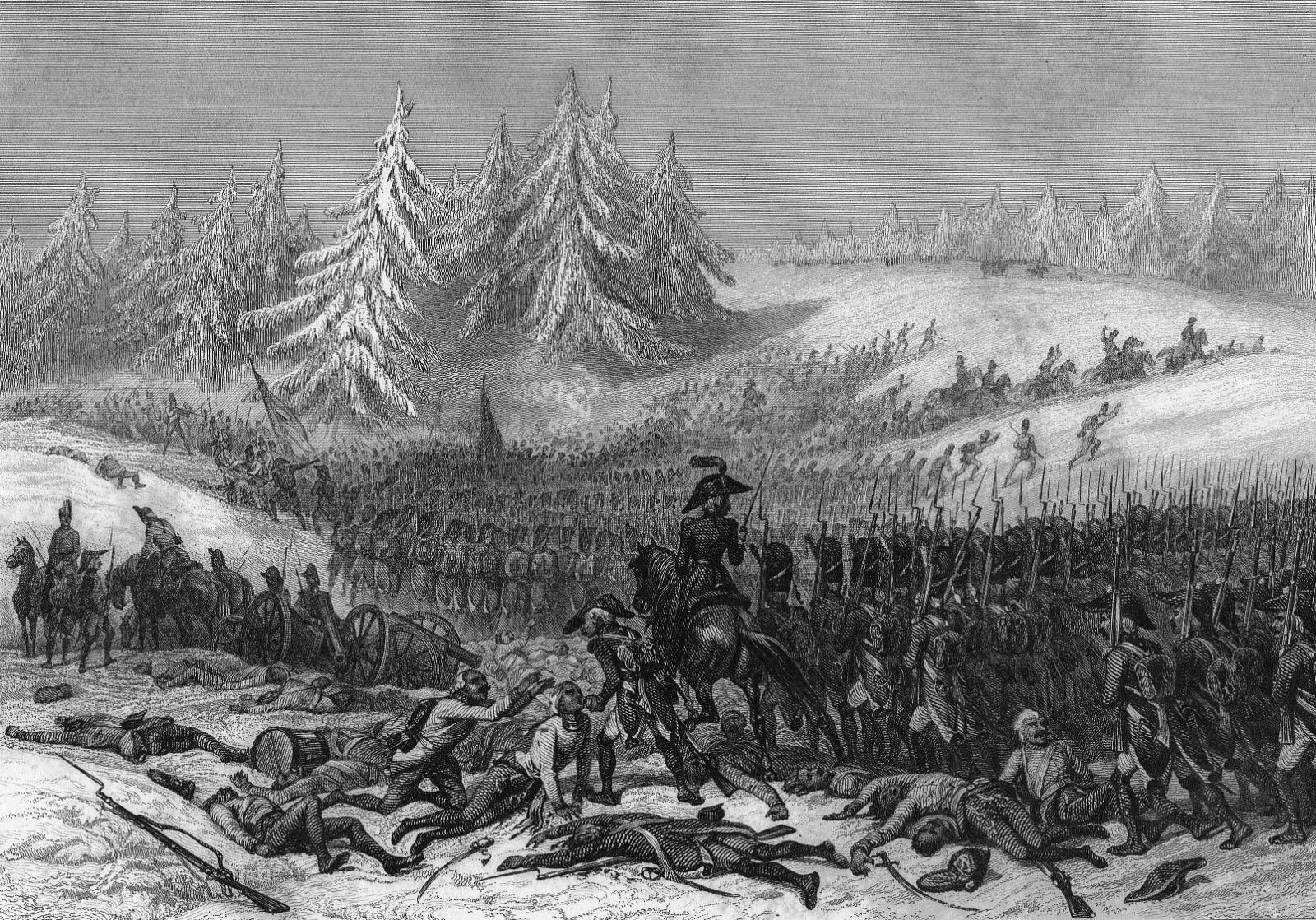
The Battle of Hohenlinden, in which Schwarzenberg participated under the Archduke John of Austria. Though the battle was a disastrous defeat, Schwarzenberg, who commanded the right wing of the Austrian army, where able to retreat in relative safety in good order, thus saving the entire Austrian army.

During the outbreak of the French Revolution, Europe experienced one of the most remarkable political incidents in history, during which the House of Bourbon, the French royal family and its members were executed or fled, which also led to dissolution of the French hierarchical system and also decentralization of power invested in the Church and the Nobility. This resulted in the establishment of a France that came under a republican government led by the revolutionaries. The major powers of Europe opposed the French Republic, fearing that such revolutions might happen in their respective countries, declaring war on France and subsequently invaded the country, thus beginning a conflict that lasted from 1792 to 1801.

==== The Rhine and Low Countries ====
In the French campaign of 1793, Schwarzenberg served in the advanced guard of the army commanded by Prince Josias of Coburg. At the battle of Le Cateau-Cambrésis in 1794, his impetuous charge at the head of his regiment, vigorously supported by twelve British squadrons, broke a whole corps of the French (of around 25,000 men), killed and wounded 3,000 men, and captured 32 of the enemy's guns. He was immediately decorated with the Knight's Cross of the Military Order of Maria Theresa for his conduct.

During the mid-stages of the war, after taking part in the Austrian victories at the battles of Amberg and Würzburg in 1796, he was raised to the rank of general-major, and, in 1799, he was subsequently promoted to Generalleutnant. At the Battle of Hohenlinden (3 December 1800), the Austrian forces under Archduke John of Austria engaged in a decisive battle with the French army under General Jean Moreau, whom the Austrians believed were "beaten". However, the French were not beaten but had laid an ambush for the Austrians and attacked as the Austrians were emerging from the Ebersberg forest. The Austrian left flank was attacked by General Antoine Richepanse's division, leading to a disastrous defeat. During the battle, Schwarzenberg led a division in the right wing. During the retreat, his promptitude and courage saved the right wing of the Austrian army from destruction, and the Archduke Charles of Austria afterwards entrusted him with the command of the rearguard.

After the battle, the Austrians suffered a major setback as well as another defeat at the Battle of Marengo (14 June 1800), which led to the conclusion of the War of the Second Coalition and also led to the Treaty of Lunéville in 1801. As a result of the treaty, the Austrians accepted French dominance up to the Rhine and recognized the French puppet republics in Italy. Two years prior, the French republican government, the Directory, was overthrown in the Coup of 18 Brumaire in 1799, under a certain brilliant and famous French general, Napoleon Bonaparte, who declared himself First Consul and later Emperor of the newly formed French Empire in 1804.
In 1804 Prince Karl Philipp was created Fürst zu Schwarzenberg in a title identical to, but separate from, that of his brother, Joseph II, Prince of Schwarzenberg.

== Napoleonic Wars ==
=== 1805–1812 ===
In the War of the Third Coalition he held command of a division under Mack and when Napoleon surrounded Ulm in October, Schwarzenberg was one of the band of cavalry under the Archduke Ferdinand of Austria-Este which cut its way through the hostile lines. Although Schwarzenberg and Archduke Ferdinand were able to extricate their units, the unfortunate army of General Mack had to surrender to Napoleon's army, which struck a blow to Austria's military morale and led to its eventual defeat. In the same year, Schwarzenberg received the Commander's Cross of the Order of Maria Theresa and in 1809 he was awarded the Order of the Golden Fleece.

In 1809, war once again broke out between Napoleon and Austria, due to Austria's frustration with their territorial concessions to Napoleon and to avenge the humiliations suffered by Austria during previous wars of the coalitions. During the early stages of the war, Austria was successful in defeating Napoleon at the Battle of Aspern-Essling, under the command of Archduke Charles of Austria, and was confident in its victory. Schwarzenberg took part in the Battle of Wagram (July 1809), which the Austrians lost and in which he led a cavalry division in the Reserve Corps and was soon afterwards promoted to general of cavalry.

In 1812, Schwarzenberg signed the Treaty of Paris, making Austria an ally of France. The Austrians were forced by Napoleon to send Schwarzenberg (whom Napoleon held in high esteem), commanding an Austrian corps of around 30,000 men, to the Grande Armée for the French invasion of Russia. He had to show enough commitment to please Napoleon without angering Russia. In the end he failed to protect the Grande Armée from a flank attack at the Berezina. His troops fought bravely and with courage, and he led his armies to victory at Gorodetschna and Wolkowisk. In late November his soldiers withdrew into winter quarters at Bialystok under a verbal agreement with the Russians. Of the 30,000 soldiers who entered Russia under Schwarzenberg's command, 7,000 were killed in battle and another 4,000 died of disease and exposure. Napoleon said in his memoirs, that Schwarzenberg, instead of advancing to Minsk, retreated to Warsaw and abandoned the French army thus allowing Chichagov to seize Minsk. Afterwards, under instructions from Napoleon, he remained for some months inactive at Pultusk.

=== 1813–1815 ===
In 1813, after Napoleon's disastrous invasion of Russia failed, the allied nations, which included Russia, Prussia, Sweden, and Britain, formed the Sixth Coalition against Napoleon. At first, Austria did not join the Coalition, instead trying to negotiate a peace treaty with Napoleon, with Klemens von Metternich the Austrian Foreign Minister being sent to personally meet the Emperor of the French. The conditions set by Austria were that the French puppet states, such as the Confederation of the Rhine and client kingdoms in Italy, be dissolved, Poland be re-partitioned, and the Illyrian Provinces and other French-occupied Austrian territories (since 1797) be given back to Austria. Napoleon refused the deal, considering it a "humiliation" rather than a peace treaty. When Austria, after many hesitations, then joined the coalition against Napoleon, Schwarzenberg, recently appointed to the supreme command the Austrian army, was appointed commander-in-chief of the allied Army of Bohemia, numbering around 230,000 men. This was the first time Schwarzenberg held senior command of a large army in his career and he could now lead this army in ways that he deemed necessary, taking more decisions and deciding strategy for the allies.

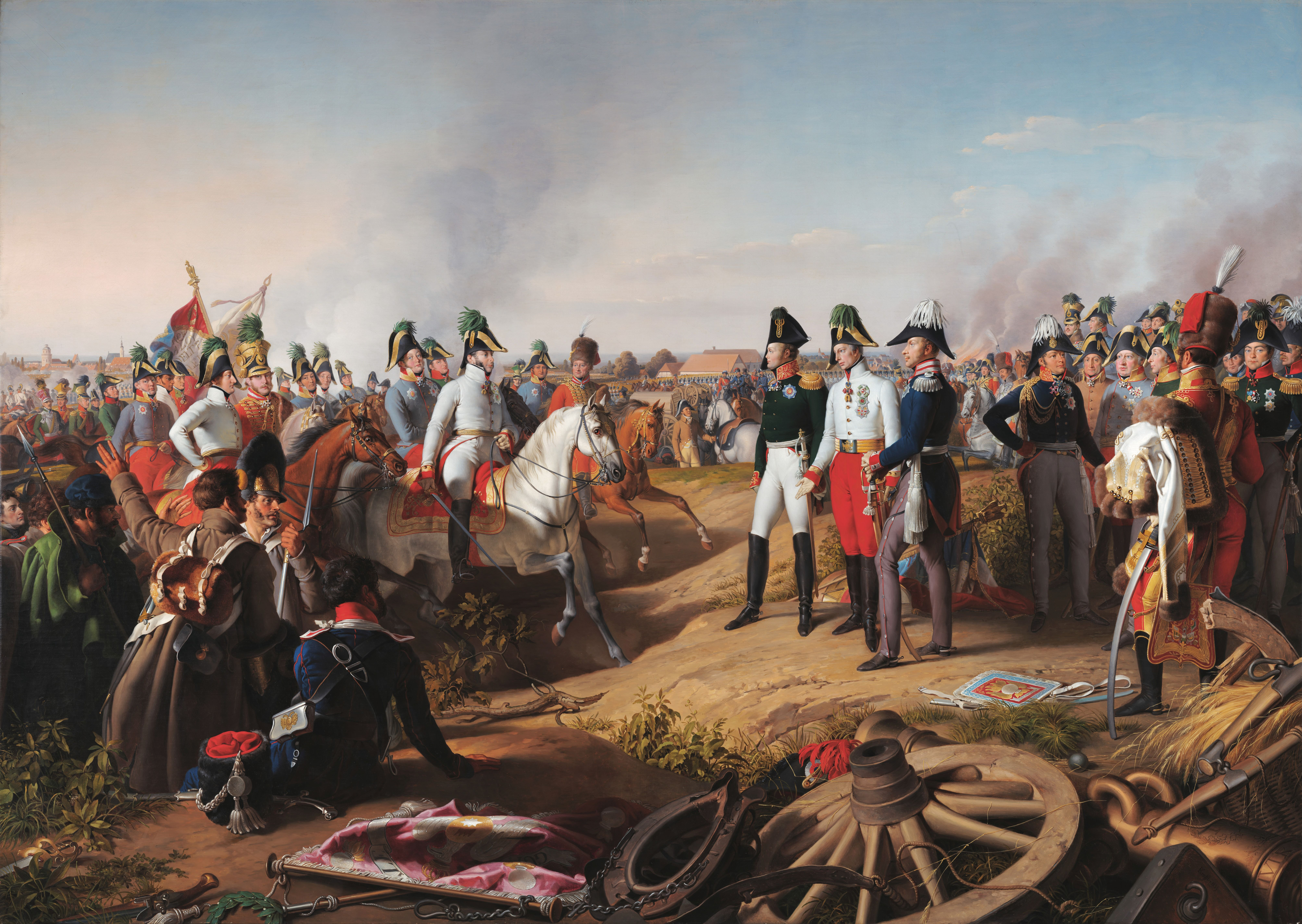
The Declaration of Victory After the Battle of Leipzig Johann Peter Krafft. This painting depicts the aftermath of the Battle of Leipzig, in which Prince Schwarzenberg (on horseback) reports to Alexander I of Russia (right), Francis II of Austria (middle) and Frederick William III of Prussia (left) of the allied victory.

As such, he was the senior of the allied generals who conducted the campaign of 1813–1814. The allies faced many odds, including Napoleon's bold tactics, so the allies were in a dilemma; either to face Napoleon in battle or retreat. The allied commanders then came up with an idea to defeat him in battle and Schwarzenberg was a major pioneer of this strategy, which is now known as the Trachenberg Plan. The idea was that rather than facing Napoleon directly, they would split their respective armies and attack where Napoleon wasn't or when they could combine their armies against him. The plan proved a success and led to several allied victories. Under his command, Schwarzenberg disobeyed the plan not to engage Napoleon directly in battle and the allied Army of Bohemia was mauled by Napoleon at the Battle of Dresden on 26–27 August and driven back into Bohemia. However, his army defeated pursuing French forces at the Second Battle of Kulm (17 September 1813). Returning to the fray, he led his army north again and played a major role in Napoleon's decisive defeat at the Battle of Leipzig, also known as the "Battle of the Nations" on 16–18 October. At the battle, together with the monarchs Emperor Alexander I of Russia, Emperor Francis of Austria, and Fredrich Wilhelm III of Prussia, Schwarzenberg directed the battle and because of the cooperation of the allies against Napoleon at Leipzig, this turned the tide of the war in the allies' favour.

After the Battle at Leipzig, during the invasion of France in 1814, he attacked through Switzerland and defeated a French force at the Battle of Bar-sur-Aube on 27 February. It marked the first in nearly 20 years that a foreign army had invaded the French homeland. He repelled an attack by Napoleon in the Battle of Arcis-sur-Aube on 20–21 March and overcame the last barrier before Paris by winning the Battle of Fère-Champenoise on 30 March. Schwarzenberg's Austrian army, together with Marshal Gebhard Leberecht von Blücher's Prussian army and General Barclay de Tolly's Russian army besieged the city of Paris on 26 March. After a day of fighting, the French Marshals Auguste de Marmont and Bon-Adrien Jeannot de Moncey, realized that all hope was lost and sensing that Paris could not survive a siege by a superior army, surrendered the city to the allied army. The capture of the French capital on 31 March after the Battle of Paris resulted in the overthrow of Napoleon and subsequently his abdication at the Treaty of Fontainebleau signed on 11 April. This eventually led to Napoleon's brief exile in the island of Elba in 1814. The capture of Paris successfully ended Napoleon's rule and domination of Europe, and after, the Great Powers began the rebuilding of Europe's political and geographic structure at the Congress of Vienna.

The next year, during the Hundred Days, when Napoleon escaped from Elba and regained the French throne, Schwarzenberg commanded the Army of the Upper Rhine (an Austrian-allied army of about a quarter of a million men) in the hostilities that followed. However, as the allies amassed their forces, the Austrians did not have to fight a single battle, because the Anglo-Allied Army, under the Duke of Wellington and the Prussians under Field Marshal Blücher, jointly defeated Napoleon at the Battle of Waterloo in June 1815. Thus the twenty year period of instability and conflict in Europe came to an end and the Congress of Vienna was able to complete its work. The agreements and conditions of the congress led to the redrawing of the map of Europe and creating a new balance power between the great powers of the continent, aiming to prevent further major conflicts in Europe. This turned out to be successful and led to a period of relative calm and peace between the European nations for half a century.

== Diplomatic career ==
During 1806–1809 Schwarzenberg served as the Austrian ambassador to Russia. He had previously served as the ambassador to France from 1809 to 1814.

In the aftermath of the War of the Fifth Coalition (1809), in which Austria suffered a crushing defeat and was forced give up lands in Illyria, Salzburg, and Galicia as recompense, Schwarzenberg participated in the signing of Treaty of Schönbrunn (14 October 1809). In 1810, he was sent to Paris as ambassador to negotiate the 1810 marriage between Napoleon and the Archduchess Marie Louise of Austria. The prince gave a ball in honour of the bride on 1 July 1810, which ended in a fire that killed many of the guests, including his own sister-in-law, wife of his older brother, Joseph.

Karl Philipp, Prince of Schwarzenberg by an unknown artist.

=== Illness ===
After the French Revolutionary and Napoleonic wars ended, Schwarzenberg's health steadily declined. Shortly afterwards, in 1816, having lost his sister Caroline, to whom he was deeply attached, he fell ill. A stroke disabled him in 1817 and in 1820, when revisiting Leipzig (the scene of the "Battle of the Nations" that he had directed seven years before) he suffered a second stroke. He died there on 15 October. At the news of his death, the Austrian Empire held three days of mourning for the great general and "Victor of Leipzig". Even Emperor Alexander I of Russia said that:

"Europe has lost a hero and I a friend, one that I would miss as long as I live."

== Marriage and descendants ==
The Prince married the Countess Maria Anna von Hohenfeld (20 May 1767–1848), who was the widow of Prince Anton Esterhazy von Galantha. They had three sons:

- Friedrich, Prince of Schwarzenberg (1800–70), his eldest son, had an adventurous career as a soldier, and described his wanderings and campaigns in several interesting works, of which the best known is his Wanderungen eines Lanzknechtes (1844–1845). He took part as an Austrian officer in the suppression of the Kraków uprising in 1846, the First Italian War of Independence and Hungarian Revolution of 1848 in 1848, and as an amateur in the French conquest of Algeria, the Carlist Wars in Spain and the Swiss civil war of the Sonderbund. He became a major-general in the Austrian army in 1849, and died after many years of well-filled leisure in 1870.
- Karl II Borromäus Philipp (1802–1858), the second son, was a Feldzeugmeister, and Governor of Transylvania (1851-1858).
- Edmund Leopold Friedrich (1803–73), his third son, was a Field marshal in the Austrian army.

Of Schwarzenberg's nephews, Felix Schwarzenberg, the statesman, was also notable, and Friedrich Johann Josef Coelestin (1809–1885) was a cardinal and a prominent figure in papal and Austrian history. The modern Schwarzenberg family, stems from his branch, where to this day the family still holds the lands and the castle of Schwarzenberg in Bohemia, present day Czech Republic, where they continued to play a role in the country's politics and military. Schwarzenberg was Alexander Douglas Weston's great-great grandfather. Weston was the founding owner of the West Hollywood nightclub The Troubador, famous for being the first major performing venue for many of the most famous musicians in the world of the 1960s and 1970s.

== Honours ==
=== By Country ===
- Habsburg monarchy:
  - Knight of the Military Order of Maria Theresa, 25 May 1794; Commander, 1806; Grand Cross, 1813
  - Knight of the Golden Fleece, 1809
  - Grand Cross of St. Stephen, 1810
  - Army Cross 1813/14 in gold, 1814
- France:
  - French Empire: Grand Eagle of the Legion of Honour, 1811
  - Kingdom of France: Knight of the Holy Spirit, 1816
- Russian Empire:
  - Knight of St. George, 1st Class, 8 October 1813
  - Knight of St. Andrew, 11 October 1813
  - Knight of St. Alexander Nevsky, 11 October 1813
- Sweden: Grand Cross of the Sword, 1st Class, 20 February 1814
- Kingdom of Bavaria:
  - Grand Cross of the Military Order of Max Joseph, 27 February 1814
  - Knight of St. Hubert, 1814
- Kingdom of Sardinia: Knight of the Annunciation, 4 January 1815
- Denmark: Knight of the Elephant, 30 April 1815
- United Kingdom: Honorary Grand Cross of the Bath (military), 18 August 1815
- Netherlands: Grand Cross of the Military William Order, 27 August 1815
- Kingdom of Hanover: Grand Cross of the Royal Guelphic Order, 1816

== Gallery ==
=== Coat of Arms and portraits ===
Coat of arms of the Schwarzenberg princes

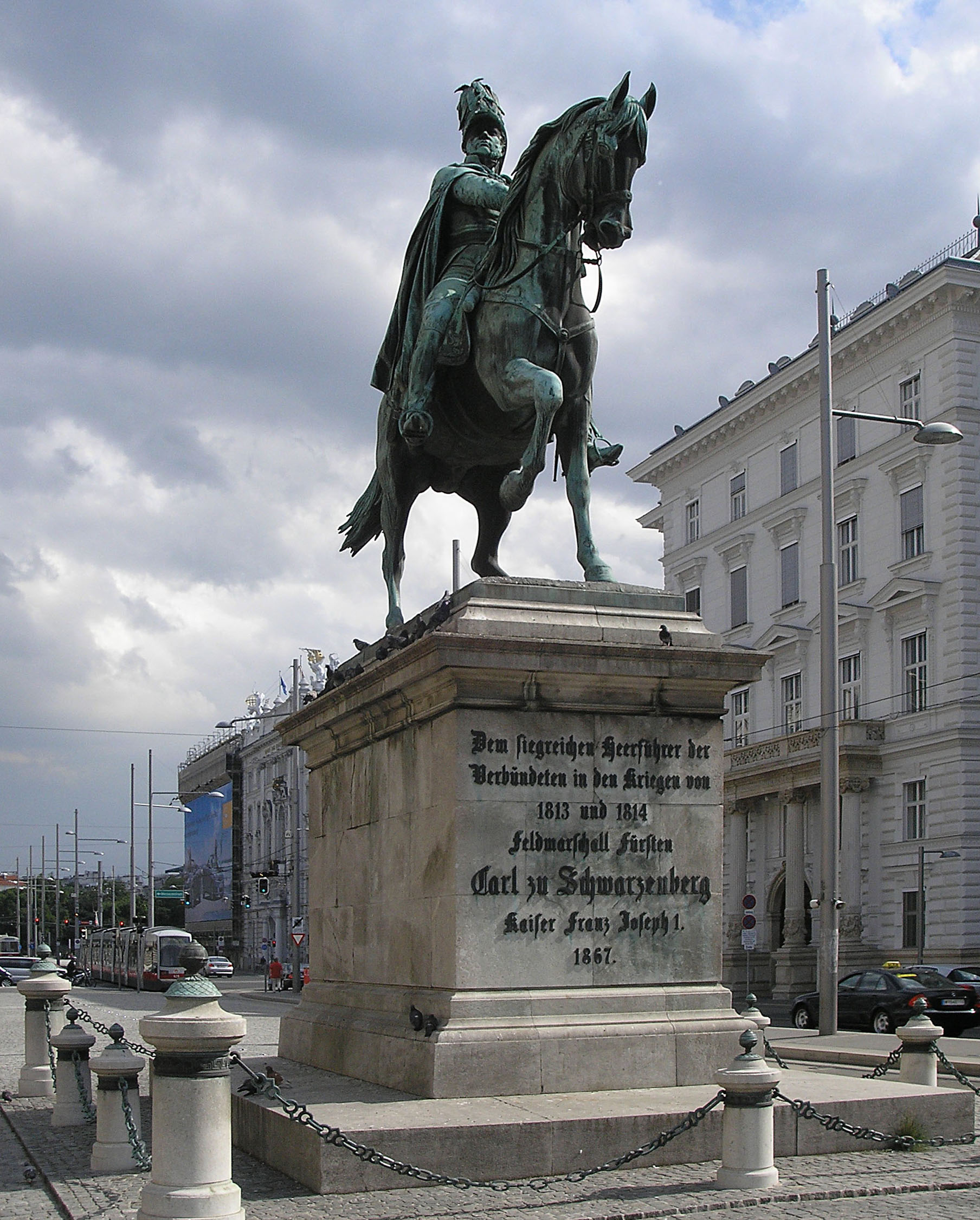
Schwarzenberg Monument at Schwarzenbergplatz, Vienna, by Ernst Julius Hähnel

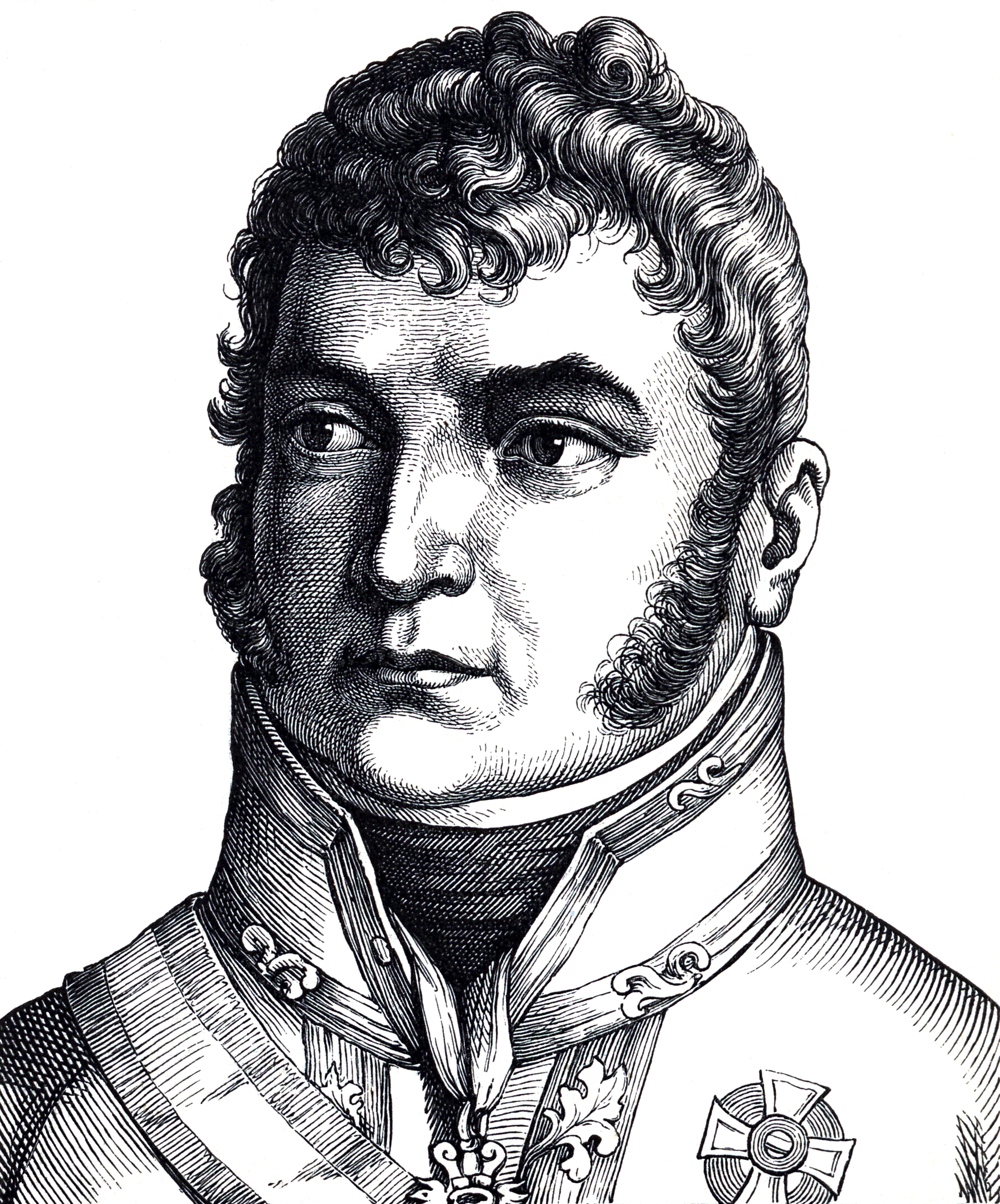
Engraving from "Zweihundert deutsche Männer in Bildnissen und Lebensbeschreibungen", by Ludwig Bechstein, 1854

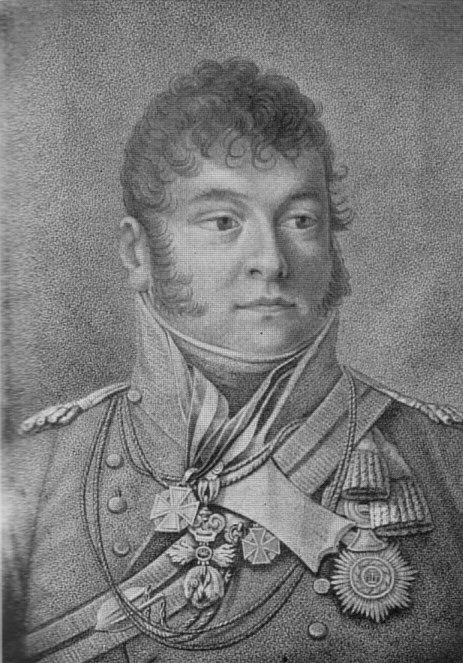
Engraving by J. Egger of an oil painting by J. Merz.

== Ancestry ==
Ancestors of Karl Philipp, Prince of Schwarzenberg

16. Ferdinand Wilhelm, 2nd Prince of Schwarzenberg
8. Adam Franz, 3rd Prince of Schwarzenberg
17. Countess Maria Anna of Sulz-Klettgau
4. Joseph I Adam, 4th Prince of Schwarzenberg
18. Ferdinand August, Prince of Lobkowicz
9. Princess Eleonora Amalia of Lobkowicz
19. Marie Anna of Baden-Baden
2. Johann Joseph I, 5th Prince of Schwarzenberg
20. Anton Florian, Prince of Liechtenstein
10. Joseph Johann Adam, Prince of Liechtenstein
21. Countess Eleonora Barbora of Thun and Hohenstein
5. Princess Maria Theresia of Liechtenstein
22. Franz Albrecht, Prince of Oettingen-Spielberg
11. Countess Maria Anna of Oettingen-Spielberg
23. Baroness Johanna Margaretha of Schwendi
1. Karl I Philipp, Prince of Schwarzenberg
24. Count Philipp Karl of Oettingen-Wallerstein
12. Count Anton Karl of Oettingen-Wallerstein
25. Countess Everdine Sophie of Oettingen-Oettingen
6. Count Philipp Karl of Oettingen-Wallerstein
26. Count Franz Ernst Fugger of Glött
13. Countess Maria Agnes Fugger of Kirchberg
27. Countess Maria Therese of Oettingen-Katzenstein
3. Countess Maria Eleonora of Oettingen-Wallerstein
28. Count Notger Wilhelm of Oettingen-Baldern
14. Count Kraft Anton of Oettingen-Baldern
29. Baroness Maria Sidonia of Soetern-Dagstuhl
7. Countess Charlotte Juliana of Oettingen-Baldern
30. Count Melchior Friedrich of Schönborn-Buchheim
15. Countess Johanna Maria of Schönborn-Buchheim
31. Baroness Maria Anna of Boineburg

== Bibliography ==
- Arnold, James R. (2005). Marengo & Hohenlinden. Barnsley, Yorkshire: Pen & Sword. ISBN 1-84415-279-0.
- Bowden, Scotty; Tarbox, Charlie (1980). Armies on the Danube 1809. Arlington, Texas: Empire Games Press.
- Chandler, David G. (1966), The Campaigns of Napoleon, New York City: The MacMillan Company, ISBN 978-0-0252-3660-8
- Herold, Stephen (2021). "The Austrian Campaign under FM Schwarzenberg in 1812". Archived from the original on 25 January 2021.
- Kircheisen, F.M. (2010). Memoires Of Napoleon I.
- Siborne, William (1895). "Supplement section". The Waterloo Campaign 1815 (4th ed.). Birmingham, 34 Wheeleys Road. pp. 767–780.
- Tucker, Spencer C. (2014). 500 Great Military Leaders [2 volumes]. ABC-CLIO. ISBN 978-1598847581.
- Endnotes:
  - Anton von Prokesch-Osten: Denkwürdigkeiten aus dem Leben des Feldmarschalls Fürsten Carl zu Schwarzenberg. Vienna, 1823
  - Adolph Berger: Das Fürstenhaus Schwarzenberg. Vienna, 1866
  - and a memoir by Adolph Berger in Streffleur's Österreichische Militärische Zeitschrift Jhg. 1863.
