= Joseph II, Prince of Schwarzenberg =

Joseph II
- Prince of Schwarzenberg
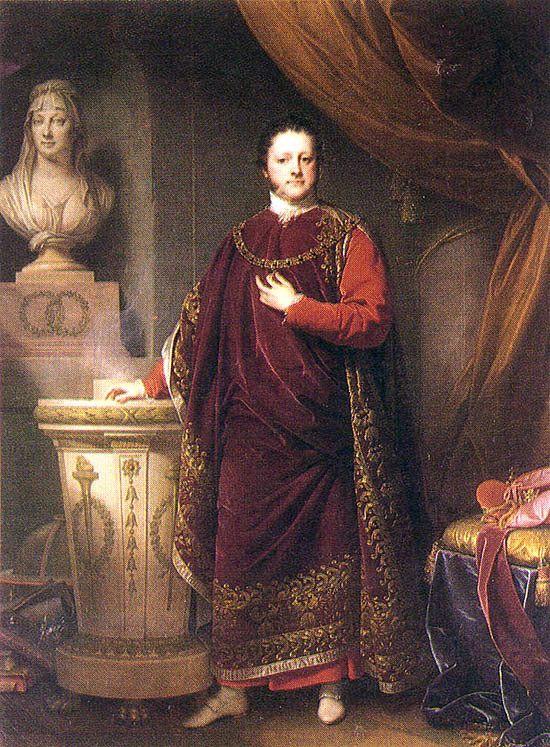
- Born: 27 June 1769; Vienna, Archduchy of Austria
- Died: 19 December 1833 (aged 64); Frauenberg, Kingdom of Bohemia, Austrian Empire
- Noble family: House of Schwarzenberg
- Spouse: Princess Pauline Karolina Iris von Arenberg-Aarschot
- Issue: Prince Felix of Schwarzenberg
- Father: Johann I, Prince of Schwarzenberg
- Mother: Countess Maria Eleonora von Oettingen-Wallerstein

Joseph II Johann 6th Prince of Schwarzenberg (Vienna, 27 June 1769 - Frauenberg, 19 December 1833) was a German-Bohemian nobleman from the Schwarzenberg family. He also briefly served as a patron for Joseph Haydn and Ludwig van Beethoven.

== Biography ==
Joseph was born as the first son of Johann I, Prince of Schwarzenberg and Countess Maria Eleonora von Oettingen-Wallerstein and succeeded his father in 1789. He was active in the banking sector.

In 1798 he bought the Stubenbach and Gutwasser estates with the attached domains of Stachau, Altstadln and Neustadln. In 1801 or 1803 he acquired Willmendingen Castle in Klettgau, and in 1810 the Libějovice property.

In 1802 he ceded to his younger brother Karl Philipp, who later became Field Marshal, the second majorate of the Princely House and part of the family property, including Orlík Castle.

In 1806, after the occupation by the French, he lost sovereignty over the Franconian and Swabian possessions of his House. In 1808 Joseph was accepted into the Order of the Golden Fleece. His wife Pauline died in 1810 in a fire during a ball in the garden of the Austrian embassy in Paris in honor of Napoleon's marriage to Marie-Louise of Austria.

=== Marriage and offspring ===
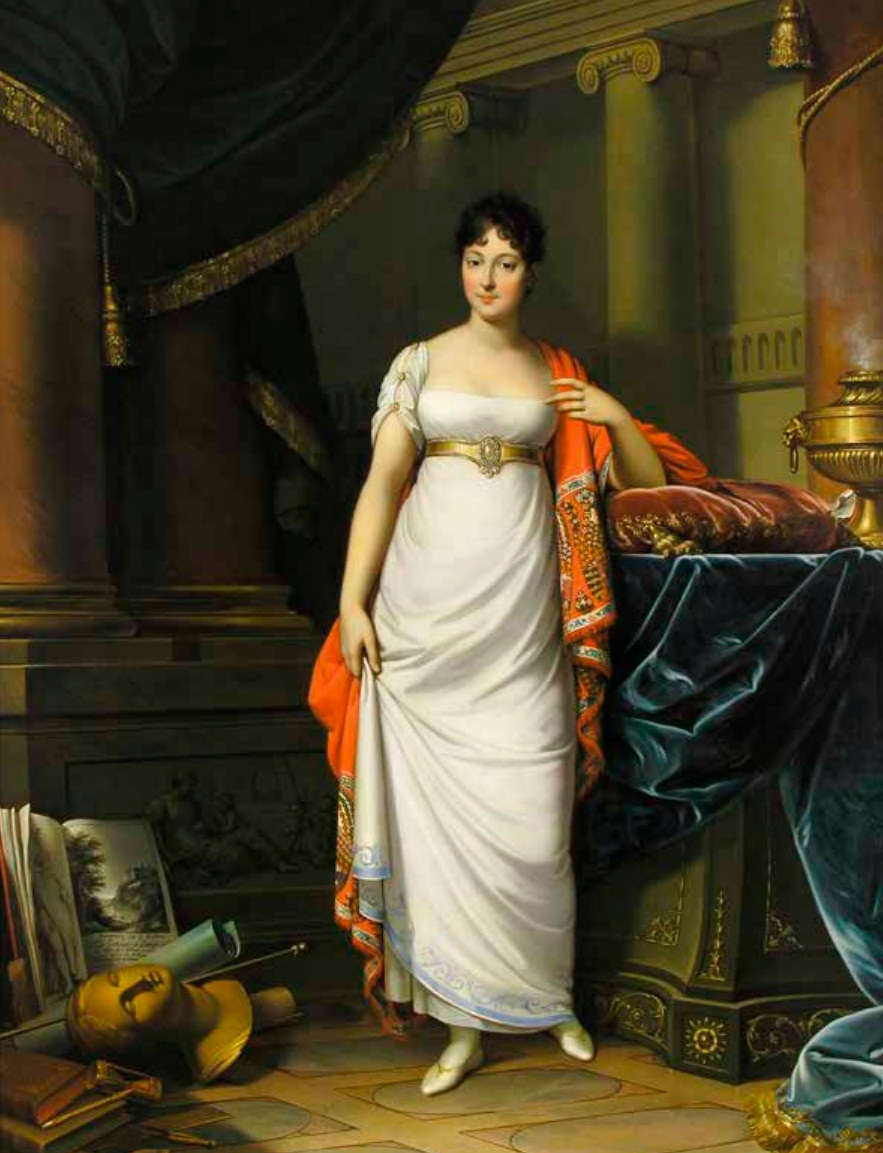
His wife, Princess Pauline Karolina Iris von Arenberg-Aarschot

Joseph married in May 1794 Princess Pauline Karolina Iris von Arenberg-Aarschot (2 September 1774 - 2 July 1810), daughter of Louis Engelbert, 6th Duke of Arenberg, and had six daughters and three sons:

- Marie Eleonore (1795–1848), married 1817 Alfred I, Prince of Windisch-Grätz (1787–1862);
- Marie Pauline (1798–1821), married 1817 Heinrich Eduard 2nd Prince of Schönburg-Hartenstein (1787–1872);
- Johann Adolph II (1799–1888), married 1830 Eleonore Princess of Liechtenstein (1812–1873), 7th Prince of Schwarzenberg;
- Felix Ludwig (1800–1852), Prime Minister of Austria;
- Aloysia Eleonore (1803–1884), married Heinrich Eduard Prince of Schönburg-Waldenburg-Hartenstein, the widower of her sister Marie Pauline;
- Mathilde Therese (1804–1886);
- Maria Karolina (1806–1875), married 1831 Ferdinand, 2nd Prince of Bretzenheim (1801–1855);
- Anna Bertha (1807–1883), married Prince August Longin Lobkowitz (1797–1842);
- Friedrich Johann (1809–1885), 1835 Archbishop of Salzburg, Cardinal and Prince Archbishop of Prague.

== Ancestry ==
Ancestors of Joseph II, Prince of Schwarzenberg

16. Ferdinand Wilhelm, 2nd Prince of Schwarzenberg
8. Adam Franz, 3rd Prince of Schwarzenberg
17. Countess Maria Anna of Sulz-Klettgau
4. Joseph I Adam, 4th Prince of Schwarzenberg
18. Ferdinand August, Prince of Lobkowicz
9. Princess Eleonora Amalia of Lobkowicz
19. Marie Anna of Baden-Baden
2. Johann Joseph I, 5th Prince of Schwarzenberg
20. Anton Florian, Prince of Liechtenstein
10. Joseph Johann Adam, Prince of Liechtenstein
21. Countess Eleonora Barbora of Thun and Hohenstein
5. Princess Maria Theresia of Liechtenstein
22. Franz Albrecht, Prince of Oettingen-Spielberg
11. Countess Maria Anna of Oettingen-Spielberg
23. Baroness Johanna Margaretha of Schwendi
1. Joseph II, 6th Prince of Schwarzenberg
24. Count Philipp Karl of Oettingen-Wallerstein
12. Count Anton Karl of Oettingen-Wallerstein
25. Countess Everdine Sophie of Oettingen-Oettingen
6. Count Philipp Karl of Oettingen-Wallerstein
26. Count Franz Ernst Fugger of Glött
13. Countess Maria Agnes Fugger of Kirchberg
27. Countess Maria Therese of Oettingen-Katzenstein
3. Countess Maria Eleonora of Oettingen-Wallerstein
28. Count Notger Wilhelm of Oettingen-Baldern
14. Count Kraft Anton of Oettingen-Baldern
29. Baroness Maria Sidonia of Soetern-Dagstuhl
7. Countess Charlotte Juliana of Oettingen-Baldern
30. Count Melchior Friedrich of Schönborn-Buchheim
15. Countess Johanna Maria of Schönborn-Buchheim
31. Baroness Maria Anna of Boineburg

== Sources ==
- BLKÖ:Schwarzenberg, Joseph Johann Nepomuk Fürst
