= Battle of Dresden =

1813 battle during the War of the Sixth Coalition

- Part of the German campaign of the War of the Sixth Coalition
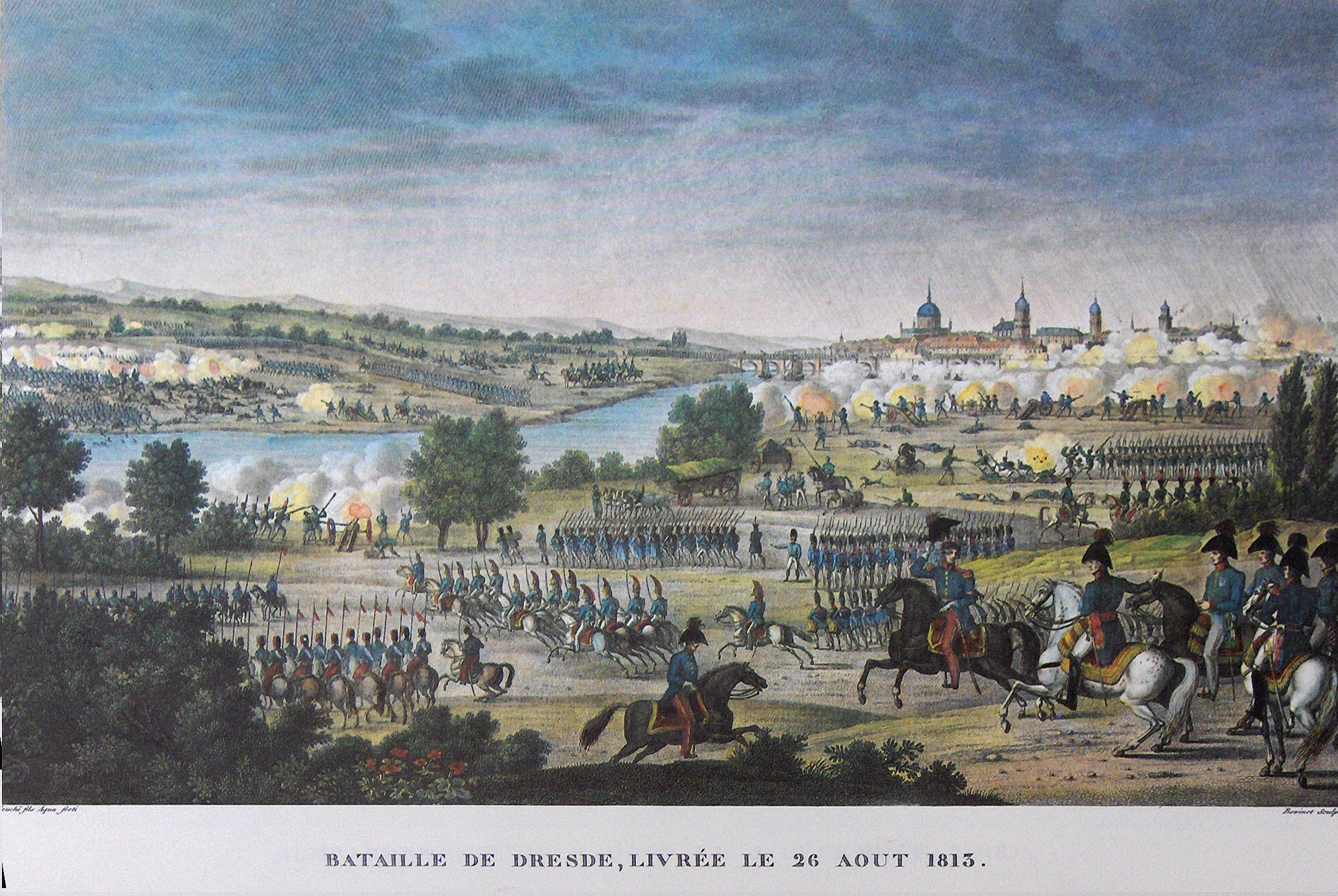
- Battle of Dresden by Carle Vernet and Jacques François Swebach
Date	26–27 August 1813
Location	Dresden, Kingdom of Saxony 51°02′N 13°44′E
Result	French victory

Belligerents
France (Kingdom of Saxony) Saxony	Austria; Russia; Prussia

Commanders and leaders
(First French Empire) Napoleon I Detailed list: (First French Empire) Michel Ney; (First French Empire) Auguste de Marmont; (First French Empire) Joachim Murat; (First French Empire) Claude Victor; (First French Empire) Laurent de Gouvion Saint-Cyr; (First French Empire) Édouard Mortier; (First French Empire) Étienne de Pommeroux de Bordesoulle; ... and others (see French Order of Battle)	(Austrian Empire) Karl von Schwarzenberg Detailed list: (Austrian Empire) Francis I; (Austrian Empire) Ignác Gyulay; (Austrian Empire) Johann von Klenau; (Austrian Empire) Hesse-Homburg; (Austrian Empire) Hieronymus von Colloredo-Mansfeld; (Russian Empire) Alexander I; (Russian Empire) Peter Wittgenstein; (Russian Empire) Barclay de Tolly; (Russian Empire) Grand Duke Konstantin; (Russian Empire) Nikolay Raevsky; (Russian Empire) Dmitry Golitsyn; (Russian Empire) Jean Moreau †; (Russian Empire) Antoine-Henri Jomini; (Russian Empire) Ivan Dibich; (Kingdom of Prussia) Frederick William III; (Kingdom of Prussia) Friedrich Graf Kleist; (Kingdom of Prussia) Hans von Zieten; (Kingdom of Prussia) Georg von Pirch; ... and others (see Coalition Order of Battle)

Strength
100,000–135,000	200,000–215,000

Casualties and losses
10,000 killed or wounded (Note: British Major General John Mitchell in his historical work on Napoleon reports as many as 12,000 casualties. More modern authorities report 10,000.)	38,000–40,000; • 15,000 killed or wounded; • 25,000 captured or missing (Note: John Mitchell reports 25,000 but total casualties; however, he includes only the killed, wounded, and missing, without prisoners. More modern authorities report much greater losses in both personnel and cannon.); 40 guns; 15 colours
- Location within Europe

War of the Sixth Coalition:
German campaign
current battle
Napoleon in command
Napoleon not in command

The Battle of Dresden (26–27 August 1813) was a major engagement of the Napoleonic Wars. The battle took place around the city of Dresden in modern-day Germany, then the capital of the Kingdom of Saxony. With the recent addition of Austria, the Sixth Coalition felt emboldened in their quest to expel the French from Central Europe. Despite being heavily outnumbered, French forces under Napoleon scored a victory against the Army of Bohemia led by Generalissimo Karl von Schwarzenberg. However, Napoleon's victory did not lead to the collapse of the coalition, and the weather and the uncommitted Russian reserves who formed an effective rearguard precluded a major pursuit. Three days after the battle, the Coalition surrounded and destroyed a French corps advancing into their line of withdrawal at the Battle of Kulm.

Dresden lies on the banks of the Elbe. Strategically, the Dresden Augustus Bridge (the only permanent bridge in the city at that time) was a choke point for Schwarzenberg's coalition forces advancing from the south, plus French artillery parks and supplies were stockpiled in the city. In anticipation of the battle, Napoleon ordered the strengthening of Dresden's defenses, whose southern walls were in a degenerated state. Marshal Saint-Cyr erected hasty fortifications south of the city. By attacking, his corps temporarily held off Schwarzenberg's advanced Russo-Prussian units under General Peter Wittgenstein. Having bought the necessary time, Saint-Cyr was soon reinforced by Napoleon himself, whose three corps had made a rapid forced march to his aid. Napoleon thus abandoned the pursuit of Blücher's Army of Silesia, for which observation forces were left in the form of Macdonald's Army of the Bober. Schwarzenberg was a "competent soldier who was prone to moments of hesitation and tended to be overcautious"; he was further burdened with three monarchs (Note: Alexander I of Russia, Francis I of Austria, Frederick William III of Prussia) whose opinions had to be taken into account. It was the hesitation that cost Schwarzenberg the opportunity to act in accordance with the Trachenberg Plan and defeat the French in detail. The battle occurred between the areas southwest and southeast of the city limits. The Coalition belatedly launched a massive assault on the city's outskirts, but after some successes, they were outmatched by surprise and efficient counterattacks under Napoleon himself. Thus Schwarzenberg was decisively defeated on all sectors of the battle. Marshal Murat's cavalry particularly distinguished itself by breaking through the left allied flank, which was isolated by the flooded river from the rest of the army—a vulnerability that Napoleon took advantage of.

Historian Modest Bogdanovich summarized the battle and noted the following details. 'Both the city itself and its surroundings presented a picture of anxiety and devastation... Napoleon, in turn, was justifiably proud of his success. The allies had almost double the cavalry, and they also had the advantage in artillery. Napoleon's troops consisted almost exclusively of fresh conscripts, while the allies had many veterans. But these advantages could not compensate for the lack of unity of command, prompt mutual understanding, and fast execution. Many of the individual commanders, for example, Zieten and Colloredo, covered themselves with glory, and the troops fought very bravely, but at their head was Schwarzenberg, while at the head of the French was Napoleon. Neither even the experience of Moreau nor the profound knowledge of Jomini, the French apostates who participated on the Imperial-Russian side, could compensate for the shortcomings.' Historian David G. Chandler stated that owing to the Battle of Dresden, "the legend of French invincibility had been fully re-established."

== Prelude ==
On 16 August, Napoleon had sent Marshal Saint-Cyr's corps to fortify and hold Dresden in order to hinder coalition movements and to serve as a possible base for his own manoeuvres. He planned to strike against the interior lines of his enemies and defeat them in detail, before they could combine their full strength. He had a field army of 442,810 men and 1,284 guns in 559 battalions and 395 squadrons against Coalition field forces totaling 512,113 men in 556 battalions, 572 squadrons and 68 Cossack regiments, and 1,380 guns.

The Coalition avoided battle with Napoleon himself, choosing to attack his subordinate commanders as per the Trachenberg Plan. On 23 August, at the Battle of Grossbeeren, south of Berlin, Crown Prince Charles of Sweden (formerly French Marshal Bernadotte, Napoleon's own Marshal) defeated his old comrade Marshal Oudinot. On 26 August, Prussian Marshal Blücher crushed Marshal MacDonald's army at the Battle of Katzbach.

== Battle ==
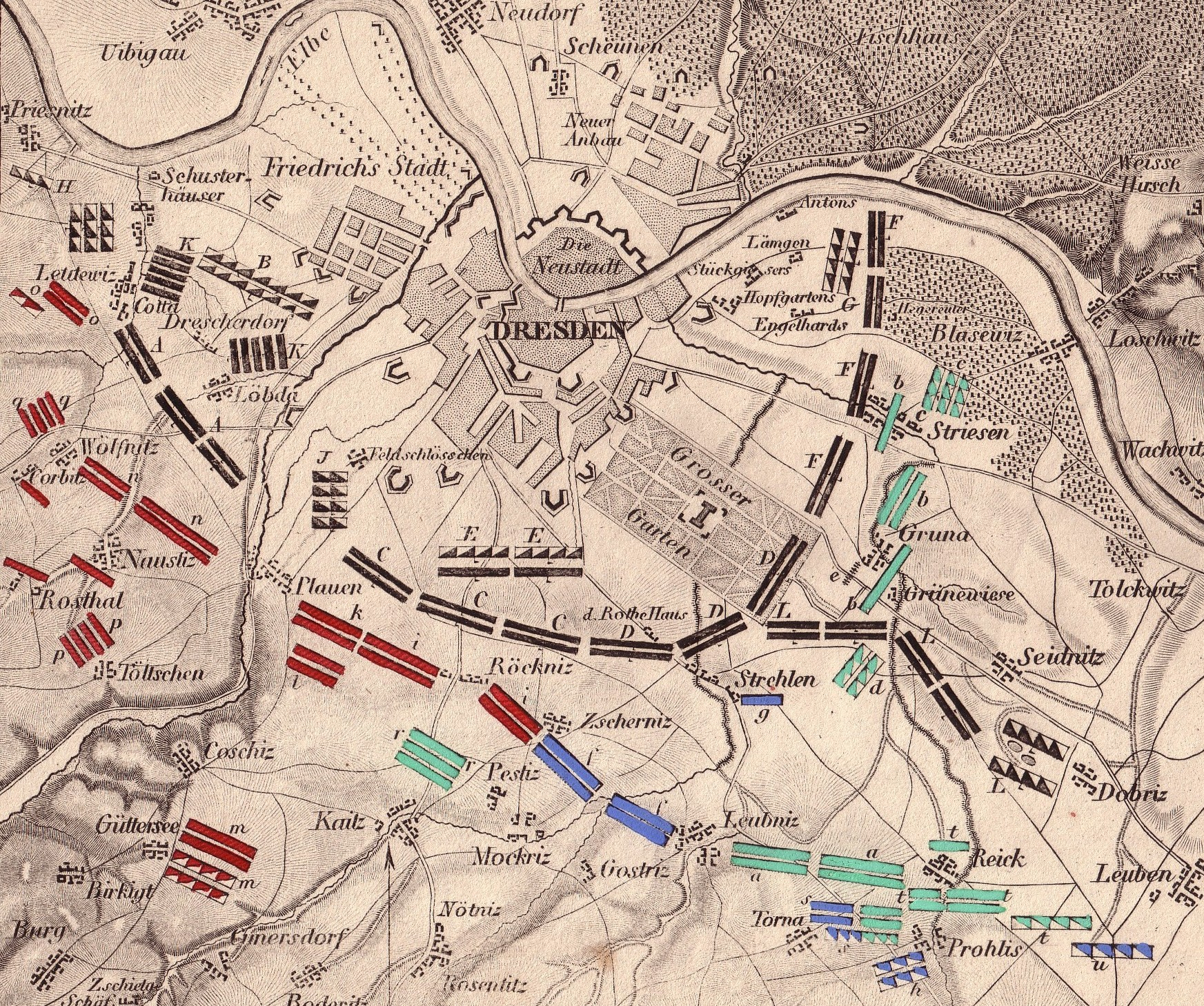
Situation on 27 August. The blacks are French, the greens are Russians, the blues are Prussians and the reds are Austrians.

On 25 August, the three monarchs—Alexander I of Russia, Francis I of Austria, and Frederick William III of Prussia—and their staffs assembled on an overlook of the city to discuss their strategy. The city's weak defenses were clear from this vantage point: the French and Saxon garrison of 20,000 men under Marshal Saint-Cyr could not hope to hold a city of that size. The monarchs were a thorn in Schwarzenberg's side, interfering at inopportune moments and causing confusion when important decisions had to be made. "It is really inhuman," Schwarzenberg complained, "what I must tolerate and bear, surrounded as I am by fools, eccentrics, projectors, intriguers, asses, babblers, and niggling critics." The Tsar and General Jean Victor Moreau, formerly a General of France and by 1813 an adviser to the Coalition, wanted to attack at once; Karl Philipp Fürst zu Schwarzenberg wanted to wait until additional forces arrived.

=== 26 August ===
The following day, 26 August, Schwarzenberg sent the Coalition force of over 200,000 men to attack Saint-Cyr. The Army of Bohemia was divided into three parts: the Left Wing consisted of Austrians and commanded by Schwarzenberg himself and included the 9 divisions of infantry, 3 divisions of cavalry and 128 guns; the Right Wing consisted of Russians and Prussians under Wittgenstein and included 2 Russian infantry divisions and von Kleist's Prussian corps and 158 guns; the Reserves behind the center consisted of the best Russian and Prussian troops under Barclay de Tolly and included 2 Russian grenadier divisions, 4 Russian Guard cavalry divisions, the Prussian Royal Guard and about 150 guns. The monarchs stayed with the reserves.

In Dresden, Saint-Cyr's XIV Corps manned the various redoubts and defensive positions. From 6:00am to noon, the coalition probed the French defenses. Napoleon arrived from the north about 10:00am with the Guard Infantry and Murat's I Cavalry Corps arriving shortly afterwards, covering 140 kilometers (87 mi) in forced marches over three days. His charisma instilled all ranks, "from Saint-Cyr to the lowest private, with newfound confidence in their ultimate triumph." Napoleon's Guard consisted of 2 Young Guard Corps and the Old Guard Division.

Shortly after 11:00am, the Coalition monarchs noticed the stream of French troops hurrying into Dresden from the north. There was a lull in the battle between noon and 3:00pm while the French reinforcements took positions and the Coalition leaders pondered whether they should fight Napoleon or withdraw. The Coalition finally began a bombardment and general assault starting about 3:00 pm against the southern suburbs of the city. Wittgenstein's Russians, despite some local successes, suffered heavy losses, particularly from artillery, and were stopped by the French in defensive positions. Soon, together with the Prussians, the Russians launched new attacks and were able to oust the French from local urban fortified footholds, including Großer Garten, which the Prussians of Zieten's van and Pirch's brigade captured, but in the end they were stopped on the outskirts, forced to retreat and also suffered heavy losses. Despite the losses, the Austrians of Colloredo-Mansfeld's corps managed to dislodge the French from the lunette. Then the Austrians assaulted a garden wall and could not break through, but their artillery from the covering forces was able to suppress some French guns. When the Austrians knocked the French out of the lunette and the Prussians captured Großer Garten, Kleist tried to capture the barrier. His advance in columns was covered by an embankment from the Kaitzbach, but when his skirmishers were ten paces from the barrier, the French opened a "fierce" cannonade from the batteries at the entrance to the suburb. This, coupled with rifle fire, forced the Prussians to withdraw. Gyulay's Austrians also steadily advanced, pushing the French out of the townships, but were unable to break through to another suburb.

Napoleon once again demonstrated his tactical mastery,—as the Coalition forces made progress, Bonaparte swiftly dispatched reinforcements to the threatened areas – the I Cavalry Corps to the French right, Ney and the II Young Guard Corps to the center and Mortier and the I Young Guard Corps to the French left. At 5:30 pm, Napoleon launched his riposte. Napoleonic counteroffensive was organized in a classically coordinated and energetic manner, formidably combining infantry and cavalry actions and flanking maneuvers; gradually the French recaptured all their positions. By nightfall, the French thus had regained almost all of Saint-Cyr's original positions and, moreover, Wittgenstein was pushed back even further by 2.1 kilometres (1.3 mi). As night fell on 26 August, a torrential downpour started that lasted throughout the night. The streams became swollen with water and the ground turned to mud.

=== 27 August ===
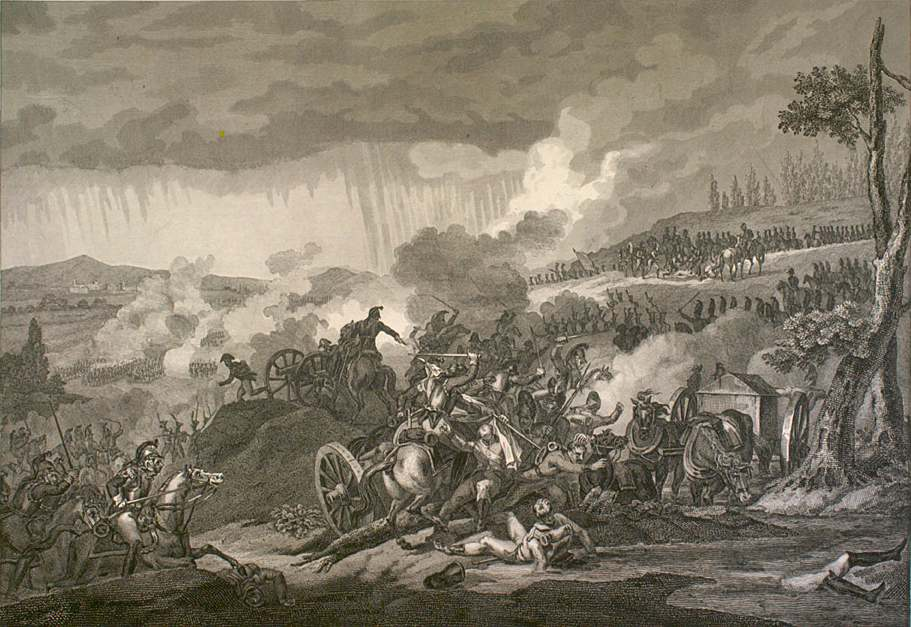
French cavalry attack in the Battle of Dresden on 27 Aug.

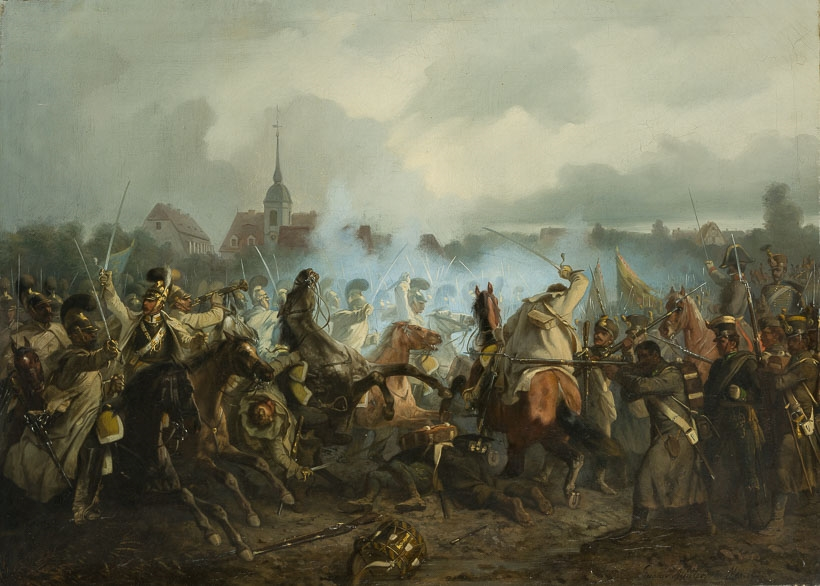
French cavalry attack in the battle

After being reinforced overnight with Victor's II Corps, Marmont's VI Corps and the Guard Cavalry, Napoleon attacked the following morning on 27 August in a steady rain, destroyed the coalition left flank, and won an impressive tactical victory. The flooded Weisseritz, impassable at the battle site, cut off a large portion the left wing of the Coalition army, commanded by Johann von Klenau and Ignaz Gyulai (or Gyulay), from the Coalition's main body in the center. Marshal Joachim Murat took advantage of this isolation and inflicted heavy losses on the Austrians. A French participant observed, "Murat... cut off from the Austrian army Klenau's corps, hurling himself upon it at the head of the carabineers and cuirassiers. ... Nearly all his [Klenau's] battalions were compelled to lay down their arms, and two other divisions of infantry shared their fate." Of Klenau's force, Lieutenant Field Marshal Joseph, Baron von Mesko de Felsö-Kubiny's division of five infantry regiments was surrounded and captured by Murat's cavalry, which amounted to approximately 13,000 men, and 15 colours. Mesko was wounded, and retired the following year. Gyulai's divisions also suffered serious losses when they were attacked by Murat's cavalry supported by Victor's II Corps during a rainstorm. With damp flints and powder, their muskets would not fire and many battalions became an easy prey to the French cuirassiers and dragoons.

As the coalition left wing was being disintegrated, the French decided to attack on the coalition right wing with Ney, Mortier and Saint-Cyr. Despite desperate charges by the Russian and Prussian cavalry, this flank was also driven back. From the French side, the Young Guard and the Nansouty's cavalrymen were thrown into offensive here. In a few words, Wittgenstein's Russian vanguard under the command of Roth and Röder's Prussian cavalry, pressed by the French, were in gradual massive retreat. The French center was held by Marmont's VI Corps but the center was largely limited to an artillery duel. Success on the left side of the coalition right flank initially favored the French when they drove the Prussians out of the village of Strehlen. The Prussians retreated to Leubnitz. It was ordered to replace them with Russian (fresh) units. The Prussian line infantry was driven back from Leubnitz, but counterattacked with guns and bayonets and retook the village. Then the French attacked again, but General Dibich's Russian infantry repelled them and the French retreated. Napoleon, while there, ordered Saint-Cyr to raise a horse artillery battery to a height near Strehlen and strengthen the cannonade. The French column was again stopped by Russian artillery and afterwards cut down by the Austrian light cavalry. Still, by about 5:00 pm, the entire coalition force had to slowly pull back even though Schwarzenberg's powerful reserves had not been committed. That night, the Coalition decided that they have had enough and quietly withdrew south. Napoleon did not realize that they had left until the following morning.

The infantry used flintlocks back then, which became practically useless when the priming powder got wet. Since the rain did not stop all day, this greatly contributed to the defeat of the Austrian infantry where it was isolated. During 27 August, the cuirassier division of General de Bordesoulle found itself in front of the Austrian division built in an infantry square. Bordesoulle invited the Austrians to surrender, but the Austrian general refused. Bordesoulle, going forward, pointed out to him that not one of the Austrians' muskets could be fired. To this, the Austrian general objected that his men would fight back with bayonets, and the French horses were stuck up to their hooves in the mud and would not be able to crush them.

– I will break up your square with artillery.
– But you have none; it has stuck in the mud.
– Well, if I show you the guns behind my leading regiment, will you surrender?
– I shall have no choice, for I shall have no means left of defense.

Then Bordesoulle brought up 6 guns to within thirty paces, their attendants stood with lighted matches ready to fire. Only then did the Austrian division lay down its arms.

An effective rear-guard and the weather allowed Schwarzenberg to withdraw and escape any attempt of encirclement or pursuit. The Coalition had lost some 38,000 or up to 40,000 men, 40 guns, and 15 colours. The total Austrian losses amounted up to 16,300 men plus 22 guns. French casualties totaled around 10,000. Some of Napoleon's officers noted he was "suffering from a violent colic, which had been brought on by the cold rain, to which he had been exposed during the whole 2nd day of the battle."

== Aftermath ==
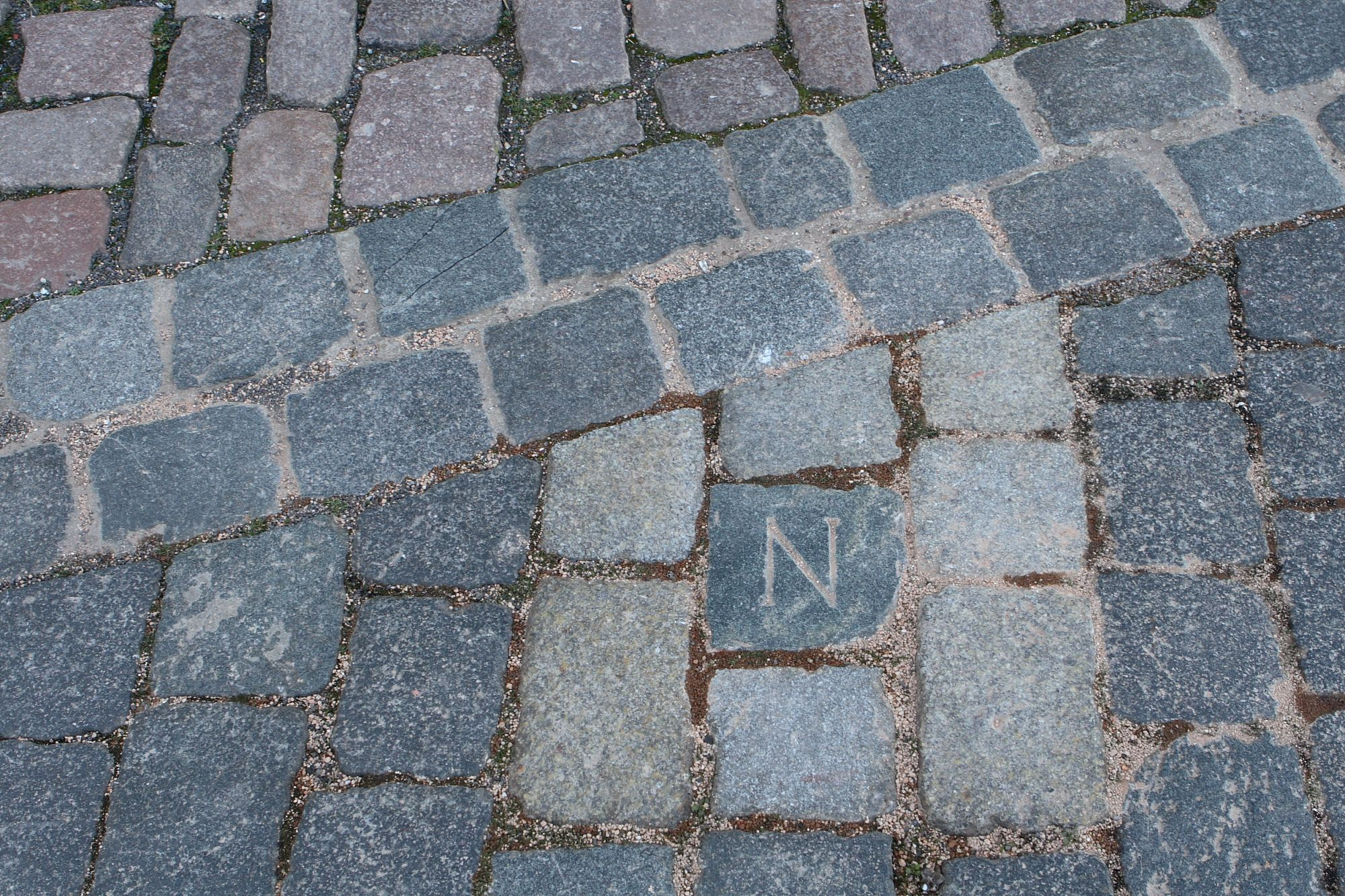
The Napoleon symbol "N" left in Dresden, Germany

On 27 August, General Vandamme received orders to advance on Pirna and bridge the Elbe there with his I Corps. This was accomplished in a pouring rain, without disturbing the Russians drawn up on the heights of Zehista. This advance by Vandamme ran into the midst of the coalition forces withdrawing from Dresden and resulted in the Battle of Kulm three days later. After being attacked from all sides, Vandamme was eventually compelled to surrender. This loss along with the defeats of Marshal Oudinot and Marshal MacDonald at the Battle of Katzbach overshadowed Napoleon's victory at Dresden.

Napoleon's old rival Jean Victor Marie Moreau, who had only recently returned from exile in the United States, was talking to the Tsar (who wished to see Napoleon defeated) and was mortally wounded in the battle, dying later on 2 September in Louny.

=== Hoffman ===
The author and composer E. T. A. Hoffmann happened to be in Dresden during the battle, being at the time employed by a locally based orchestra. On 22 August, after the end of the armistice, the Hoffmann Family was forced to relocate from their pleasant house in the suburbs into the town. During the next few days, as the battle raged, they experienced the ongoing bombardments. As Hoffman later recounted, many people were killed by shells directly in front of him. After the main battle was over, he visited the gory battlefield. His account can be found in Vision auf dem Schlachtfeld bei Dresden.

== Notes ==
Preceded by Battle of the Katzbach	Napoleonic Wars; Battle of Dresden	Succeeded by Battle of Kulm
