= Battle of Wolkowisk =

1812 battle during Napoleon's invasion of Russia

- Part of the French invasion of Russia
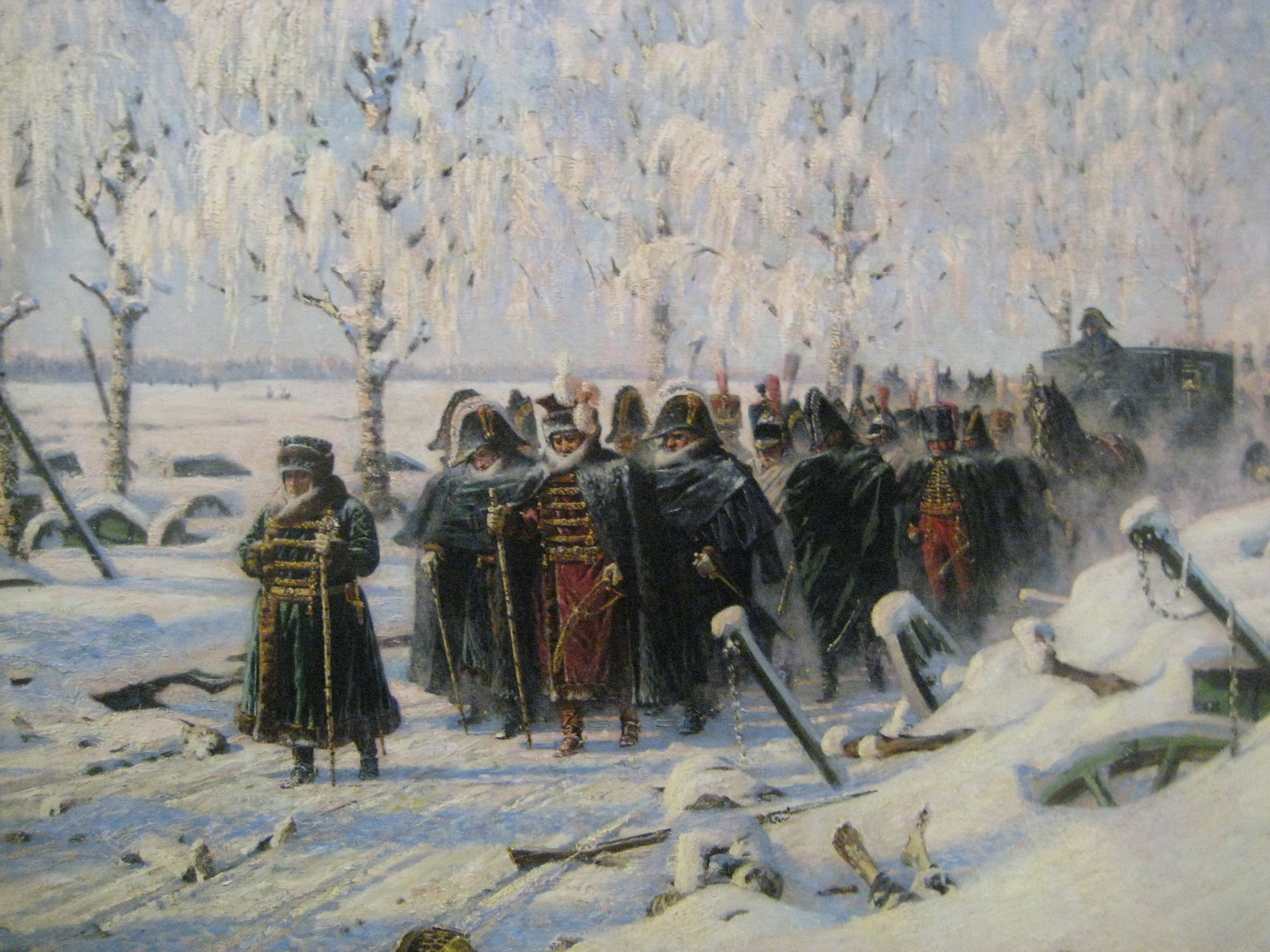
- Napoleon's retreat by Vasily Vereshchagin
Date	14–16 November 1812
Location	Volkovysk, Grodno Governorate, Russian Empire (today Vawkavysk, Belarus) 53°10′N 24°28′E
Result	Austrian victory

Belligerents
Russian Empire	Austrian Empire; Kingdom of Saxony (First French Empire) French Empire

Commanders and leaders
(Russian Empire) Osten-Sacken	(Austrian Empire) Schwarzenberg (First French Empire) Reynier

Strength
32,000: 27,000 plus 5,000 Cossacks; 152 cannon	35,000–40,500 (Note: 47,000 including unengaged troops.)

Casualties and losses
4,000 10,000 with retreat all the way to Brest	1,800

French invasion of Russia
current battle
Prussian corps
Napoleon
Austrian corps

The Battle of Wolkowisk (Volkovysk) took place 14–16 November 1812 in the course of the French invasion of Russia near the village of Wolkowisk or Volkovysk (now Vawkavysk), where 35,000–40,500 Austrian, Saxon and French soldiers under Karl Philipp, Prince of Schwarzenberg defeated 27,000–32,000 Russian soldiers under Fabian Gottlieb von der Osten-Sacken. Osten-Sacken managed to push back Jean Reynier's corps, but failed to dislodge it from the heights. The decisive offensive was carried out by the Austrians, who arrived later.

== Background ==
Prince Schwarzenberg was under the constraints of secret agreements between Vienna and St. Petersburg to give as little help as possible to Napoleon.

== Battle ==
Sacken had taken Wolkowisk on 14 November and driven off Jean Reynier's troops in a night attack but could not destroy this part of the French army, which took up positions on the heights north of Wolkowisk. Schwarzenberg on 15 November marched to Wolkowisk and left 6,500 men to protect Slonim. The Austrians attacked Sacken's troops on 16 November. Now the Russians were attacked on three sides but they were able to extricate themselves; thus Sacken finally withdrew toward Brest, which cost heavy casualties.

== Aftermath ==
Schwarzenberg followed Sacken but Maret ordered him to go to Minsk at once. Schwarzenberg obeyed reluctantly but later on he even did not continue his march to Minsk as the more than 300 km (190 mi) from Wolkowisk to Borisov and the Berezina led through poor country and increasingly deteriorating weather. He might have been able to block Chichagov but instead Schwarzenberg's 40,000 men did not support Napoleon at the Berezina.

== See also ==
- List of battles of the French invasion of Russia
