= Trachenberg Plan =

1813 Napoleonic Wars Coalition campaign plan

The Trachenberg Plan was a campaign strategy created by the Allies in the German Campaign of 1813 during the War of the Sixth Coalition, and named for the conference held at the palace of Trachenberg. The plan advocated avoiding direct engagement with French emperor, Napoleon I, which had resulted from fear of the emperor's now legendary prowess in battle. Consequently, the Allies planned to engage and defeat Napoleon's marshals and generals separately, and thus weaken his army while they built up an overwhelming force even he could not defeat. It was decided upon after a series of defeats and near disasters at the hands of Napoleon at Lützen, Bautzen and Dresden. The plan was successful, and at the Battle of Leipzig, where the Allies had a considerable numerical advantage, Napoleon was soundly defeated and driven out of Germany, back to the Rhine.

== Development ==
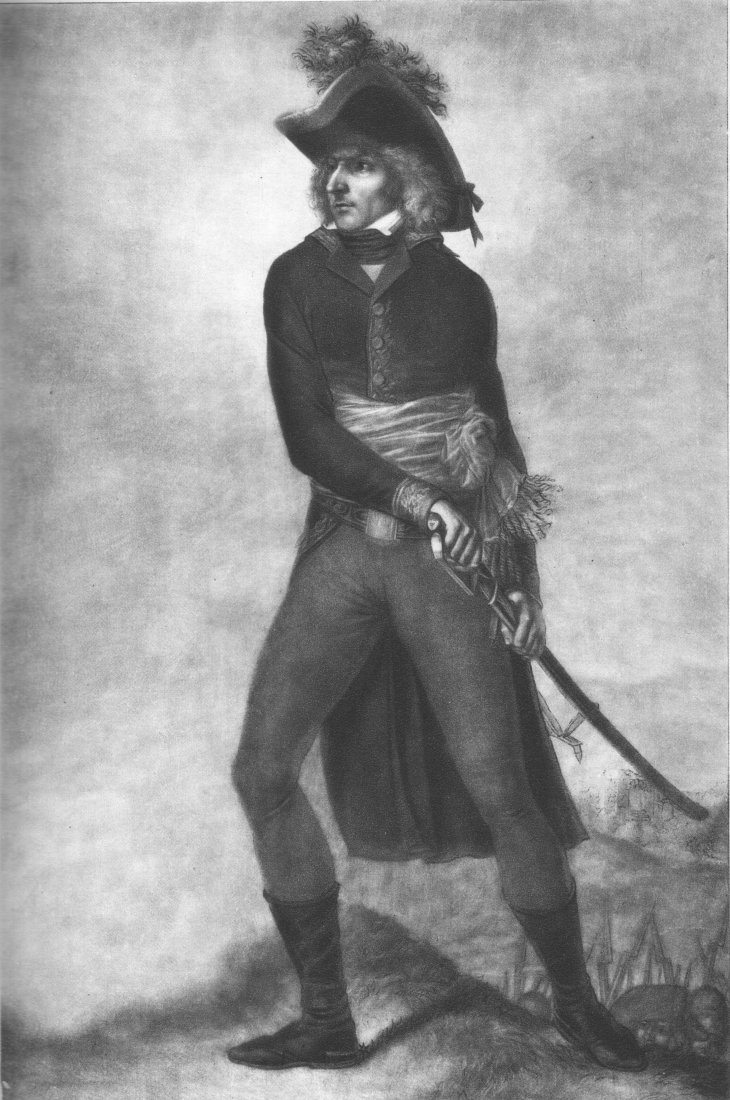
Former Marshal of the Empire Jean-Baptiste Bernadotte, later Crown Prince Charles John of Sweden, who played a key role in drafting the Trachenberg Plan.

The plan held elements of a number of other plans developed over the past two years by men such as Russian generals Karl Wilhelm von Toll, Barclay de Tolly and former French General, and Napoleon's erstwhile rival, Jean Victor Moreau, who was in correspondence with Charles John and en route to Sweden in summer 1813. However, the final plan was primarily an amalgam of two prior works that had been developed in parallel: the Trachenberg Protocol and the Reichenbach Plan, created by Crown Prince Charles John of Sweden (formerly Napoleon's Marshal Jean-Baptiste Bernadotte) whose experience with the tactics and methods of the Grande Armée, as well as personal insight on Napoleon's strategies, proved invaluable, and the Austrian chief of staff of the Sixth Coalition, Joseph Radetzky von Radetz.

Charles John had given a great deal of military advice to Tsar Alexander I of Russia during the 1812 Russian Campaign (after having turned down Alexander's offer of generalissimo of the Russian armies) on how to defeat the French invasion, and was able to see the successful practical outcomes of some of his theories and strategies that had been used by the Russians. Charles John refined his strategies over the next year, applied them to the probable theater of operations of Northern Germany, and presented them to Alexander and Frederick Wilhelm III of Prussia at the Trachenberg Conference, held on 9-12 July 1813 during the Truce of Pläswitz. The Allied sovereigns, after modifications to take into account the various policy considerations necessary to keep the disparate coalition partners happy, adopted Charles John's proposals as the basis of the general Coalition campaign plan. Meanwhile, Radetzky and the Austrians had been developing their own campaign plan in parallel, despite not officially joining the Sixth Coalition until 12 August 1813, based on the presumed theater of Saxony and Northeast Germany with a final decisive battle as its climax, the details of which folded well into the protocol agreed to at Trachenberg. The combined, modified version of the two prior campaign plans became known as the Trachenberg Plan.

== See also ==
- Attrition warfare against Napoleon
