= Louis-Léon de Brancas =

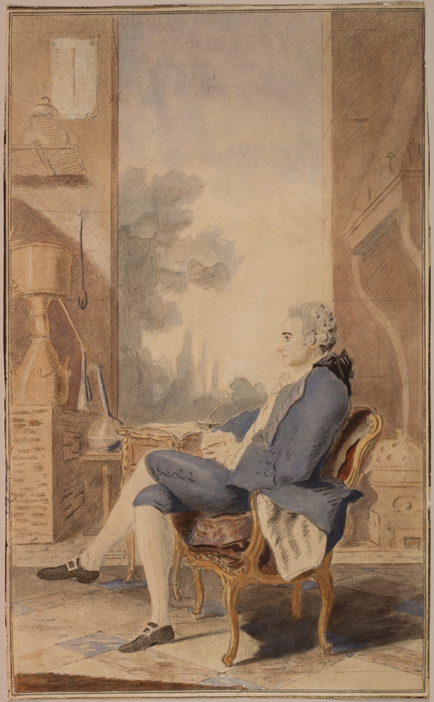
Louis-Léon-Félicité de Brancas, 3rd duc de Lauraguais seated in his study, with chemical apparatus.

Louis-Léon de Brancas (3 July 1733 – 9 October 1824), 3rd duc de Lauraguais, 6th duc de Villars, was a French general and author, and a member of the French Academy of Sciences.

He was the son of Louis de Brancas-Villars and Adelaide-Genevieve d'O, Marquise de Franconville. He married Elisabeth-Pauline de Gand, Princess d'Isenghien, in 1755.
