= Johann I of Schwarzenberg =

German-Bohemian noble

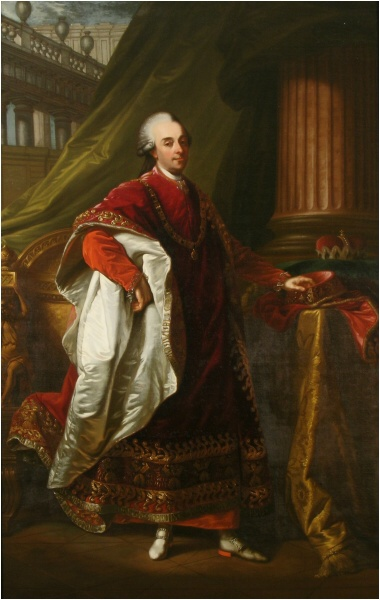
Painting of Jan Nepomuk Schwarzenberg in the Český Krumlov Castle.

Johann I, Prince of Schwarzenberg (Postelberg, 3 July 1742 – Frauenberg, Bohemia, 5 November 1789) was a German-Bohemian nobleman from the House of Schwarzenberg.

== Biography ==
Johann Nepomuk Anton was the firstborn son of Joseph I Adam, 5th Prince of Schwarzenberg and Maria Theresa of Liechtenstein (1721-1753), daughter of Joseph Johann Adam, Prince of Liechtenstein.

In 1782, he became 6th Prince of Schwarzenberg and Knight in the Order of the Golden Fleece. During his brief term as Prince from 1782 to 1789, he devoted himself to the administration and expansion of the Schwarzenberg fortune and, unlike his father and grandfather, led a very secluded life. He also did not hold their important positions at the Viennese imperial court. However, he was an Imperial and Royal Chamberlain and a Privy Councilor. He was also Coronation Ambassador to Rome at the coronation of Pope Clement XIII and Imperial Hereditary Court Judge at the Court of Rottweil.

His interest lay in the improvement of agriculture and forestry. He advocated for new, more effective methods of agricultural cultivation and had clover and alfalfa cultivated. He primarily pursued and supported forestry development in the Bohemian Forest. During his reign, construction of the Schwarzenberg Flood Canal, designed by Joseph Rosenauer, and the reconstruction of the Main Crane in Marktbreit after the severe flood of 1784, took place.
Johann I died just 47 years old, and is buried in Třeboň (Wittingau).

=== Marriage and children ===
Johann I Nepomuk von Schwarzenberg married on 14 July 1768 Countess Marie Eleonore zu Oettingen-Wallerstein (1747-1797) at Schönbrunn Palace, Vienna.
They had 13 children:

- Joseph II, 6th Prince of Schwarzenberg, Duke of Krumlov (1769-1833)
- Johann Nepomuk (1770-1779)
- Karl Philipp, Prince of Schwarzenberg (1771-1820), Austrian Supreme commander against Napoleon.
- Anton Johann (1772-1775)
- Franz de Paula (1773-1789)
- Ernst (1773-1821), Bishop of Győr in Hungary
- Friedrich Johann (1774-1795), killed in battle
- Marie Karoline (1775-1816), married Joseph Franz von Lobkowitz (1772-1816)
- Eleonore Karoline (1777-1782)
- Maria Elise (1778-1791)
- Maria Theresia (1780-1870), married Friedrich Egon Landgrave of Fürstenberg (1774-1856)
- Johann Nepomuk (1782-1783)
- Eleonore Sophie (1783-1846).
