= Miroslav Poche =

Czech politician and economist

Miroslav Poche MEP
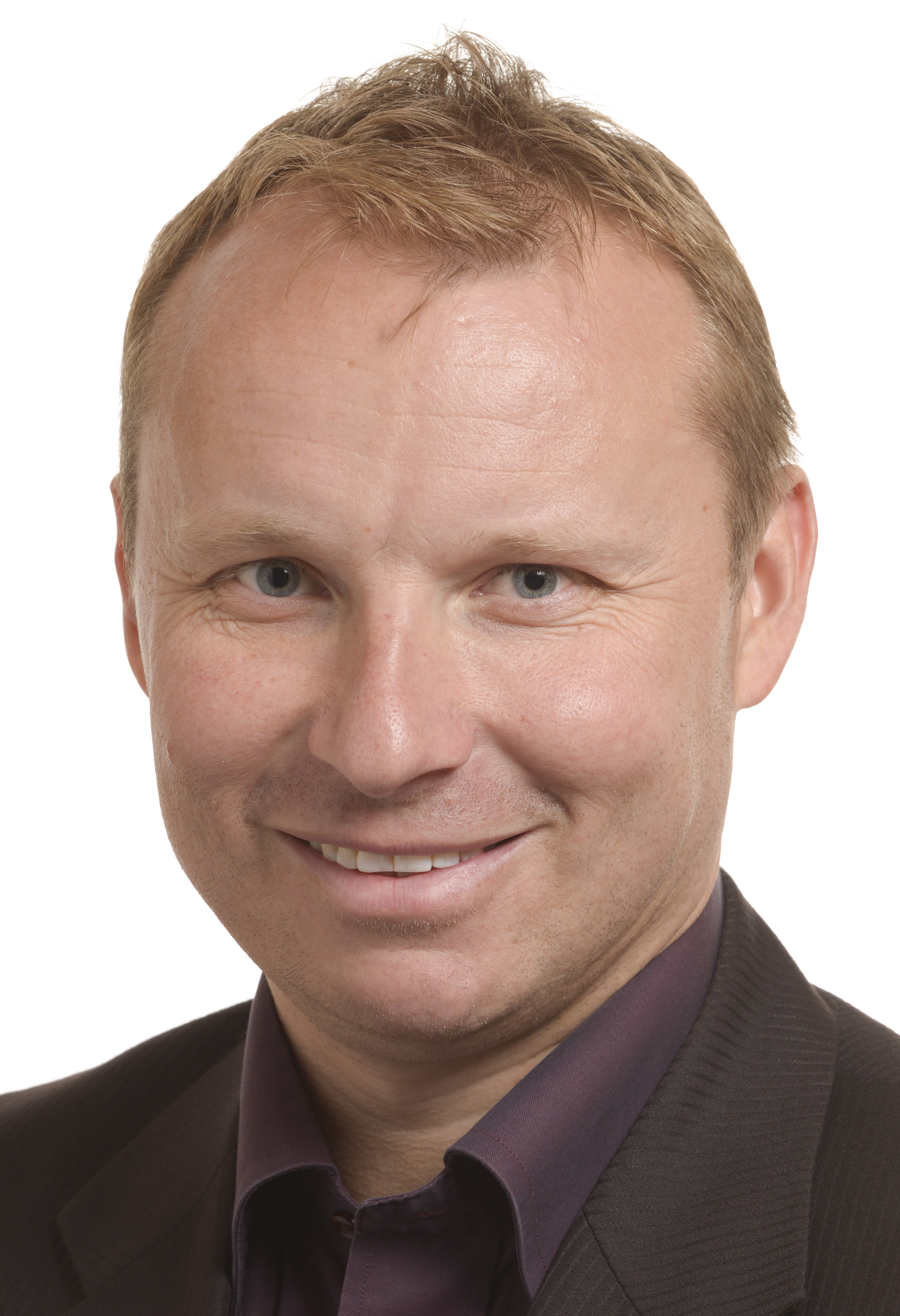

Member of the European Parliament for Czech Republic
- In office 1 July 2014 – 23 May 2019

Personal details
- Born: 3 June 1978 (age 48) Chlumec nad Cidlinou, Czechoslovakia
- Party: Social Democratic Party (1998–2025)
- Children: 2
- Education: Czech University of Life Sciences Prague; Charles University

Miroslav Poche (born 3 June 1978) is a Czech politician and economist. He has been a Member of the European Parliament for the Czech Republic from 2014 till 2019 and a member of the Social Democratic Party from 1998 till 2025.

== Early career ==
From 2009 until 2010, Poche served as adviser in the cabinet of Minister of Foreign Affairs Jan Kohout.

== Member of the European Parliament, 2014–2019 ==
Since joining the European Parliament, Poche has been serving on the Committee on Industry, Research and Energy. In addition to his committee assignments, he has been a member of the Parliament's delegations for relations with China and to the Euronest Parliamentary Assembly. He also represented the European Parliament in the OSCE/ODIHR international observation mission for the 2019 Moldovan parliamentary election.

== Later career ==
In Second Cabinet of Andrej Babiš, sworn in in June 2018, Miroslav Poche was originally nominated to be Minister of Foreign Affairs, but President Miloš Zeman's refused to swear him in and Jan Hamáček was made acting foreign minister.

On 26 June 2025, Poche announced on X (formerly Twitter) his departure from SOCDEM as he refused party cooperation with Stačilo!.
