= Karel VI Schwarzenberg =

Czech aristocrat (born 1911)

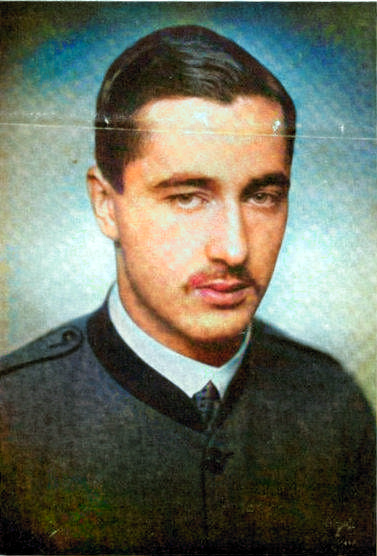

Personal details
- Born: 5 July 1911 Čimelice, Austria-Hungary
- Died: 9 April 1986 (aged 74) Vienna, Austria
- Spouse: Antonie Leontina Schwarzenberg
- Children: 4 including Karel VII Schwarzenberg
- Education: Charles University
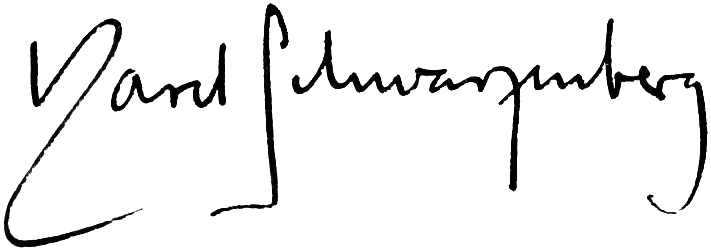
- Signature

Military service
- Years of service: 1931–1939 1945–1948
- Rank: Officer
- Battles/wars: Prague uprising, Battle of Čimelice, May Uprising of the Czech People

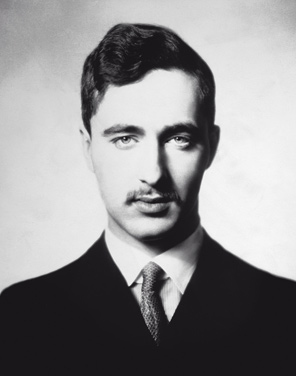
Karel VI Schwarzenberg

Karel VI Schwarzenberg, 6th prince of Schwarzenberg (5 July 1911 – 9 April 1986) was a Czech aristocrat, politician, writer and resistance fighter during World War II.

In the 1930s, the Catholic conservative and nationalist convictions of Schwarzenberg led him to play a leading role in the fascist movement Vlajka where he promoted monarchism mixed with fascism. The party failed to gain much support and by 1936 had about 5,000 members. Due to the Munich crisis, Karel completely renounced his earlier anti-Semitic and fascist beliefs and became a lifelong supporter committed of a Jewish state in Palestine. He also owned many properties in South Bohemia such Orlík Castle and Čimelice. He was popular among the poor people, but he had enemies in the ranks of the Czechoslovak government and also the German elites of Nazi Germany because of his pro-Czech and anti-Nazi policy.

His son Karel Schwarzenberg was influential politician in post-communist Czechoslovakia and the Czech Republic.

== Biography ==
=== Early life ===
Karel VI. Schwarzenberg was born as Karel Bedřich Maria Josef Jan Nepomucký Cyril Metoděj, Duke of Schwarzenberg on 5 July 1911 in the village of Čimelice, where the Czech branch of the Schwarzenberg family owned a small castle. When he was just three years old, his father died fighting on the Serbian front of World War I. As a member of high nobility, he was related to numerous historical personas, notably the Austrian general and patron of Beethoven Eduard Clam-Gallas, who was his great grandfather. Being the only son, he was the heir of the Czech branch of the House of Schwarzenberg, but due to his young age, only took charge of family property in 1933.

Schwarzenberg studied forestry at the Prague Polytechnic and later history and heraldry at the Charles University with professor Josef Pekař.

=== The Vlajka period ===
In the 1930s, the Catholic conservative and nationalist convictions of Schwarzenberg led him to play a leading role in the fascist movement Vlajka. Decades later completely renounced his earlier anti-Semitic beliefs and became a lifelong supporter committed of a Jewish state in Palestine.

=== World War II resistance ===
During World war II, Schwarzenberg was active in the Czech Resistance. In 1938 and 1939 he delivered manifestos signed by Czech noble houses to presidents Edvard Beneš and Emil Hácha declaring the staunch support of historical Czech noble houses for Czech independence in its historical borders. Furthermore he refused to claim the Third Reich citizenship, despite having German roots and being raised speaking German as well as Czech. Instead, he repeatedly declared his allegiance to the Czech nation. In 1942 the reichprotektor Reinhard Heydrich accused the Schwarzenbergs of hostile agitation and espionage and took the family property under state custody. In Čimelice, where Schwarzenberg moved after being evicted from the family main seat at the Orlík Castle, he actively participated in the resistance movement for which he was recognized after the war as an anti-fascist fighter and the family received its property back.

=== Exile and death ===
After the Communist 1948 Czechoslovak coup d'état coup in 1948, the family's property was again nationalized. Schwarzenberg left Czechoslovakia to exile in Vienna, where he worked as an archivist and studied historical connections between Czech and Russian nobility.

Karel Schwarzenberg died on 9 April 1986 in Vienna at the age of 75.

== Personal life ==
Schwarzenberg was married to Antonie Leontina Fürstenberg of the Swabian noble house of Fürstenberg. They had four children together - two sons and two daughters. The older son, Karel VII Schwarzenberg returned to Czechoslovakia, where he served as the chancellor of the president Václav Havel, later the minister of foreign affairs of Czechia and served several terms in the Czech Senate.
