= 2013 TOP 09 leadership election =

- 8 December 2013
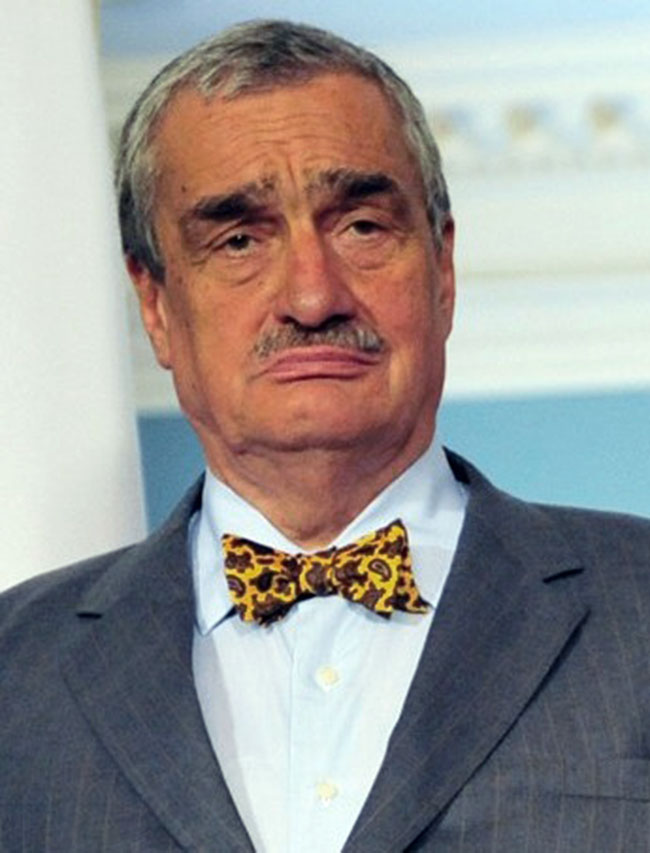
Nominee	Karel Schwarzenberg
Party	TOP 09
Electoral vote	160
Percentage	91.95%
Leader of TOP 09 before election
Karel Schwarzenberg
Elected Leader of TOP 09
Karel Schwarzenberg

A leadership election was held in the TOP 09 party in the Czech Republic on 8 December 2013. Incumbent Karel Schwarzenberg was unopposed yet again. He received 160 of the 174 votes.

== Results ==
Candidate	Votes	%
Karel Schwarzenberg	160	91.95
Against	14	8.05
Total	174	100
