= Jan Lipavský =

Czech IT manager and politician (born 1985)

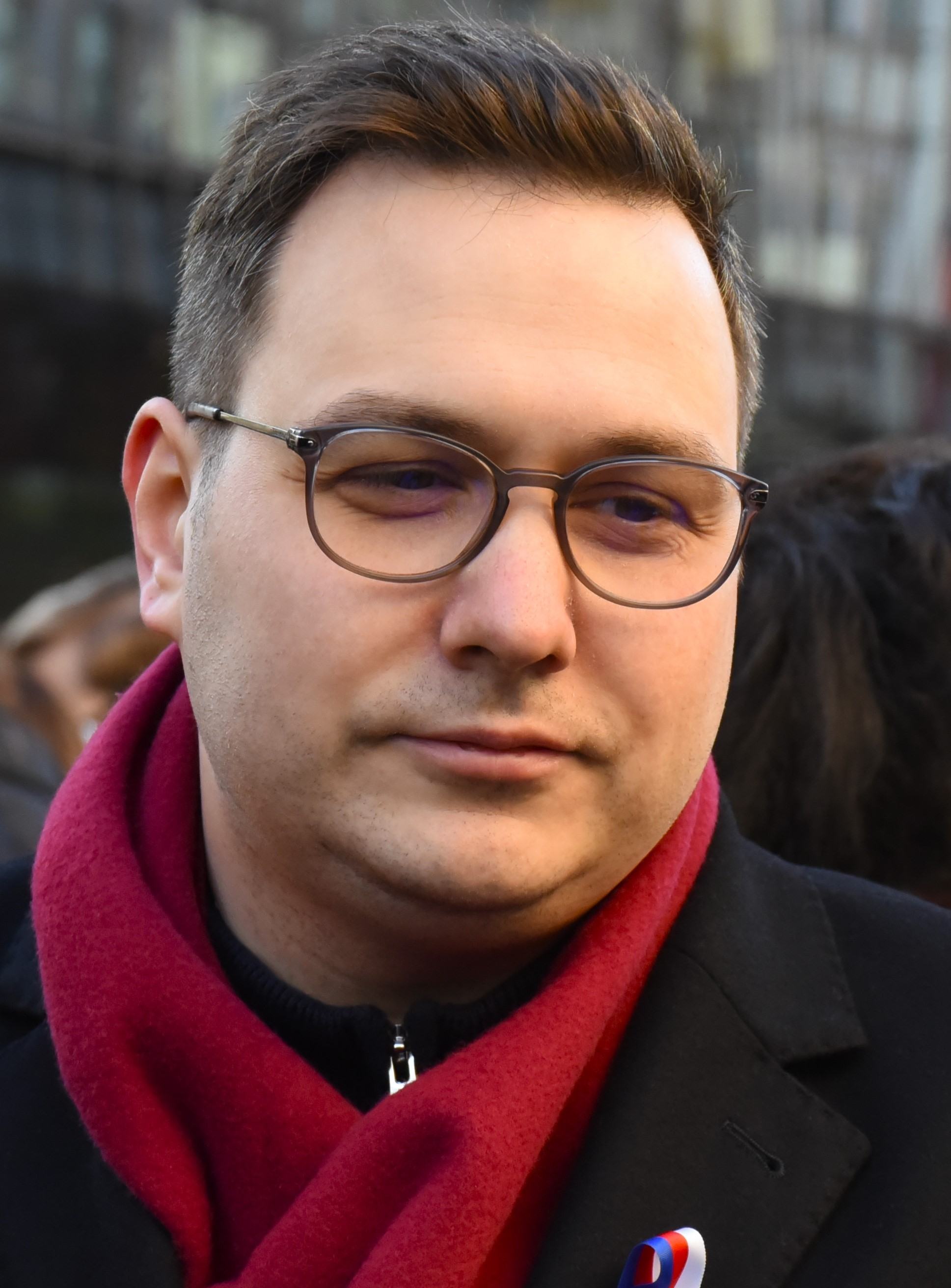
- Lipavský in 2023

Minister of Foreign Affairs
- In office 17 December 2021 – 15 December 2025
- Prime Minister: Petr Fiala
- Preceded by: Jakub Kulhánek
- Succeeded by: Petr Macinka

Member of the Chamber of Deputies
- Incumbent
- Assumed office 4 October 2025
- Constituency: Prague
- In office 21 October 2017 – 21 October 2021
- Constituency: Prague

Personal details
- Born: 2 July 1985 (age 41) Prague, Czechoslovakia (now Czech Republic)
- Party: ODS (2025–present)
- Other political affiliations: Piráti (2015–2024); Independent (2024–2025)
- Education: Charles University
- Awards: Ukrainian Order of Merit (2022)

Jan Lipavský (born 2 July 1985) is a Czech politician and information technology manager, who served as Minister of Foreign Affairs of the Czech Republic from December 2021 to December 2025, in the Cabinet of Petr Fiala. A former member of the Czech Pirate Party, he was a member of the Chamber of Deputies from October 2017 to October 2021.

== Early life and education ==
Lipavský graduated from the Faculty of Social Sciences of Charles University with a bachelor's degree in Area studies. During his studies, he attended University of Kent through the Erasmus study program.

== Political career ==
=== Member of parliament ===
In the 2017 Czech parliamentary election, Lipavský was elected to the Chamber of Deputies for the Pirate Party. He also ran in the 2021 parliamentary election, but was not elected.

=== Minister of Foreign Affairs ===
After the 2021 election, Lipavský was appointed Minister of Foreign Affairs in Petr Fiala's Cabinet, despite the opposition of President Miloš Zeman.

In his first press statement as Minister of Foreign Affairs, Lipavský stated that his political priorities would be improvement of the Czech Republic's international reputation in the area of human rights, alliance obligations, and international partnerships:

The government's program statement calls for a return to a value-oriented foreign policy and the restoration of the good name of the Czech Republic as a country that stands on the side of human rights. Concrete steps in its implementation will therefore include, for example, the submission of the so-called Magnitsky Act, which will ensure better enforcement of protection human rights. We must be a strong, independent country that is also an equal and reliable partner. The key for us is to strengthen our alliance ties and strengthen our position in the EU and NATO. Relations with Russia and China must undergo a material review. At the same time, it is necessary to prepare the presidency of the Council of the EU, which the Czech Republic will take over in the middle of next year.

— Jan Lipavský, in his first statement as Minister of Foreign Affairs

Lipavský chose the former ambassador to Kuwait, Martin Dvořák, as his political deputy at the Ministry of Foreign Affairs. His first trip abroad was to Slovakia on 20 December 2021.

=== 2022 ===
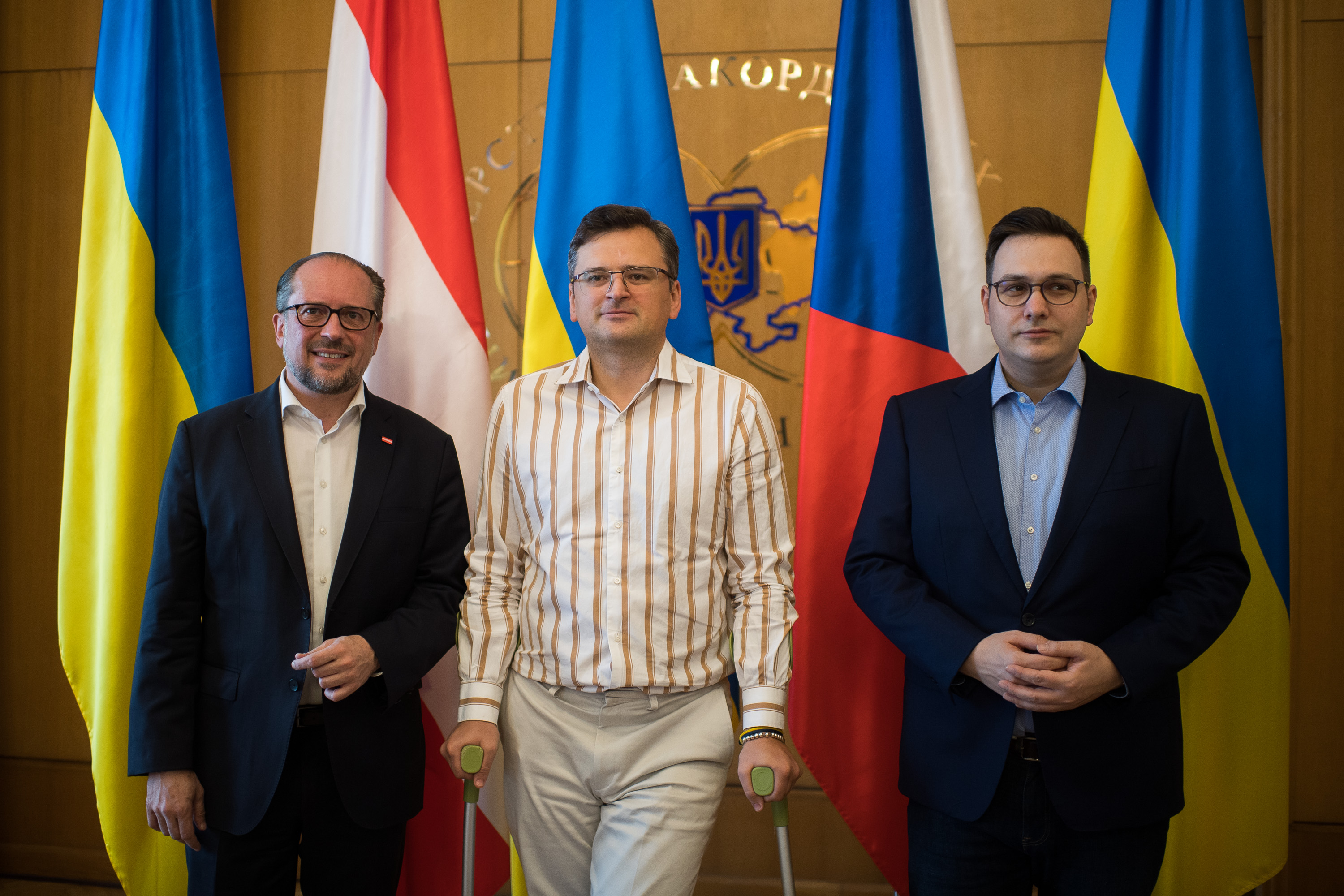
Lipavský with Austrian Foreign Minister Alexander Schallenberg and Ukrainian Foreign Minister Dmytro Kuleba in Kyiv, Ukraine, July 2022

Before the Russian invasion of Ukraine, Lipavský supported the supply of artillery shells to Ukraine, stating that the Czech Republic was preparing for the worst-case scenario in the form of a Russian military invasion. Following the invasion, Lipavský was a strong and vocal supporter of Ukraine, describing Russia as a "terrorist state" and overseeing a new security strategy for the Czech Republic focusing on threats from Russia and China.

In September 2022, Lipavský spoke at the United Nations General Assembly, where he condemned Russia over the annexation of Crimea, the invasion of Ukraine, and human rights violations. Lipavský supported EU sanctions against Iranian officials and entities in response to Iran's violent crackdown on the Mahsa Amini protests.

At the end of October 2022, Lipavský travelled to Qatar for a two-day visit to lead negotiations over the supply of natural gas, and with the aim of improving the environment for business investments. Lipavský also made efforts to improve relations with Saudi Arabia.

=== 2023 ===
In June 2023, Lipavský met Vietnamese Foreign Minister Bùi Thanh Sơn, a member of the Central Committee of the Communist Party of Vietnam, to discuss the strategic partnership between Vietnam and the Czech Republic. He later discussed improvement of economic cooperation and the Russo-Ukrainian War with government representatives in Angola and Zambia.

On 10 October 2023, Lipavský was the first foreign politician to visit Israel after the start of the Gaza war. He met with the President Isaac Herzog and Israeli Minister of Foreign Affairs Eli Cohen to express the Czech Republic's full support for Israel and offer aid.

After Nigeria cancelled a visit by Prime Minister Petr Fiala, scheduled for 6 November 2023, Lipavský rejected any connection with the Czech Republic's support of Israel, and said he "does not attach any deeper meaning" to the cancellation of Fiala's visit.

=== 2024 ===
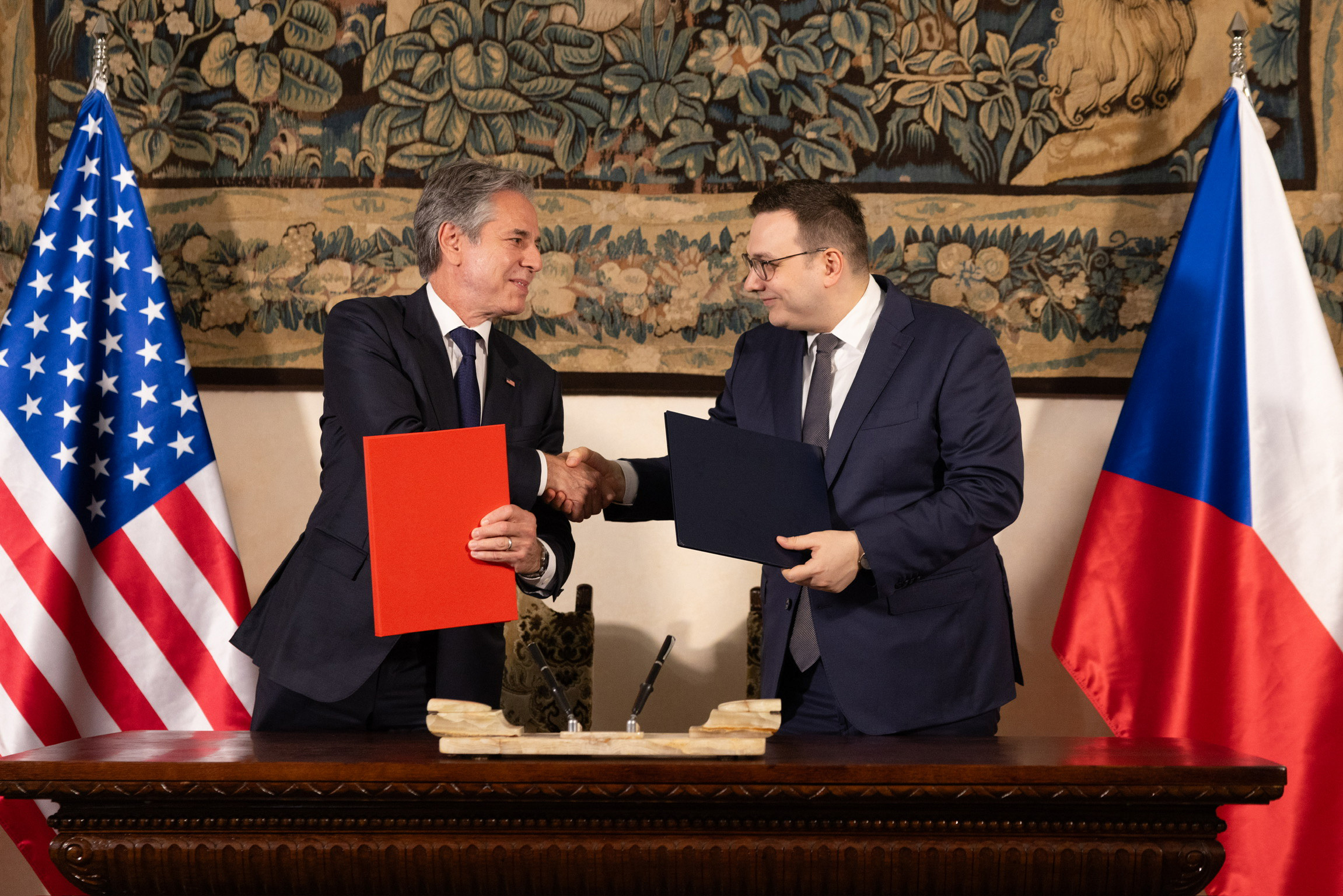
Lipavský with U.S. Secretary of State Antony Blinken in May 2024

On 11 March 2024, ANO leader Andrej Babiš sent an email requesting compromising information on Jan Lipavský and his family, including his children. Intended for his advisers, the email was mistakenly sent to another contact with the same name. The email received widespread criticism, and Lipavský himself called it disgusting. In July, Lipavský attended the 2024 NATO Summit in Washington, D.C., where he met with Israeli Foreign Minister Israel Katz.

When the members of Czech Pirate Party voted to leave the government on 1 October, Lipavský announced his resignation from the party due to differences of opinion. Fiala convinced him during a meeting not to leave the cabinet. Lipavský withdrew his resignation and thus continues to act as an independent Minister of Foreign Affairs in the cabinet.

On 15 November 2024, students at University College London (UCL) protested the visit of Jan Lipavský, criticizing the Czech government's support for Israel.

=== 2025 ===
On 5 March 2025, it was announced that Lipavský would seek election in the 2025 Czech parliamentary election on behalf of the Civic Democratic Party (ODS).

Lipavský called the June 2025 Israeli strikes on Iran a "reasonable reaction" to Iran's threat of a nuclear bomb and support for Hamas and Hezbollah. He said he has "a great deal of understanding for ... military action aimed at preventing the production of a nuclear bomb."

In September 2025, Lipavský rejected accusations of denying the Gaza genocide. He wrote an article in the Israel Journal of Foreign Affairs in November 2025, calling on Israel to support Ukraine, to "enhance its own security, strategic autonomy, and moral standing".

== Foreign policy positions ==
=== China ===
In April 2020, Lipavský called on the Czech government to ask China for compensation for the damages caused as a result of the COVID-19 pandemic, arguing that China bears a significant share of the blame for the spread of COVID-19 over the world.

On 15 January 2022, Lipavský criticised the Czech ambassador to China, Vladimír Tomšík, for statements regarding the 2022 Winter Olympic Games. Tomšík, instructed by President Zeman to show the "maximum possible support" for the games in China, stated that the Games had wide support in the Czech Republic. In response, Lipavský accused Tomšík of comments that served "for the benefit of Chinese state propaganda".

In June 2022, Lipavský criticised China's repressive policies against the Uighur people, which some Western governments and NGOs have described as genocide.

=== Russia ===
Lipavský criticised the response of President Zeman to the 2014 Vrbětice ammunition warehouse explosions. On 9 May 2021, following Russia's involvement in this case, he described the participation of the Czech ambassador to Russia in a military parade in Moscow as "scandalous".

In an interview with ČT24 in October 2021, Lipavský commented that Russia and China "represent a phenomenon of threat to the Czech Republic. It is necessary for Czech foreign policy to properly reflect this in all strategic documents, but also multiple practical steps on the international scene."

In February 2023, Lipavský declared at a UN Security Council meeting: "Together, we must defend the UN Charter and ensure that war crimes are held accountable under international law." He called President of Russia Vladimir Putin a war criminal and welcomed the arrest warrant issued for him by the International Criminal Court in March 2023. During the 2023 Vilnius summit, Lipavský supported Ukraine's entry into NATO, stating that "Vladimir Putin's motives for going to war against Ukraine are probably based on his completely wrong vision of the world through the lens of the Soviet empire."

In October 2024, Lipavský claimed that Russia was "responsible for 80% of foreign influence operations in the world".

=== Turkey ===
In October 2019, Lipavský condemned the Turkish offensive into north-eastern Syria against Kurds in the Rojava territory, stating: "in the long term, it is completely unacceptable for Turkey to occupy the north of the Syrian territory. Europe must continue to find a unified position against the aggressive Turkish regime of President Recep Tayyip Erdoğan."

At a meeting of foreign ministers of the Visegrad Group in December 2021, Lipavský pointed out the key role of Turkey in solving migration. During the visit of the Turkish foreign minister Mevlüt Çavuşoğlu to Prague in June 2022, Lipavský stated there is a need for a "thorough dialogue" on issues where it is not easy to find an agreement between Turkey and the EU, such as migration or respect for the rule of law.

=== Other ===
In June 2019, Lipavský welcomed the proposal of German Minister of the Interior Horst Seehofer, that the Sudeten German congress would be held in the Czech Republic in the future.

In September 2019, Lipavský described as "shameful" Miloš Zeman's comments that Kosovo is a state led by war criminals. He also disagreed with Zeman's proposal to revoke the Czech Republic's recognition of Kosovo.

In September 2020, Lipavský supported the deployment of Czech soldiers in Iraq and Afghanistan. He criticised the Czech government for being slow to evacuate Czech diplomats and Afghan collaborators, who were put in danger following the withdrawal of U.S. troops in 2021.

Lipavský does not support moving the Czech Embassy in Israel from Tel Aviv to Jerusalem.

== Honours ==
- 30 August 2022 - Order of Merit from President of Ukraine Volodymyr Zelenskyy for supporting Ukraine
- 16 November 2022 - Magnitsky Prize for contribution to the protection of human rights
