= 2011 TOP 09 leadership election =

- 19 June 2010
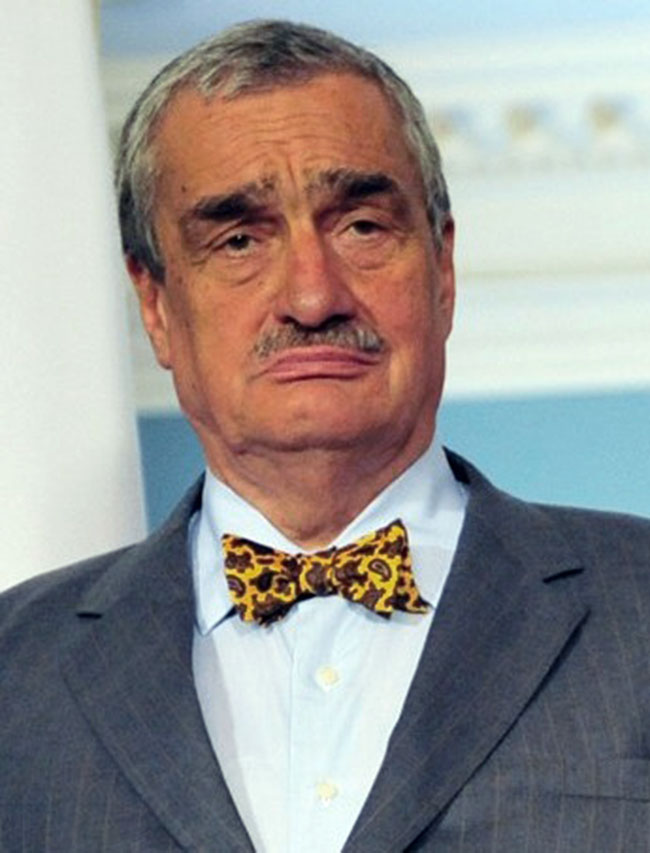
Nominee	Karel Schwarzenberg
Party	TOP 09
Electoral vote	162
Percentage	95.9%
Leader of TOP 09 before election
Karel Schwarzenberg
Elected Leader of TOP 09
Karel Schwarzenberg

A leadership election was held in the TOP 09 party in the Czech Republic on 23 October 2011. Incumbent Karel Schwarzenberg was unopposed. He received 162 of the 169 votes. Schwarzenberg also accepted party's nomination for the 2013 presidential elections.

== Results ==
Candidate	Votes	%
Karel Schwarzenberg	162	95.9
Against	7	4.1
Total	169	100
