= Jan Kavan =

Czech politician

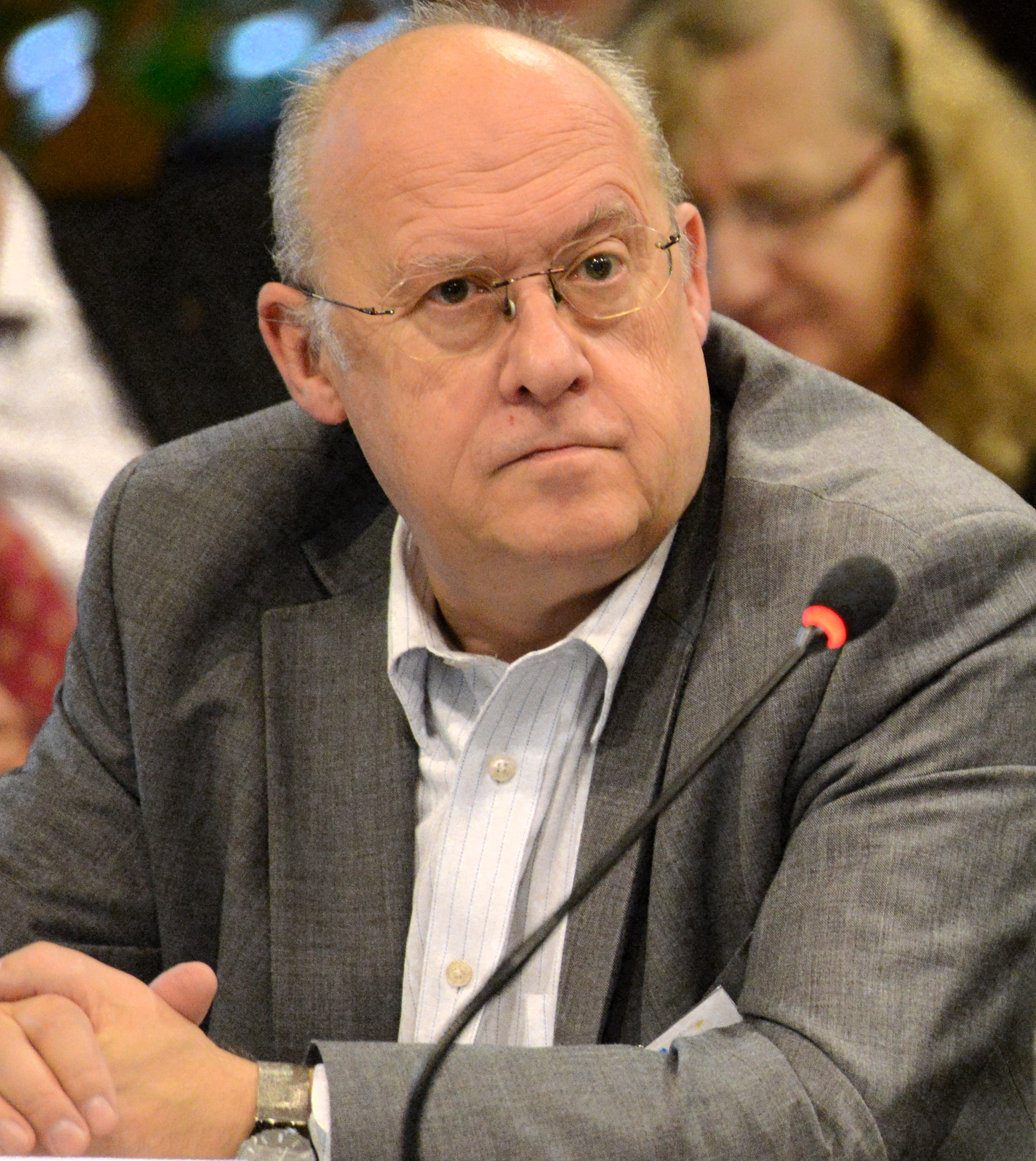
- Kavan in 2014

President of the United Nations General Assembly
- In office 15 September 2002 – 16 September 2003
- Preceded by: Han Seung-soo
- Succeeded by: Julian Hunte

3rd Minister of Foreign Affairs of the Czech Republic
- In office 22 July 1998 – 12 July 2002
- Prime Minister: Miloš Zeman
- Preceded by: Jaroslav Šedivý
- Succeeded by: Cyril Svoboda

Senator from Prostějov
- In office 23 November 1996 – 23 November 2000
- Preceded by: Office established
- Succeeded by: Robert Kolář

Member of the Federal Assembly
- In office 7 June 1990 – 4 June 1992

Member of the Chamber of Deputies
- In office 15 June 2002 – 15 June 2006

Personal details
- Born: 17 October 1946 (age 79) London, United Kingdom
- Party: SOCDEM
- Other political affiliations: Labour Party (1972-1990)
- Education: Charles University, London School of Economics, University of Reading
- Profession: Politician

Jan Kavan (born 17 October 1946) is a Czech former politician and diplomat.

== Biography ==
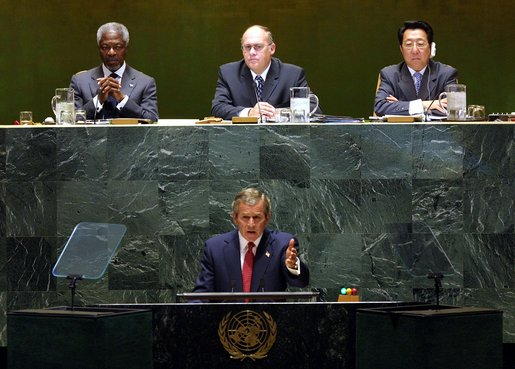
Kavan as President of the United Nations General Assembly (below him President of the United States George W. Bush)

Kavan was born in London as the son of a Czechoslovak diplomat, Pavel Kavan, and a British teacher, Rosemary Kavanová. Kavan moved back to Czechoslovakia with his parents as a child. His father was then arrested in a Communist Party purge and sentenced to 25 years in prison in a show trial in the 1950s. He was eventually released, but died in 1960 aged 46. Kavan's mother later wrote a memoir, Love and Freedom. Kavan was one of the student leaders of the Prague Spring movement in 1968. When the movement was crushed by the Soviet occupation of Czechoslovakia, Kavan emigrated to the United Kingdom, the country of his birth, where he was a member of the Labour Party from 1972 to 1990.

Kavan is member of the Social Democracy (SOCDEM). He was the Minister of Foreign Affairs of the Czech Republic from 1998 to 2002 and one of the deputy prime ministers from 1999 to 2002. He was a member of the Czechoslovak Federal Assembly from 1990 to 1992, member of the Senate of the Czech Republic from 1996 to 2000, and a member of the Chamber of Deputies from 2002 to 2006. He was elected President of the United Nations General Assembly and acted in this office from 2002 to 2003.

Before returning to former Czechoslovakia after the fall of the Communist government, Kavan spent 20 years in exile in the UK. While in exile he was the editor-in-chief of the Palach Press, a press agency. He was also editor of the East European Reporter and vice-president of the East European Cultural Foundation, both organizations having been founded by him. In 1991, back in Czechoslovakia, Kavan was wrongly accused of collaboration with the Czechoslovak secret service (StB) in the years 1969–1970. He was totally cleared of the charges by a Prague Municipal Court in 1994 and finally, after a renewed process, by a Court of Appeals in January 1996.

He received several honorary degrees, including Honorary Fellow of the London School of Economics, Honorary Professor of Human Rights, Adelphi University of New York, and a number of human rights awards including Companion of Honour (UK), International Order of Merit (UK), and Presidential Roll of Honor (USA).

Kavan was educated at the Charles University in Prague, the London School of Economics and the University of Reading. He is divorced and has four children.

Government offices
Preceded by Jaroslav Šedivý	Minister of Foreign Affairs of the Czech Republic; 1998–2002	Succeeded by Cyril Svoboda
Positions in intergovernmental organisations
Preceded by Han Seung-soo	President of the United Nations General Assembly; 2002–2003	Succeeded by Julian Hunte
