= Jakub Kulhánek =

Czech diplomat and politician

His Excellency Jakub Kulhánek
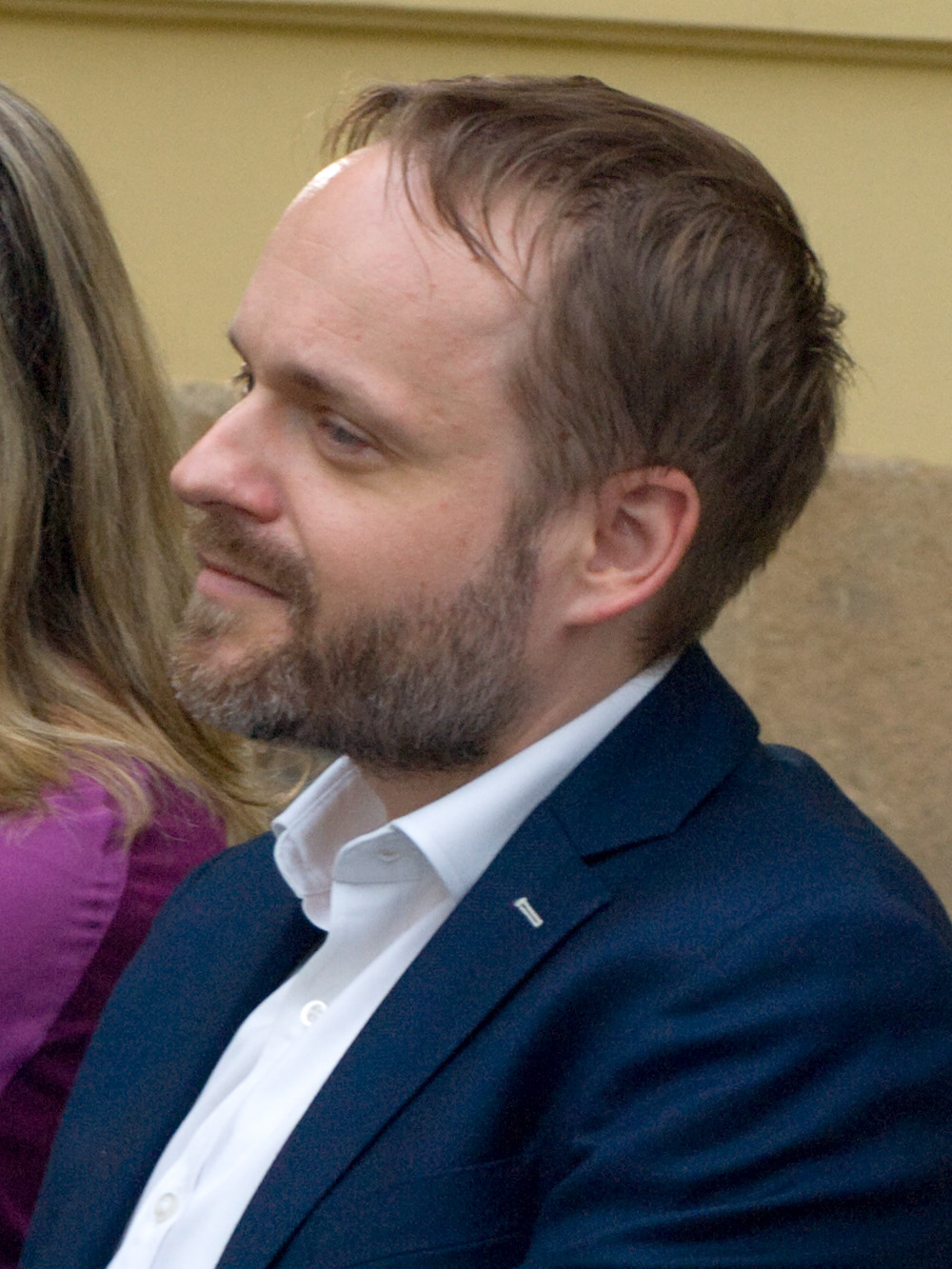

Permanent Representative of the Czech Republic to the United Nations
- Incumbent
- Assumed office 15 February 2022
- President: Miloš Zeman; Petr Pavel
- Preceded by: Marie Chatardová

Minister of Foreign Affairs
- In office 21 April 2021 – 17 December 2021
- Prime Minister: Andrej Babiš
- Preceded by: Jan Hamáček
- Succeeded by: Jan Lipavský

Personal details
- Born: 30 June 1984 (age 42) Mělník, Czechoslovakia
- Party: Social Democracy (until 2023)
- Education: Charles University

Jakub Kulhánek (born 30 June 1984) is a Czech diplomat and politician who served as Minister of Foreign Affairs of the Czech Republic from April to December 2021. Since 2023, he has been the Czech ambassador to the United Nations.

== Early life ==
Kulhánek graduated from Charles University in area studies and received a Master of Arts degree in international relations from Georgetown University. He was employed as a consultant by CEFC China Energy and worked as an analyst with the Association for International Issues.

== Political career ==
From 2013 until 2017, Kulhánek worked as a parliamentary advisor to then-chairman of the Chamber of Deputies of the Czech Republic, Jan Hamáček. In 2014, he served as deputy Minister of Defence of the Czech Republic to Martin Stropnický. Kulhánek also worked as an advisor to Prime Minister Bohuslav Sobotka during the latter's tenure as prime minister.

=== 2019–2020: European Parliament and Czech regional elections ===
Kulhánek stood for the European Parliament in the 2019 European Parliament election as a candidate of Social Democracy. He received 595 preferential votes and did not become an MEP.

During the 2020 Czech regional elections, Kulhánek was elected as a member of the ČSSD in the Central Bohemian Region, where he received 136 preferential votes.

=== Minister of Foreign Affairs of the Czech Republic ===
In April 2021, after Lubomír Zaorálek rejected his candidacy as Minister of Foreign Affairs of the Czech Republic, ČSSD requested Kulhánek to hold the position in the Second Cabinet of Andrej Babiš. On 15 April, following a meeting with President Miloš Zeman at Lány Castle, Zeman appointed Kulhánek as foreign minister on 21 April.

On 14 May 2021, in response to the 2021 Israel–Palestine crisis, Kulhánek decided to display the Israeli flag at Czernin Palace as a sign of solidarity with Israel, declaring that "Israel is facing an absolutely outrageous and barbaric attack".

=== Czech ambassador to the United Nations ===
On 15 February 2022, Kulhánek was appointed Permanent Representative of the Czech Republic to the United Nations, an occupation he hinted during his tenure as foreign minister in the second cabinet of Andrej Babiš.

In 2023, Kulhánek resigned from ČSSD after disagreement with the party leadership course represented by Michal Šmarda.

== Personal life ==
Kulhánek has a daughter with his partner.
