= Czech Republic–Israel relations =

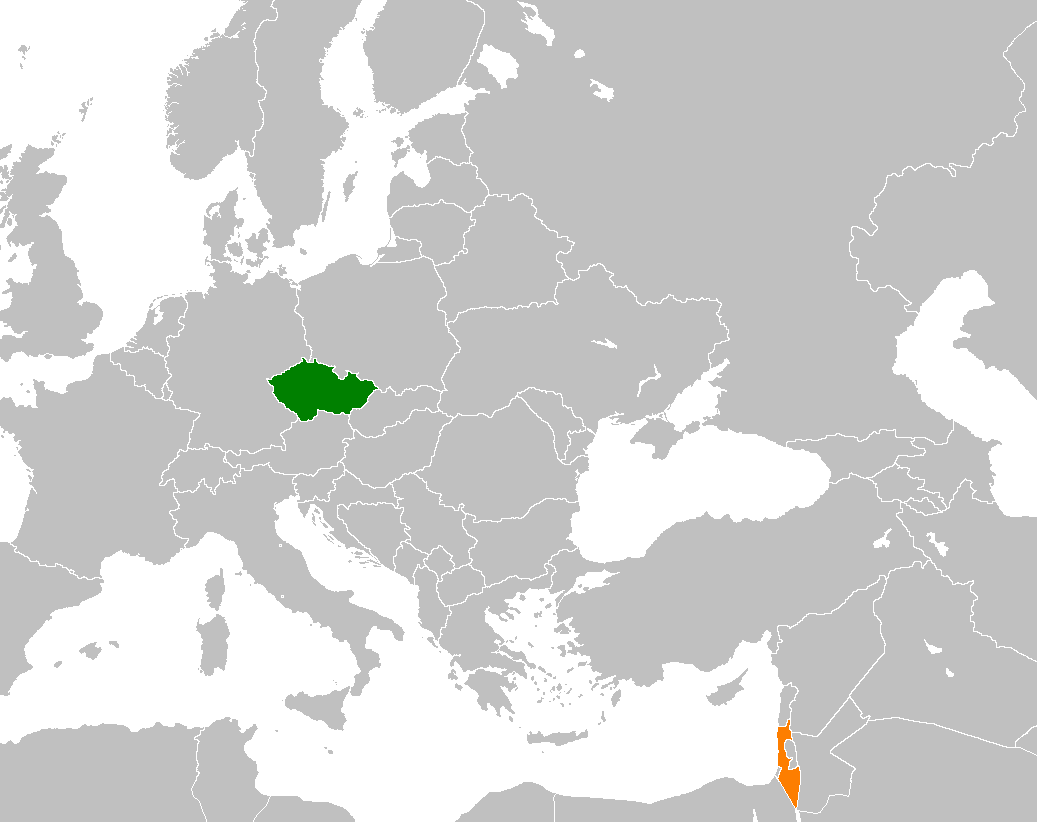
- Czech Republic: Israel

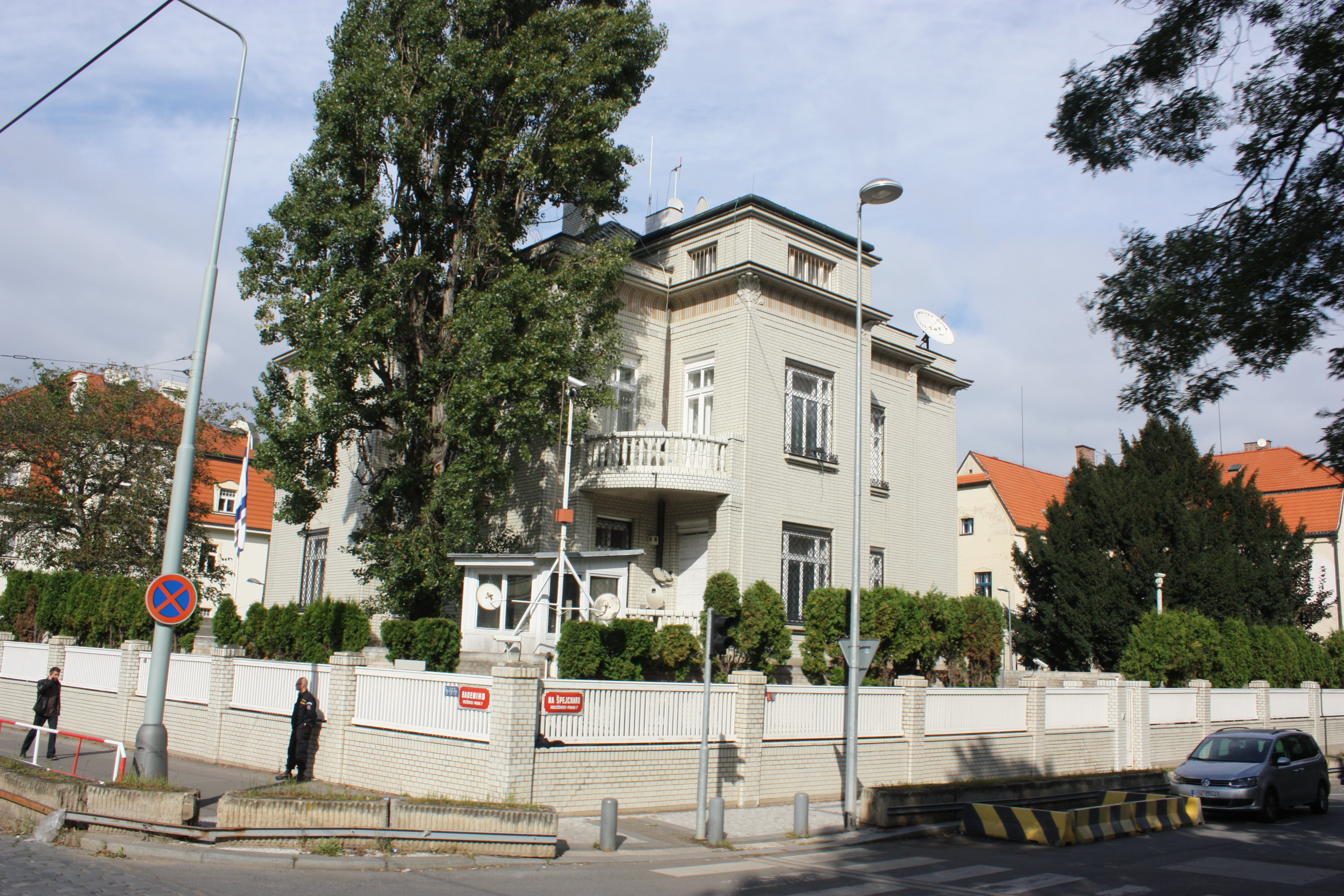
Israeli embassy in Prague, Czech Republic

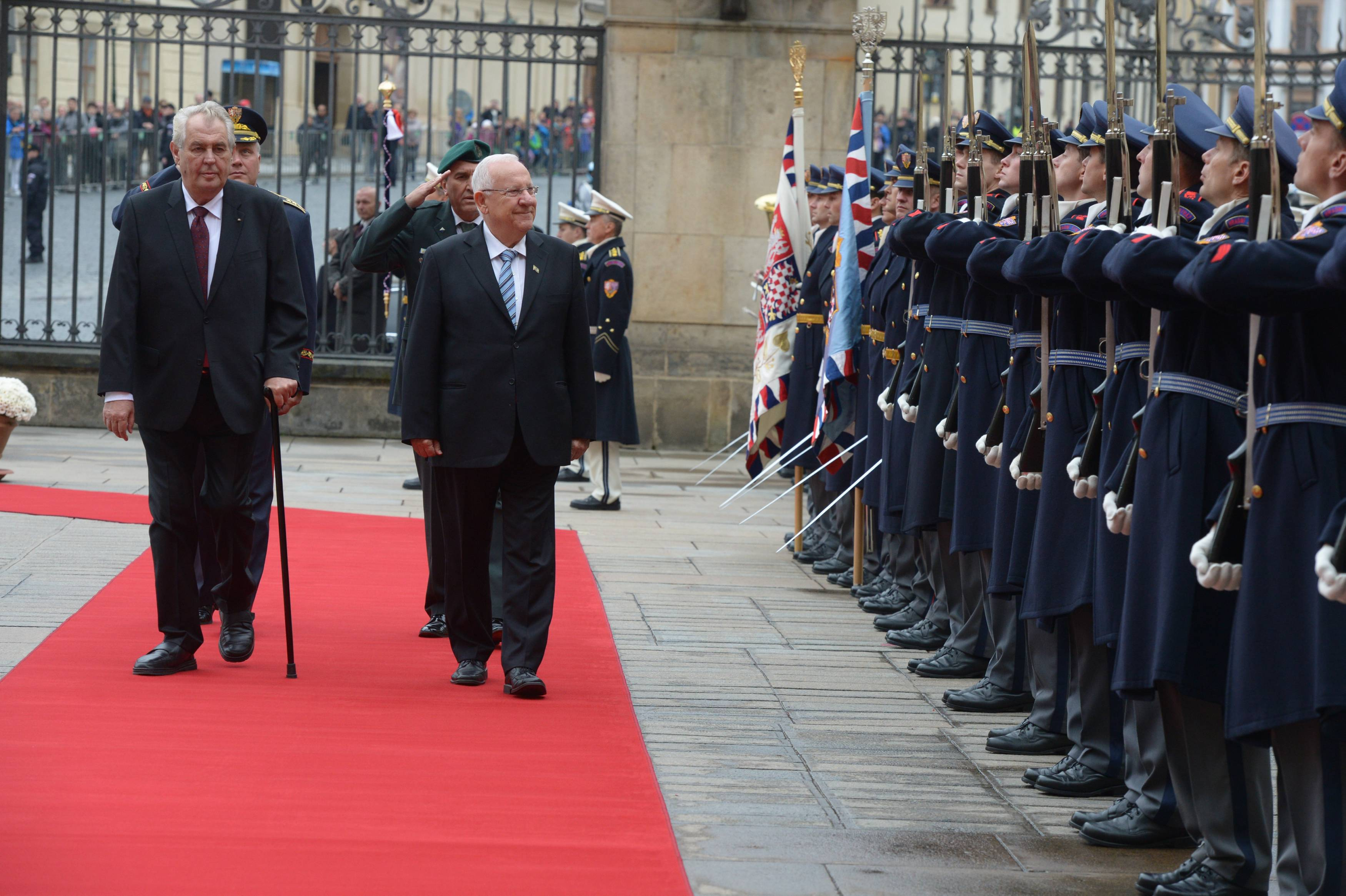
Reuven Rivlin's visit to Czech Republic, October 2015

Relations between Israel and the Czech Republic, and its predecessor state Czechoslovakia, have varied widely over time.

The historical and ideological roots of this international relationship, which would prove crucial for the establishment of Israel in 1948, can be traced back to the early 19th century, and the emerging Czech-Jewish alliance in Prague. By 1938, virtually all groups of Jews in the Bohemian Lands, Czech assimilationists, German liberals, and Zionists, were closely attached to the Czechoslovak government and integrated in the centre-left elite of the country (but excluded from the right). The links between T.G. Masaryk and Zionist circles in Prague and beyond, mark the crucial node that would lead to Czechoslovak military assistance to the nascent Israeli state around 1948.

After this peak, Czechoslovakia-Israel relations deteriorated, and the two countries did not have diplomatic relations during most of the Communist rule in Czechoslovakia. However, after the Velvet Revolution and dissolution of Czechoslovakia the countries re-established contact, and the Czech Republic is now one of Israel's closest allies, frequently demonstrating strong support for Israel at the United Nations and within the European Union.

In March 2021, the Czech Republic opened a diplomatic office in Jerusalem.

== History ==
=== Israeli relations with Czechoslovakia ===
The founder of Czechoslovakia, President Tomáš Garrigue Masaryk, had close relations with the Zionist Movement. In 1920 he became the first statesman to visit the first Jewish kibbutz in Mandatory Palestine.^{:50}

Czechoslovakia was one of 33 countries to vote in favour of the 1947 UN partition resolution recommending the establishment of a Jewish state, and was among the first countries to recognize the State of Israel, which it did on 18 May 1948, four days after Israel's declaration of independence. Diplomatic relations between the countries were established on 3 July 1948, four months after the Communists seized power in Czechoslovakia. Czechoslovakia supported the newly created state for several months with military aircraft and weapons. However the Communist government later ceased this support and after the 1967 Arab-Israeli War diplomatic relations were broken.

Following the 1989 Velvet Revolution, diplomatic relations were re-established between Israel and the newly democratic Czechoslovakia.

=== Israeli relations with the Czech Republic ===
After the dissolution of Czechoslovakia in 1993, diplomatic relations were established between Israel and the two successor states, the Czech Republic and Slovakia.

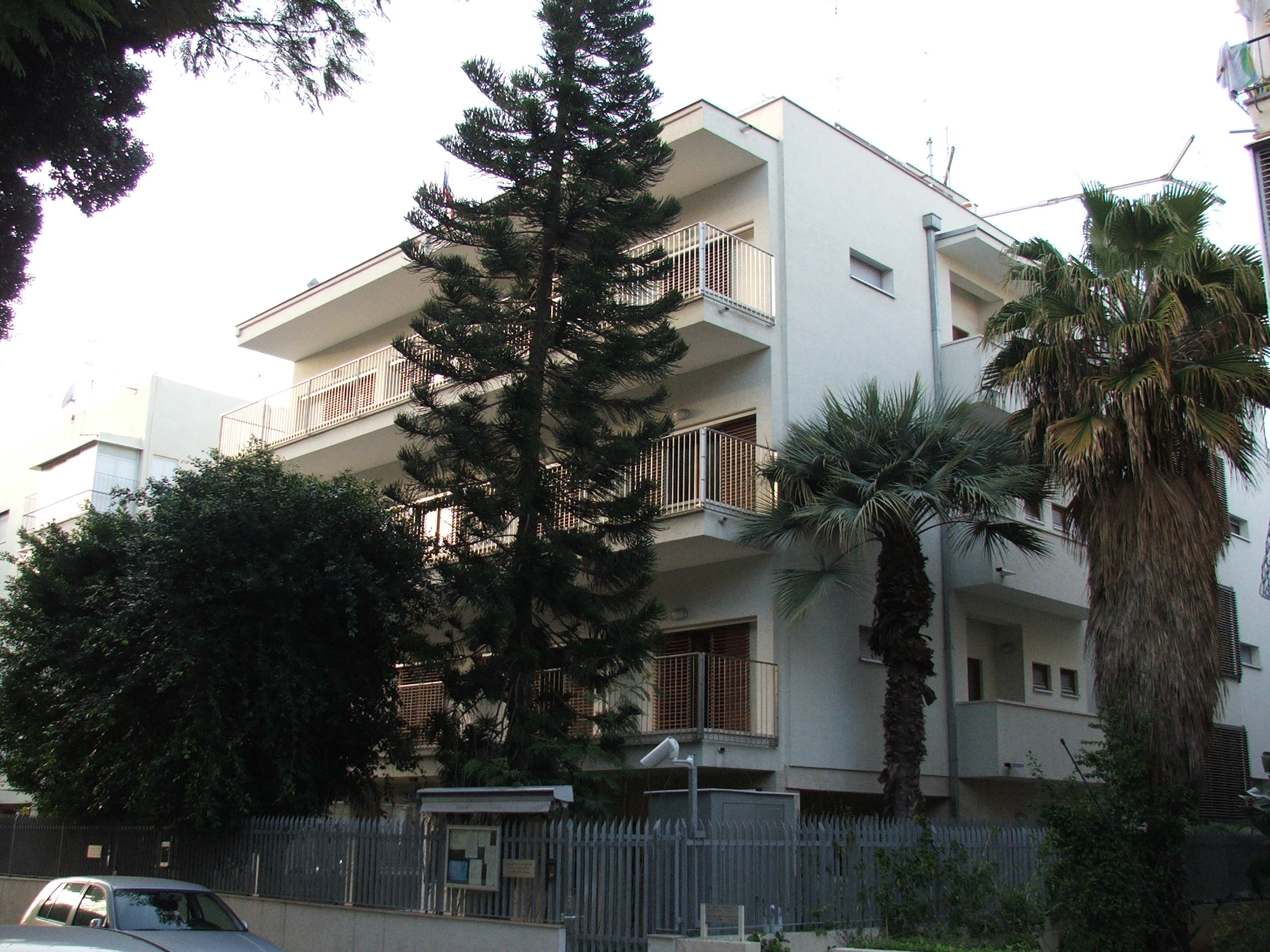
Czech Embassy, White City of Tel Aviv

In December 2008 the Czech Air Force wanted to train in desert conditions for the upcoming mission in Afghanistan, and Israel offered their desert areas for this purpose, to thank the Czechs for training Israeli pilots when the country was first established.

The current Czech government is one of Israel's closest allies. After the 2010 Gaza flotilla raid the Czech Republic expressed its support for Israel. President of the Senate Přemysl Sobotka visited Israel on 2 June 2010 and addressed the Israeli Knesset, describing the flotilla as a planned provocation designed to entrap Israel. Sobotka met with Knesset Speaker Reuven Rivlin and expressed support for the classification of Hamas as a terrorist organization.

In a United Nations General Assembly vote on 29 November 2012, the Czech Republic was the only European country to vote with Israel against upgrading the status of Palestine to a "non-member observer state".

During a visit to Prague in May 2012, Israeli Prime Minister Benjamin Netanyahu said that Israel had "no better friend in Europe than the Czech Republic". During a visit to Israel in November 2014, Czech Foreign Minister Lubomír Zaorálek claimed that Czech media and society viewed Israel as "a trusted friend, a vibrant democracy, and an economic and technological powerhouse", adding that the Czech Republic had one of the lowest levels of anti-Semitism in Europe. In 2015, Israel Foreign Affairs Minister Moshe Arens described Czech-Israel relations as "excellent", and the best of all nations in the European Union.

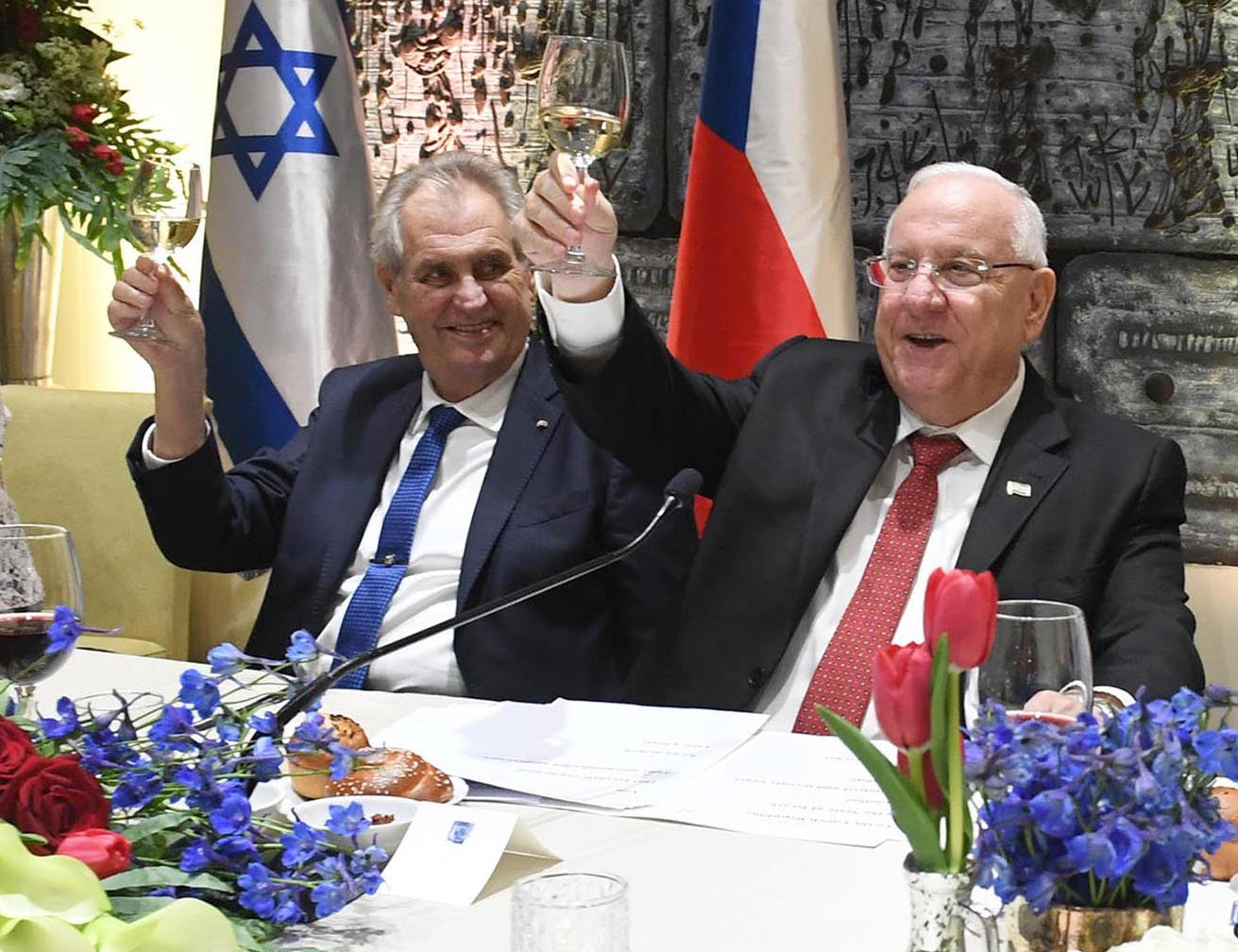
Israeli President Reuven Rivlin at state dinner in honor of Czech president Milos Zeman, 2018

In December 2015 the Czech Parliament refused to implement European Union guidelines to label Israeli products originating from the West Bank, East Jerusalem and the Golan Heights. Czech lawmakers described the rules as anti-Semitic, and discrimination against "the only democracy in the Middle East". Israel's ambassador Gary Koren thanked the parliament for its decision.

In October 2016 Czech Parliament passed a motion condemning a UNESCO resolution on Palestine which omitted reference to the Jewish heritage of the Western Wall and other historical sites in Jerusalem, with deputies accusing UNESCO of antisemitism and describing the resolution as "hateful" during the parliamentary discussion. Ofir Akunis, Israeli Minister of Science, Technology and Space, thanked the Czech Parliament and the country, describing it as a "heroic act" and reaffirming the close relationship between the countries.

In May 2017 the Chamber of Deputies passed a non-binding resolution condemning another UNESCO resolution critical of Israel, and calling on the Czech government to advocate recognition of Jerusalem as the capital of Israel. The resolution also called for the Czech Republic to withhold its annual funding to UNESCO.

On 22 October 2019, the Chamber of Deputies passed a non-binding resolution "condemn[ing] all activities and statements by groups calling for a boycott of the State of Israel, its goods, services or citizens." The resolution was introduced by Jan Bartošek, leader of the Populars caucus in the chamber.

On 11 March 2021, Czech Prime Minister Andrej Babiš opened the Czech diplomatic office in Jerusalem, the second European Union country to do so, after Hungary.

In July 2022, Israeli President Isaac Herzog made a state visit to the Czech Republic. At Prague Castle, President Herzog awarded the Israeli Presidential Medal of Honor to Czech President Miloš Zeman, hailing his Czech counterpart's "deep friendship with the Jewish People, his consistent support for Israel on the international stage, and his 'zero tolerance' policy toward terrorism and antisemitism."

On 25 October 2023, Czech Prime Minister Petr Fiala made a visit to Israel where he expressed the Czech Republic's support for Israel following the October 7 attacks, and met with Prime Minister Benjamin Netanyahu and President Herzog. Earlier that month, he had proposed accelerating the move of the Czech embassy from Tel Aviv to Jerusalem. Prime Minister Netanyahu had an official visit to the Czech Republic planned for early October, accompanied by ministers of his cabinet, which was cancelled due to the attacks.

In January 2024, Czech President Petr Pavel made a two-day visit to Israel in light of the ongoing Gaza war. During the visit, President Pavel met with Israeli officials including Prime Minister Netanyahu and President Herzog, where he expressed support for Israel while also stating concerns over humanitarian aid and civilian casualties in Gaza.

In May 2024, Czech Republic was one of the nine countries which voted against Palestine's UN membership. Czech Republic is considered to be one of Israel's closest allies in Europe. In 2024, Fiala called the ICC arrest warrant for Israeli Prime Minister Netanyahu "appalling and unacceptable."

Prime Minister Fiala described the Czech Republic as "Israel’s voice in Europe" and systematically opposed UN and European Union resolutions that criticized Israel's actions or sought sanctions against Israel. Czech arms exports to Israel doubled between 2022 and 2024 under the government of Petr Fiala. In September 2025, the Italian port of Ravenna blocked the shipment of weapons to Israel, which likely originated from the Czech Republic.

== Diplomatic offices and co-operation ==
The Czech Republic has an embassy in Tel Aviv and 3 honorary consulates (in Haifa, Jerusalem and Ramat Gan). Israel has an embassy in Prague. Both countries are full members of the Union for the Mediterranean.

== Trade ==
Trade between Israel and the Czech Republic is influenced by the EU-Israel Free Trade Agreement of 1995.

Czech - Israeli trade in millions USD-$
	Israel imports Czech Republic exports	Czech Republic imports Israel exports	Total trade value
2023	847.7	199.6	1047.3
2022	857	176	1033
2021	826.1	154.9	981
2020	670	123.9	793.9
2019	698.7	135.4	834.1
2018	660.6	184.1	844.7
2017	572.8	143.9	716.7
2016	612.4	130.9	743.3
2015	469.8	127	596.8
2014	607	168.1	775.1
2013	534.7	148.6	683.3
2012	516.5	172.3	688.8
2011	389.2	158.1	547.3
2010	268.1	149.9	418
2009	188	132.3	320.3
2008	165.6	161.6	327.2
2007	136.4	132.6	269
2006	111.5	107.3	218.8
2005	96.6	65.5	162.1
2004	104.1	72.9	177
2003	76.8	53.7	130.5
2002	75.8	42.2	118

== Tourism ==
In 1996, Israel and the Czech Republic abolished the need for visas for each other's citizens to travel, and both offer working holiday visas.

Tourism of Czechs in Israel and Israelis in Czech Republic
	2023	2022	2021	2020	2019	2018	2017	2016	2015	2014	2013	2012
Tourists from Czech Republic Arriving to Israel	31,100	20,300	3,100	8,200	32,400	31,700	24,300	15,900	14,200	16,800	15,000	13,800
Tourists from Israel Arriving to Czech Republic	117,368	141,263	74,926	22,249	161,217	162,774	183,948	168,638	140,643	116,390	104,542	93,510

== Resident diplomatic missions ==
- the Czech Republic has an embassy in Tel Aviv.
- Israel has an embassy in Prague.

== See also ==
- Foreign relations of the Czech Republic
- Foreign relations of Israel
- History of the Jews in the Czech Republic
- International recognition of Israel
