= Josef Zieleniec =

Czech politician

Member of the European Parliament
- In office 12 June 2004 – 2009

1st Minister of Foreign Affairs of the Czech Republic
- In office 1 January 1993 – 23 October 1997
- Succeeded by: Jaroslav Šedivý

Personal details
- Born: April 28, 1946 (age 80) Moscow, RSFSR, Soviet Union
- Party: Public Affairs
- Other political affiliations: Civic Democratic Party (1992–1998); SNK European Democrats (2004–9)
- Education: VŠE
- Profession: Economist, Politician

Josef Zieleniec (born 28 May 1946) is a Czech politician and former Member of the European Parliament. From 2004, was a member of the SNK European Democrats (SNK-ED). In the European Parliament, he was a member of the European People's Party and served on the European Parliament's Committee on Foreign Affairs and Committee on Economic and Monetary Affairs. Zieleniec is currently a lecturer at the Prague academic center of New York University.

== Early life and education ==
Zieleniec was born in Moscow to Polish parents. He received his master's degree in 1974 from the University of Economics, Prague, and in 1986 received a postgraduate Candidate of Science from the Czechoslovak Academy of Sciences in Prague.

== Academic career ==
Zieleniec spent most of his professional career as an economist. From 1973 until the fall of the communist regime in 1989, he worked first as a research fellow in the Institute of Research in Engineering Technology and Economics Research, and later at the Institute of Economics of the Czechoslovak Academy of Sciences. Apart from research in microeconomic theory, he worked on the problems of economic transition from a centrally planned to market economy. The study "Czechoslovakia at the crossroads", based on his research, had a significant impact on the discussions about economic reforms after 1989.

At the beginning of 1990 Zieleniec co-founded the Center for Economic Research and Graduate Education, the first American-style economics doctoral program in Central and Eastern Europe, at Charles University in Prague. He became its first director, and was also appointed senior lecturer in economics and joined the Scientific Council of the Faculty of Social Sciences at Charles University. From 1998 to 2003 he was a businessman.

== Political career ==
From 1992 to 1997 he was vice-chairman of the Civic Democratic Party (ODS). In 1992 he was appointed Minister for Foreign Relations of Czechoslovakia. From 1993 to 1997 he was Foreign Minister of the Czech Republic, and from 1996 to 1997 he was Deputy Prime Minister of the Czech Republic. He was a Member of the Chamber of Deputies of the Czech Republic between 1996 and 2000, and in 2000 he was elected for a four-year term to the Czech Senate. Since 2004 he has been the political leader of the SNK European Democrats.

== See also ==
- 2004 European Parliament election in the Czech Republic

Government offices
Preceded by -	Minister of Foreign Affairs of the Czech Republic; 1993–1997	Succeeded by Jaroslav Šedivý
