= Jan Kohout =

Czech diplomat and politician

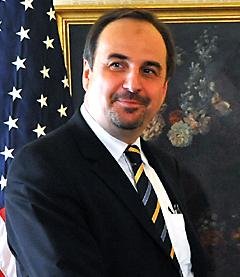

Minister of Foreign Affairs of the Czech Republic
- In office 10 July 2013 – 29 January 2014
- Prime Minister: Jiří Rusnok
- Preceded by: Karel Schwarzenberg
- Succeeded by: Lubomír Zaorálek
- In office 8 May 2009 – 13 July 2010
- Prime Minister: Jan Fischer
- Preceded by: Karel Schwarzenberg
- Succeeded by: Karel Schwarzenberg

Permanent Representative of the Czech Republic to the European Union
- In office 19 May 2004 – 2 January 2008
- Preceded by: Pavel Telička
- Succeeded by: Milena Vicenová

Personal details
- Born: 29 March 1961 (age 65) Plzeň, Czechoslovakia
- Party: KSČ (1986–1989); Social Democratic Party (1995–2009)
- Children: 2
- Education: Charles University

Jan Kohout (born 29 March 1961) is a Czech diplomat and politician. He was Minister of Foreign Affairs of the Czech Republic in caretaker governments of Jan Fischer and Jiří Rusnok. Between 1986–1989 he had been a member of the Communist Party of Czechoslovakia; since 1995 is a member of the Social Democratic Party but before accepting the office of Foreign Minister he suspended party membership.

After the Velvet revolution, he entered the Czechoslovak and later Czech Ministry of Foreign Affairs. He served as Ambassador to the EU in Brussels as well as Deputy Foreign Minister. After Prime Minister Vladimír Špidla resigned in 2004, Kohout was offered the post but refused; Stanislav Gross took over as Premier.

Kohout is a graduate of the Faculty of Arts of the Charles University in Prague. He is divorced and has two children.

Political offices
Preceded by Karel Schwarzenberg	Minister of Foreign Affairs; 2009–2010	Succeeded by Karel Schwarzenberg
Preceded by Karel Schwarzenberg	Minister of Foreign Affairs; 2013–2014	Succeeded by Lubomír Zaorálek
