= Jaroslav Šedivý =

Czech politician (1929–2023)

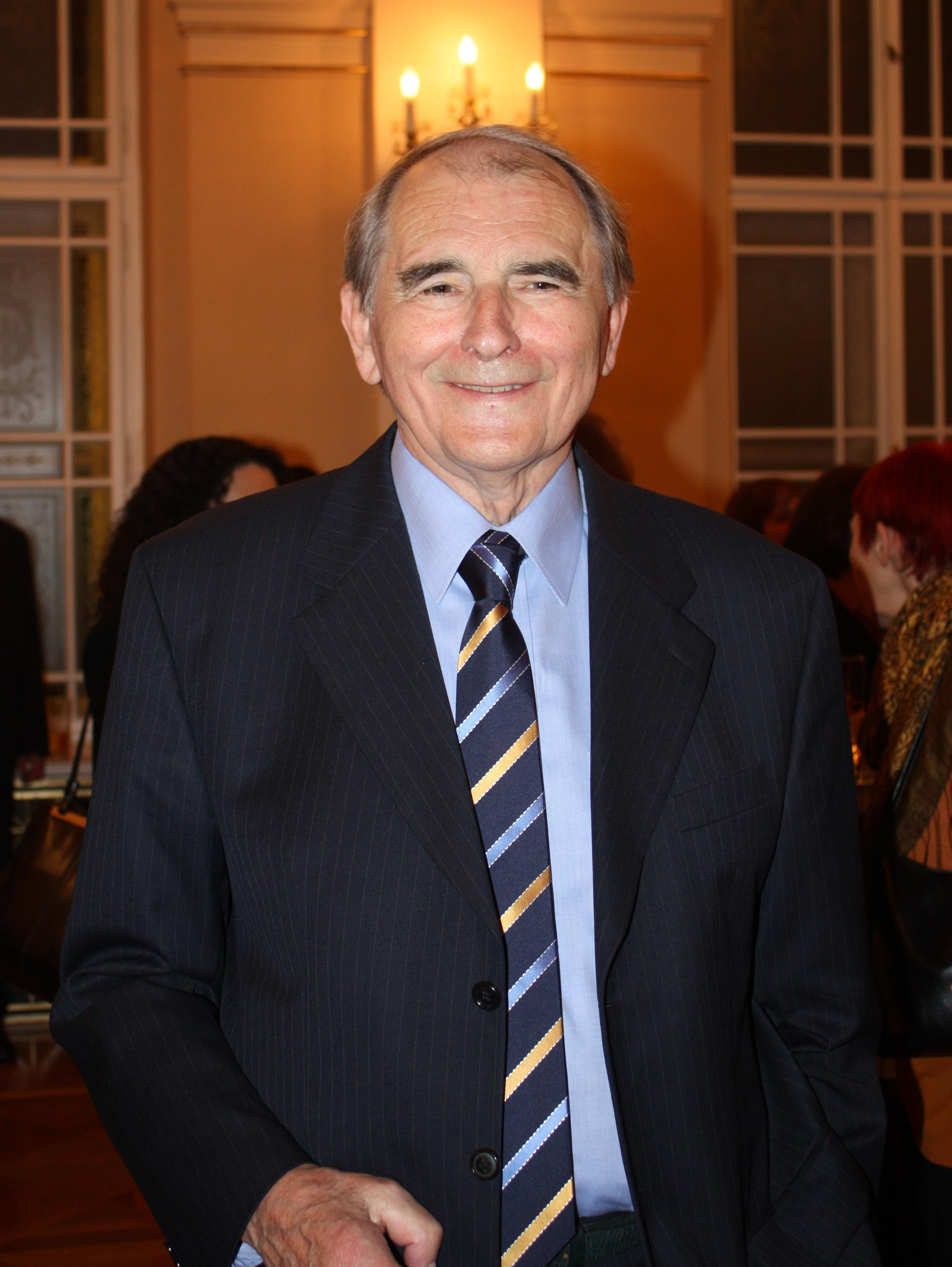

2nd Minister of Foreign Affairs of the Czech Republic
- In office 8 November 1997 – 17 July 1998
- Prime Minister: Václav Klaus; Josef Tošovský
- Preceded by: Josef Zieleniec
- Succeeded by: Jan Kavan

Personal details
- Born: 12 November 1929 Prague, Czechoslovakia
- Died: 28 January 2023 (aged 93)
- Party: Independent
- Education: Charles University
- Profession: Politician

Jaroslav Šedivý (12 November 1929 – 28 January 2023) was a Czech politician who served as the second Minister of Foreign Affairs of the Czech Republic, from 8 November 1997 until 17 July 1998. A historian, Šedivý was active in dissident movement against the communist regime. His son Jiří Šedivý served as Minister of Defense in 2006–2007.

In 2026, Šedivý was posthumously awarded the Order of Tomáš Garrigue Masaryk III. class
