= Ministry of Foreign Affairs (Czech Republic) =

Government ministry of the Czech Republic

Ministry of Foreign Affairs of the Czech Republic
- Ministerstvo zahraničních věcí České republiky
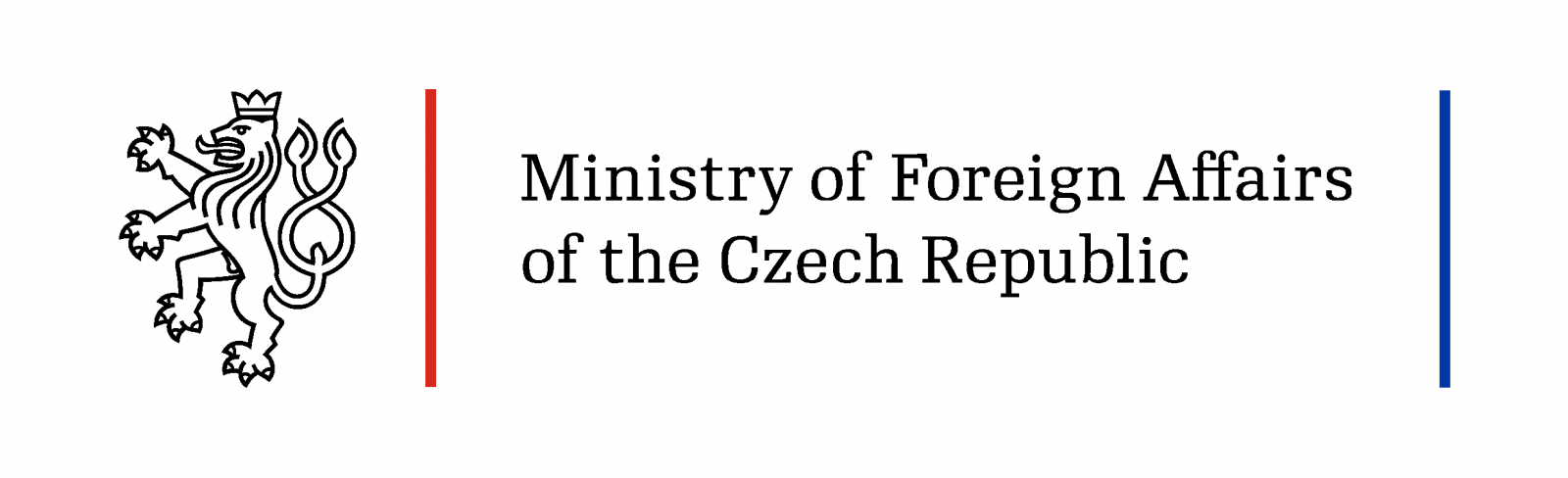

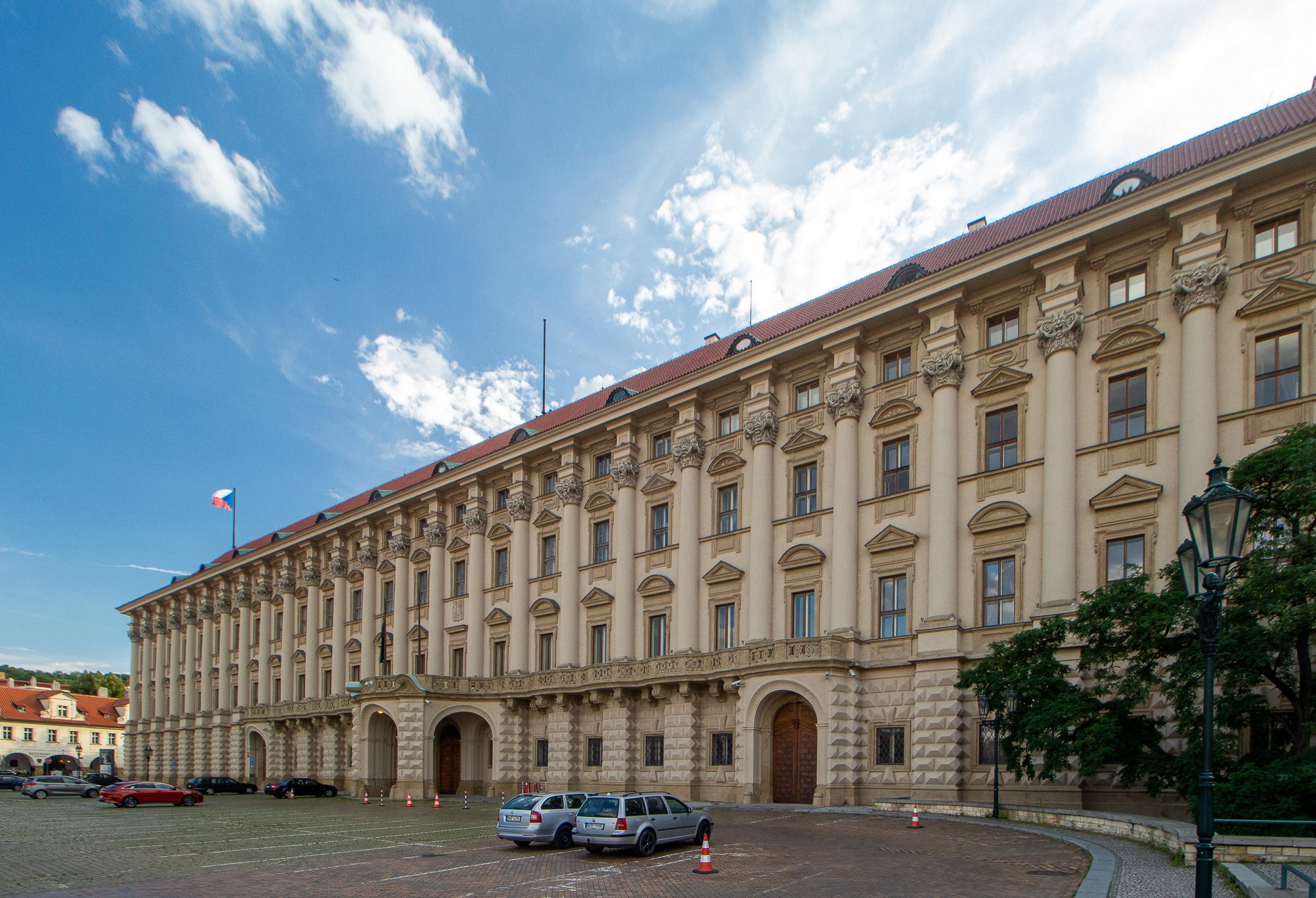

Agency overview
- Formed: 1993
- Jurisdiction: Government of the Czech Republic
- Headquarters: Černín Palace, Loretánské náměstí 5, 118 00 Prague 1 (Hradčany); 50°5′19.56″N 14°23′26.56″E
- Agency executive: Petr Macinka, Minister of Foreign Affairs (List)
- Website: mzv.gov.cz

The Ministry of Foreign Affairs of the Czech Republic (MFACR; Czech: Ministerstvo zahraničních věcí České republiky; MZVČR) is a Czech government ministry responsible for international relations of the Czech Republic.

The Ministry is headquartered in Černín Palace, Loretánské náměstí 5, 118, Prague 1, (Hradčany). The Ministry operates the diplomatic missions of the Czech Republic abroad and is responsible for implementing the foreign policy of the Czech Republic and Czech diplomacy efforts.

The Ministry is led by the Minister of Foreign Affairs, who is nominated by the Prime Minister of the Czech Republic. The current Minister of Foreign Affairs is Petr Macinka, in office since 15 December 2025.

== Tasks and powers of the Ministry ==
The Ministry of Foreign Affairs shall:

1. Coordinate the activities of ministries and other central state administration bodies in the field of foreign relations and the entrusted departments of the state administration.
2. Ensure protection of the rights and interests of the Czech Republic and its citizens abroad.
3. Manage embassies abroad.
4. Perform tasks in ensuring contacts with foreign state authorities in the Czech Republic and abroad.
5. Perform tasks in the administration of assets of the Czech Republic abroad.
6. Coordinate and ensure the preparation, negotiation and national negotiation of international treaties.
7. Secure announcements of international treaties by which the Czech Republic is bound.
8. Monitor compliance and implementation of international treaties and agreements with regard to the application of the foreign policy interests of the Czech Republic
9. Grant consent in cases of import and export of military equipment.
10. Ensures the preparation of employees for the performance of foreign services.
11. Organizationally and technically secure elections to the Chamber of Deputies of the Parliament of the Czech Republic abroad and perform tasks in elections to the European Parliament.

== See also ==
- Foreign relations of the Czech Republic
- Minister of Foreign Affairs of the Czech Republic
