= Orlík Castle =

Castle in Písek, Czech Republic

- Zámek Orlík
- Orlík nad Vltavou, South Bohemian Region in [Czechia]
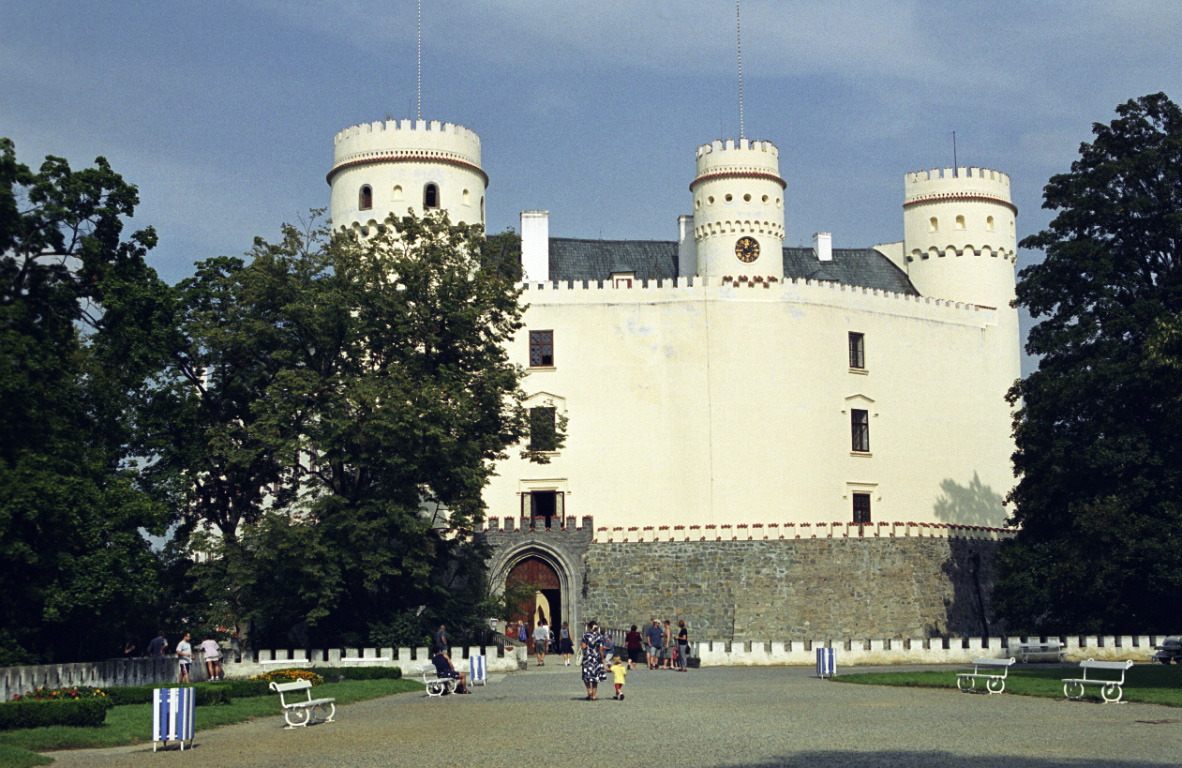

Site information
- Type: Castle
- Owner: House of Schwarzenberg
- Open to the public: Yes
- Website: https://www.zamekorlik.cz/en/

Location
- Location in the Czech Republic
- Coordinates: 49°30′20″N 14°10′02″E

Site history
- Built: 13th-19th centuries

Orlík Castle (Czech: Zámek Orlík) is a château in Orlík nad Vltavou, in Písek District in the South Bohemian Region of the Czech Republic. The original position of the spur castle, on a rock 60 metres (200 ft) above the Vltava valley, was altered by the creation of the Orlík Reservoir in 1954–1962, and the chateâu is now barely a few metres above the water level.

The meaning of the name Orlík stems from the word "young eagle" (Czech: orel). It is often suggested that this castle would have resembled an eagle or nest perched upon the rocky outcrop above a turn in the river.

== History ==
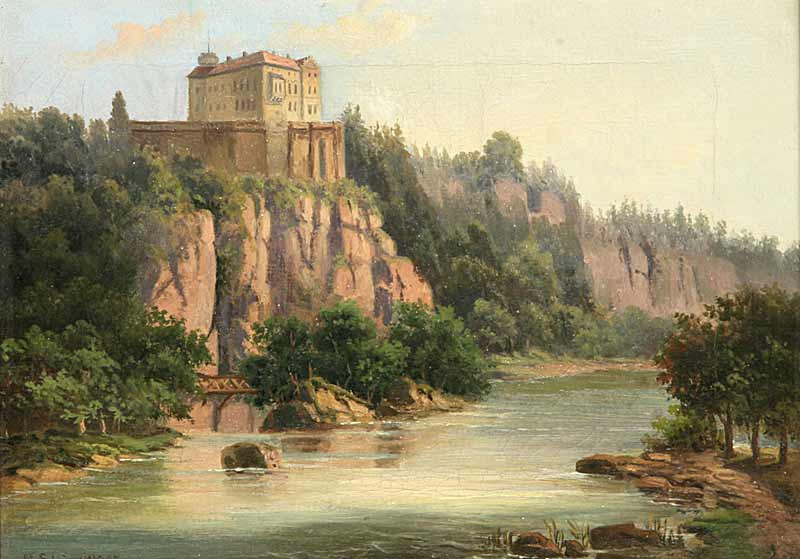
Orlík Chateâu before the building of the Orlík Reservoir. Oil on canvas, by Czech painter Vilém Ströminger.

Orlík was established as a royal castle beside a ford across the Vltava River in the second half of the 13th century, probably by Ottokar II of Bohemia, although in the Middle Ages it came into the hands of noble families and its ownership changed many times. From 1408 the Zmrzlík of Svojšín family owned it, and during their time the Hussite general Jan Žižka stayed in the castle. In 1508 the castle burned down, and was rebuilt as a Renaissance chateâu by the new owners, the Lords of Švamberk. In 1623 the Eggenbergs acquired Orlík, and in 1717 it was inherited by the Schwarzenbergs. At the beginning of the 19th century it became their main residence. In 1802 the chateâu was burned out, and during the subsequent repairs a fourth storey was added to the building. The most famous member of the family was Field Marshal Karl Philipp, Prince of Schwarzenberg, who was victorious over Napoleon in the Battle of Leipzig in 1813. The current Romantic Gothic appearance dates from 1849 to 1860, when partial remodelling in this style was carried out according to plans by Bernard Gruber. The Early Gothic style castle of Orlík was confiscated by the Communist Regime after 1948, but in 1990s was reverted to the Schwarzenbergs.

Access to the chateâu is by a stone bridge across the moat. Three round towers rise above the main façade, one of them being the original, built in the 14th century. The passage into the chateâu is cut into the rock and leads to a trapezoidal courtyard, with arcades on the ground floor. The oldest building is the former palace, which dates from the 14th century and forms the north side of the courtyard.

The interiors are mainly in the Empire style, from the first half of the 19th century. The Lovecký sál (Hunter's Hall), with quadripartite ribbed vaulting, is original Gothic, and the chapel, also dating from the Gothic period, has a net vault. From an artistic point of view, the most valuable rooms are the state rooms on the first floor; the Greater and Lesser Knight's Halls; Hunting Hall; Blue and Empire Saloons; Library, and the Gun Corridor. The interiors are furnished in the style of the period and feature the family's collection of art works.

Adjoining the chateâu is an English-style large park, covering 143 hectares (350 acres), with native and non-native species of trees and shrubs, and a greenhouse with a collection of fuchsias. The Pseudo-Gothic Schwarzenberg vault is in the western part of the park.

The cremated remains of Czech MP Karel Schwarzenberg were buried in the family tomb at Orlík Castle in a private ceremony on 9 December 2023, on what would have been his 86th birthday.

== See also ==
- Zvíkov Castle
