= Karel Schwarzenberg =

Czech politician and noble (1937–2023)

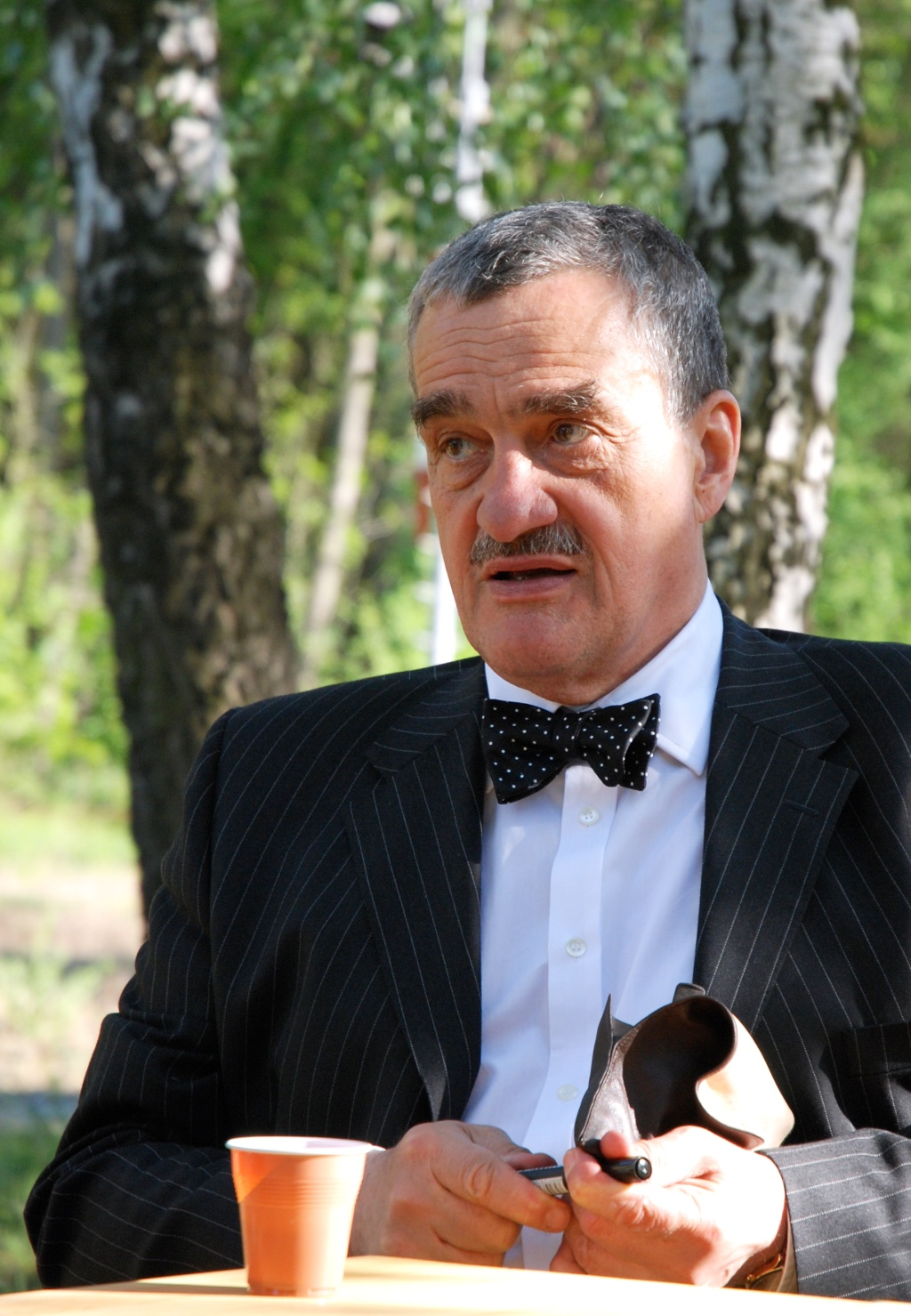
- Schwarzenberg as Minister of Foreign Affairs in 2007

6th & 8th Minister of Foreign Affairs
- In office 13 July 2010 – 10 July 2013
- Prime Minister: Petr Nečas
- Preceded by: Jan Kohout
- Succeeded by: Jan Kohout
- In office 9 January 2007 – 8 May 2009
- Prime Minister: Mirek Topolánek
- Preceded by: Alexandr Vondra
- Succeeded by: Jan Kohout

First Deputy Prime Minister of the Czech Republic
- In office 13 July 2010 – 10 July 2013
- Prime Minister: Petr Nečas
- Preceded by: Vlasta Parkanová
- Succeeded by: Jan Fischer

Leader of TOP 09
- In office 28 November 2009 – 29 November 2015
- Preceded by: Inaugural holder
- Succeeded by: Miroslav Kalousek

Senator from Prague 6
- In office 13 November 2004 – 29 May 2010
- Preceded by: Jan Ruml
- Succeeded by: Petr Bratský

Member of the Chamber of Deputies
- In office 29 May 2010 – 21 October 2021

Personal details
- Born: 10 December 1937 Prague, Czechoslovakia (now Czech Republic)
- Died: 12 November 2023 (aged 85) Vienna, Austria
- Resting place: Orlík Castle, Orlík nad Vltavou, Czech Republic; 49°30′20″N 14°10′02″E
- Citizenship: Czech Republic, Switzerland
- Party: ODA (1996–2007); TOP 09 (2009–2023)
- Spouse: Therese Hardegg (m. 1967)
- Children: Three
- Education: University of Vienna; University of Graz; Ludwig-Maximilians-Universität München (all left prior Graduation)
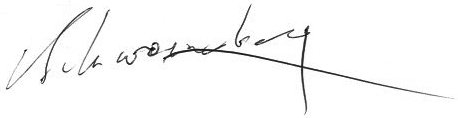
- Signature

Karel Schwarzenberg (Czech pronunciation: [ˈʃvartsn̩bɛrk], 10 December 1937 – 12 November 2023) was a Czech politician, diplomat and statesman who served as the Minister of Foreign Affairs of the Czech Republic from 2007 to 2009 and then again between 2010 and 2013. Schwarzenberg was leader and co-founder of the TOP 09 party and its candidate for president of the Czech Republic in the 2013 election. He served as a member of the Chamber of Deputies (MP) from 2010 to 2021 and in the Senate from 2004 until 2010.

From July 1990 to July 1992 Schwarzenberg served as the chancellor (director of the presidential office) to Václav Havel, while he was president. He went on to be elected as Senator for the municipal district Prague 6 from 2004 to 2010 and to serve as Minister of Foreign Affairs of the Czech Republic from 2007 to 2009 and again from 2010 to 2013, originally as a non-partisan minister nominated by the Green Party. In May 2010, he was elected as a Member of Parliament for the newly founded pro-European centre-right party TOP 09, gaining the largest number of preference votes. He was candidate for President of the Czech Republic in the 2013 presidential election, and qualified for the second round, finishing as runner-up, with 45.19% of the votes. Schwarzenberg was noted for his pro-European views.

Schwarzenberg was the head of the House of Schwarzenberg, a formerly leading family of the Habsburg empire, from 1979 until his death. He was related to Prince Felix of Schwarzenberg, a statesman of the Austrian Empire. From 1948 to 1990, he lived in Austria, where he was known as Karl Schwarzenberg, and was involved in politics for the Austrian People's Party and became a noted critic of human-rights violations in the Eastern Bloc, chairing the International Helsinki Federation for Human Rights. Following the fall of communism, he became a close adviser to Václav Havel and relocated to Prague.

Schwarzenberg was married to Countess Therese von Hardegg (Therese Gräfin zu Hardegg auf Glatz und im Machlande) and they had three children, all of whom live in Austria.

== Background, education and personal life ==
The House of Schwarzenberg originates in Franconia, where the family still owns substantial property, but made Bohemia their primary seat in the 17th century, also maintaining residences in Vienna. The family had possessed fiefdoms in Bohemia as far back as the Middle Ages; it was one of the richest noble families of Bohemia and Austria-Hungary, and one of the largest land owners of Bohemia.

Karel Schwarzenberg was the eldest son of Prince Karel VI of Schwarzenberg of the junior line (Second Majorat of the House of Schwarzenberg), and his wife, Princess Antonie von Fürstenberg. He was the 1,322nd Knight of the Order of the Golden Fleece of Austria. He was first cousin of Princess Ira and Prince Egon von Fürstenberg and second cousin of Rainier III, Prince of Monaco. By tradition, he held the style of Serene Highness (German: Durchlaucht).

Schwarzenberg was born in Prague and his family spoke both German and Czech. He was known for his "slightly archaic and often earthy Czech." Schwarzenberg and his parents had to leave the country after the Communist coup of 1948, and emigrated to Austria, with Swiss citizenship. He studied law and forestry at the University of Vienna, the Ludwig-Maximilians-Universität München and the University of Graz, but left studies prior to graduation. He had two sisters, Marie Eleonore von Bredow (born 1936) and Dr. Anna Maria Freiin von Haxthausen (born 1946), and one brother, Dr. rer. oec. Friedrich Prinz zu Schwarzenberg (born 1940).

On 22 April 1967, in Seefeld, Schwarzenberg married Countess Therese zu Hardegg (b. Vienna, 17 February 1940). The marriage ended in divorce in 1988. The couple married for a second time on 25 July 2008. His wife spends most of her time in Vienna and does not speak Czech.

- Prince Johannes Nepomucenus Andreas Heinrich Joseph Karl Ferdinand Johannes Evangelist die Heiligen Drei Könige Achaz Michael Maria, Prince of Schwarzenberg (b. 13 December 1967) married firstly to Diana Orgovanyi-Hanstein (granddaughter of Baroness Maximiliane von Berg) on 20 March 2010. The couple divorced 7 years later and Johannes married Donna Francesca Riario-Sforza, the daughter of Duke of San Paolo, on 8 April 2017.
- Princess Anna Carolina Antoinette Elisabeth Theresia Olga Adelheid Maria of Schwarzenberg (b. 16 December 1968). She married Peter Morgan on 28 July 1997 (civilly) and on 6 September 1997 (religiously). They have five children:
  - Gioia Maria Morgan (1999)
  - Robin Leopold Morgan (2001)
  - Karol Benjamin Morgan (2004)
  - Mr. Morgan (2006)
  - Lászlo Morgan (2011)
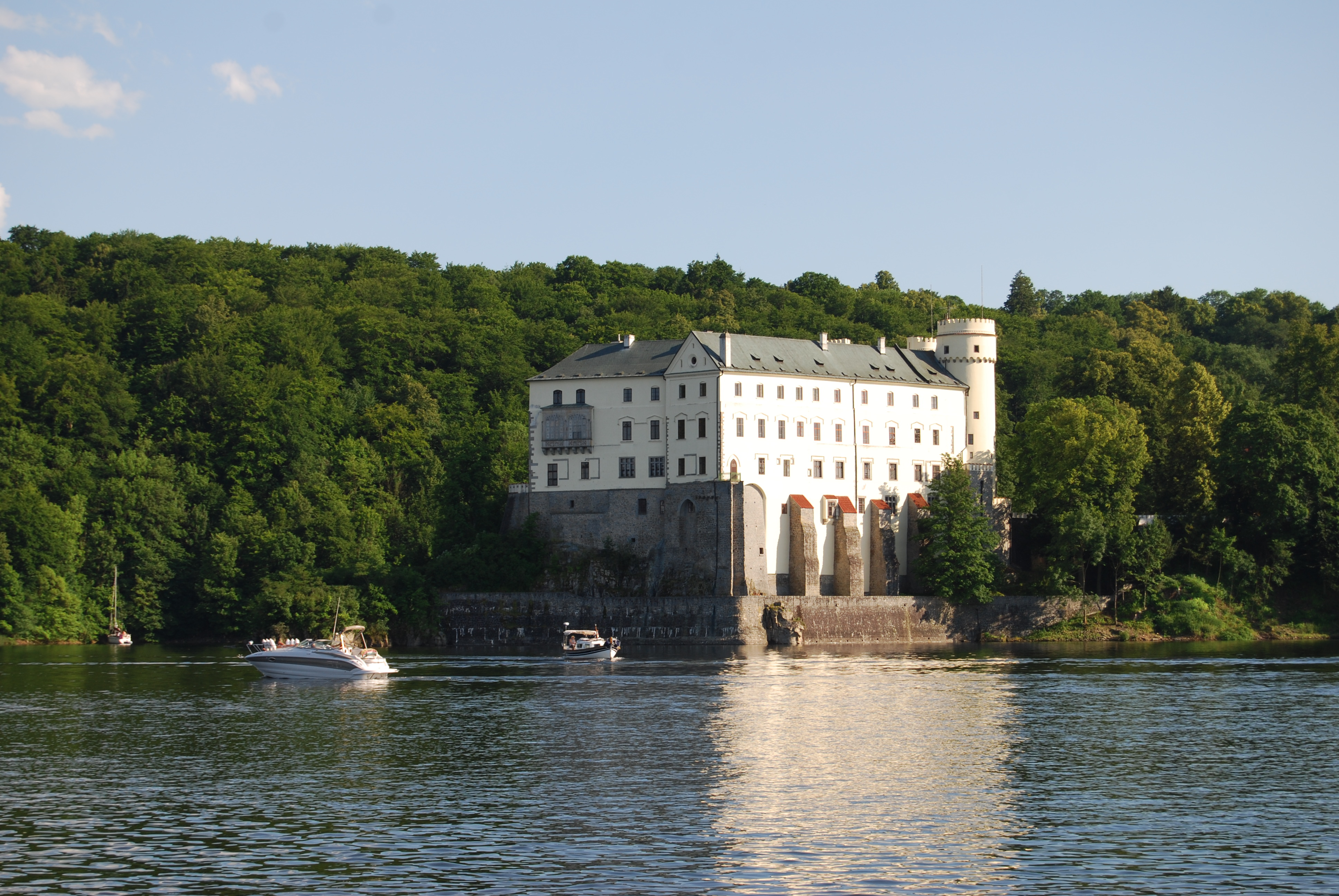
- Orlík Castle in South Bohemia, since 1802 the seat of the Karel Schwarzenberg family Dřevíč Castle in Central Bohemia, the personal residence of Karel Schwarzenberg
  Prince Karl Philipp Ernst Ferdinand Alwig Kilian of Schwarzenberg (12 May 1979) adopted by Austrian industrialist and politician Thomas Prinzhorn by agreement 25 November 1987. He married Countess Anna Elisabeth Aline Henriette Maria Benedikta Stephanie Johanna Lidvine Walpurga Thekla von und zu Eltz genannt Faust von Stromberg on 3 October 2009.

After the fall of the communist regime, Schwarzenberg returned to Prague in 1990, although he still occasionally visited Austria, where part of his family lives. He held both Swiss and Czech citizenship.

Schwarzenberg was the second Czech Patron of The English College in Prague, succeeding the founding Patron Vaclav Havel after the latter's death. He was joint patron with King Charles.

Schwarzenberg's daughter (conventionally known as Lila Morgan-Schwarzenberg) co-directed and co-wrote a documentary about her father and their strained relationship ("Mein Vater der Fürst") which was released in 2022.

== Exile, human-rights activism and career in Austrian politics ==
In the 1960s, Schwarzenberg was active in the conservative Austrian People's Party and contributed to reforming the party before the 1966 legislative election. Voices inside the party considered him a possible candidate for the position of Foreign Minister of Austria, the position he would occupy in the Czech Republic decades later.

Schwarzenberg soon became active in the resistance against the communist dictatorship in Czechoslovakia and became a prominent human-rights advocate, and a leading voice against the communist rule of his native country after the Prague Spring. From 1984 to 1991 he was chairman of the International Helsinki Federation for Human Rights, and in 1986 he founded the Dokumentationszentrum zur Förderung der unabhängigen tschechoslowakischen Literatur in Scheinfeld, West Germany. In 1989, he accepted the European Human Rights Prize on behalf of the International Helsinki Federation for Human Rights.

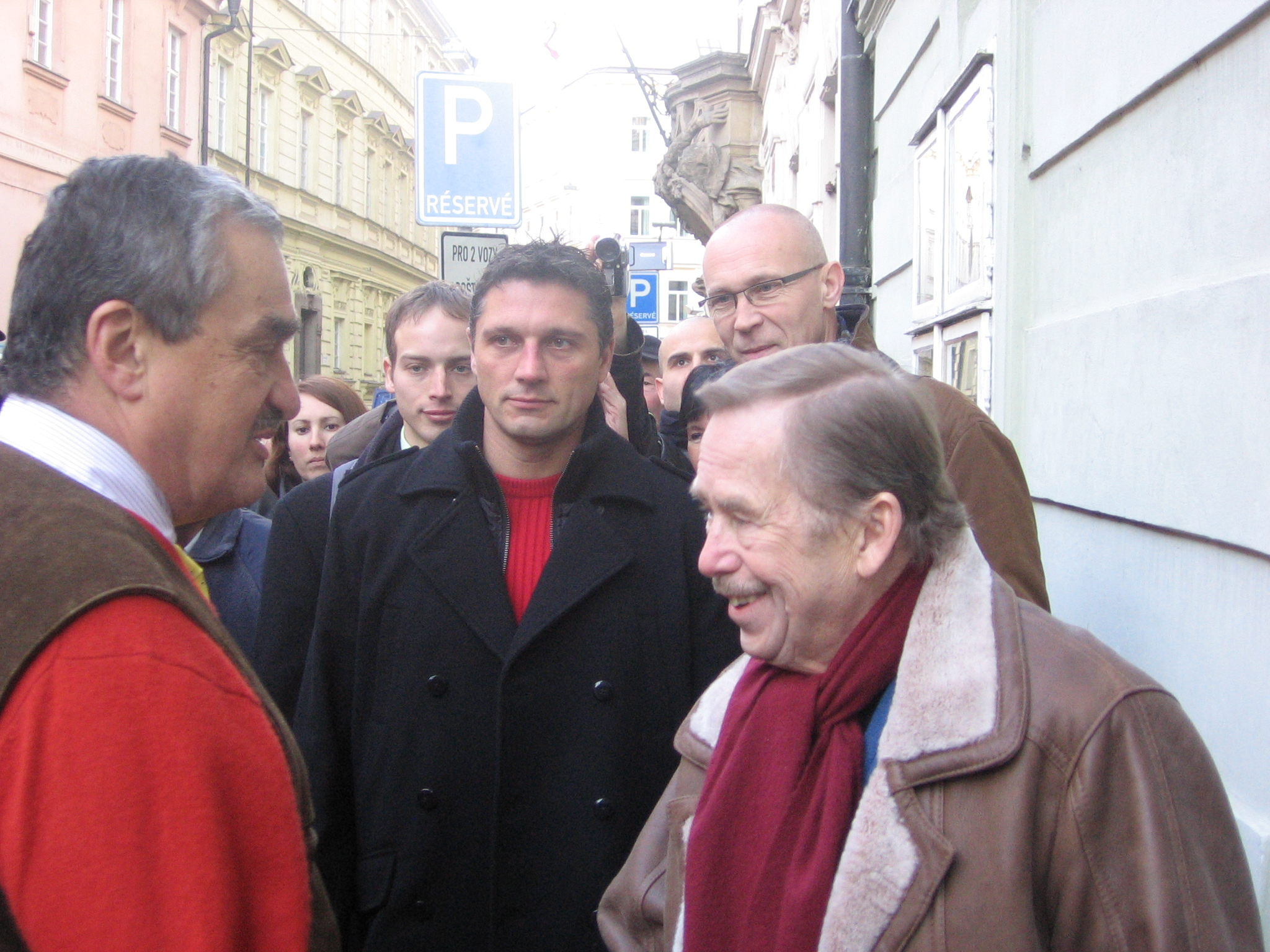
Karel Schwarzenberg and Czech ex-president Václav Havel, 2008

== Career in Czech politics ==
A long-time friend and close collaborator of Václav Havel, he served for two years as Havel's chancellor (from July 1990 to July 1992) during Havel's tenure as president.

=== Senator ===
Schwarzenberg was elected as a Senator in the Czech Senate from the 6th District of Prague on 13 November 2004, having been nominated by the Freedom Union – Democratic Union (US-DEU) and Civic Democratic Alliance (ODA) parties, and served until 29 May 2010.

While a senator, he was expelled from Cuba in May 2005 (together with German MP Arnold Vaatz), where he was due to meet dissidents opposed to the Cuban President Fidel Castro.

=== Foreign Minister of the Czech Republic ===
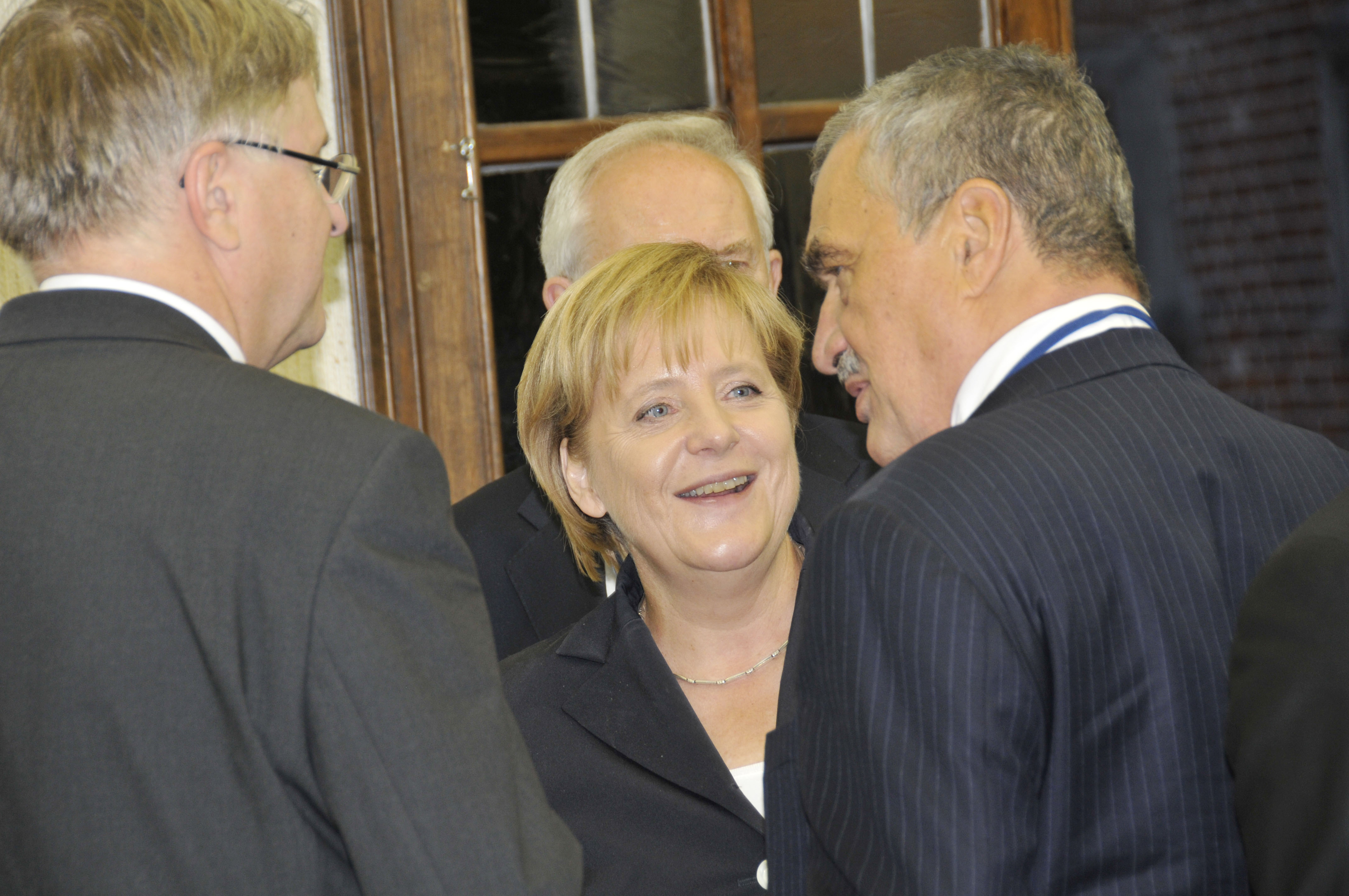
Schwarzenberg with German Chancellor Angela Merkel, 2010

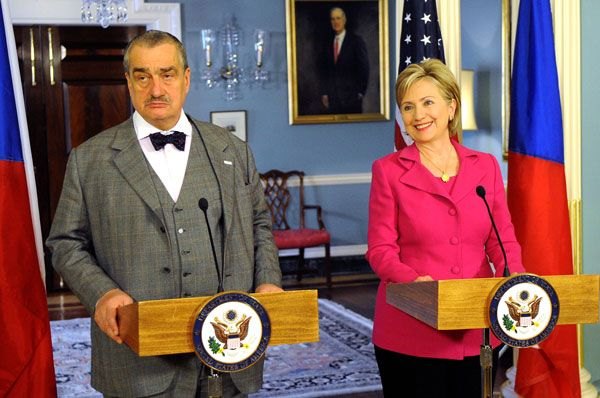
Schwarzenberg and US Secretary of State Hillary Clinton at a press conference

Between 9 January 2007 and 9 May 2009, he was Minister of Foreign Affairs of the Czech Republic in Mirek Topolánek's second coalition government. His nomination by the Green Party caused a small controversy when President Václav Klaus stated that he had strong links to Austria and so would not be able to defend national interests. On 8 July 2008, he and the American Secretary of State Condoleezza Rice signed an agreement on the United States's Missile shield program.

According to public opinion polls, he was the most popular politician in the Czech Republic in 2009, and he also usually received the most preferential votes in elections.

In the first half of 2009, Schwarzenberg was also the Council President (Responsible national minister) of the European Union. Also in 2009, he and coalition colleague Miroslav Kalousek formed a new Czech political party TOP 09, which they led to success in the general elections of 2010, gaining 16% of the vote and representation in the Czech Parliament.

Schwarzenberg left office as Foreign Minister on 8 May 2009. He became Foreign Minister once again on 13 July 2010; he held the post until 10 July 2013.

=== Candidate for President of the Czech Republic ===
On 11–12 January 2013, Schwarzenberg successfully took part in the first round of Czech presidential elections, the first popular vote for presidency of the country. With 23.40% of the total vote, he finished second behind former prime minister Miloš Zeman (24.21%). In the second-round run-off between the two men, held on 25–26 January 2013, Schwarzenberg received 45.19% of the vote and thus lost to Zeman.

=== Member of parliament ===
From 2010 to 2021, he was a member of the Chamber of Deputies of the Parliament of the Czech Republic for TOP 09. In the 2013 - 2017 election period, he was the chairman of the Foreign Affairs Committee of the Chamber of Deputies of the Parliament of the Czech Republic. In 2021, he announced that he would no longer defend his mandate in the upcoming elections due to his deteriorating health.

=== After retiring from active politics ===
Schwarzenberg continued to comment on public events, usually in the form of comments in the media, interviews or debates. After Petr Pavel was elected president of the Czech Republic in 2023, he became one of his advisors for foreign policy and internal policy.

== Illness and death ==
Schwarzenberg was hospitalised in Prague in August 2023 with heart and kidney problems and was later flown to a clinic in Vienna. He died there on 12 November 2023, at the age of 85.

== Political positions ==
=== Position on communist crimes ===
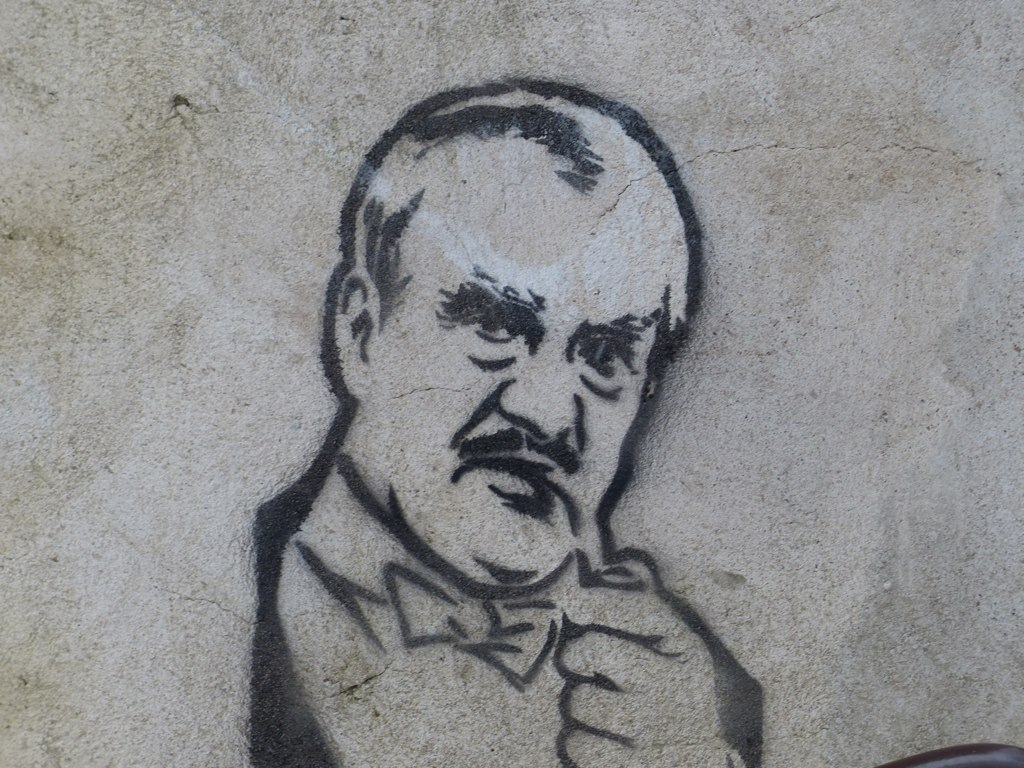
Karel Schwarzenberg on graffiti in Prague (2013)

In December 2010, Schwarzenberg, along with the foreign ministers of five other Central and Eastern European EU countries, called upon the European Commission to make "the approval, denial or belittling of communist crimes" an EU-wide criminal offence. Schwarzenberg said that the denial of the crimes of communism is analogous to denying the crimes of Nazism, which in many EU countries is a criminal offense, arguing that "there is a fundamental concern here that totalitarian systems be measured by the same standard."

=== Condemnation of the Beneš decrees ===
In January 2013, while running for President of the Czech Republic, Schwarzenberg stated, referring to the Beneš decrees, that "what we committed in 1945 would today be considered a grave violation of human rights and the Czechoslovak government, along with President Beneš, would have found themselves in The Hague," referring to the International Criminal Court. The decrees led to the expulsion of many Germans and Hungarians from Czechoslovakia by the Czechoslovak government of Edvard Beneš.

=== Israel ===
In 2008, Schwarzenberg expressed support for Israel's right to defend itself during the Gaza–Israel conflict.

== Titles, names and awards ==
=== Titles and names ===
Coat of arms of the Schwarzenberg family

A member of the high nobility of Bohemia, his full name was Karl Johannes Nepomuk Josef Norbert Friedrich Antonius Wratislaw Mena Fürst zu Schwarzenberg in German and Karel Jan Nepomuk Josef Norbert Bedřich Antonín Vratislav Menas kníže ze Schwarzenberga in Czech. He was generally known as Karl zu Schwarzenberg in German and used the Czech form of his first name, Karel, in Czech.

Karel Schwarzenberg was the 12th Prince of Schwarzenberg, through his adoption by Heinrich Schwarzenberg, the brother of Joseph Schwarzenberg, the 11th Prince and last male member of the major Schwarzenberg line (First Majorat). Although Heinrich died before his brother Joseph III (the 11th Prince), the adoption allowed Karel Schwarzenberg to succeed to the major Schwarzenberg line. Thus, in his person the minor line (Second Majorat), of which he was part by origin, has been united with the major line.

In the Czech Republic, using of noble predicates is prohibited by law No. 61/1918 Sb. In Austria, noble predicates have been illegal since 1919 (i.e. nearly 20 years before his birth). If Schwarzenberg had used his titles, his name and style would have been:

- His Serene Highness The Prince of Schwarzenberg, Count of Sulz, Princely Landgrave in Klettgau, and Duke of Krumlov.

=== Awards ===
- In 1989, he received together with Lech Wałęsa, later president of Poland, the Council of Europe Human Rights Prize.
- In 1991, he received the Order of the Golden Fleece (Austrian branch).
- In 2003, he received the Order of Tomáš Garrigue Masaryk 3rd Class of the Czech Republic.
- In 2005, he received the Decoration for Services to the Republic of Austria in Silver with Sash.
- In 2008, he received the Grand Cross of the Federal Cross of Merit – Bundesverdienstkreuz – of the Federal Republic of Germany.
- In 2010, he received the Bene Merito honorary badge from the Republic of Poland
- In 2012, he received the Order of Merit of the Free State of Saxony – Sächsischer Verdienstorden – in Dresden, Saxony.
- In 2015, he received the Marietta and Friedrich Torberg Medal.
- In 2021, he received the Order of Prince Yaroslav the Wise from Ukraine.
- In 2023, he received the Order of the White Lion.

Schwarzenberg was also a regular attendant to the Trilateral Commission and the Bilderberg meetings.

== Ancestry ==
Ancestors of Karel Schwarzenberg

16. Karl III, Prince of Schwarzenberg
8. Karl IV, Prince of Schwarzenberg
17. Princess Wilhelmine of Oettingen-Oettingen and Oettingen-Wallerstein
4. Karl V, Prince of Schwarzenberg
18. Count Frederick Charles Kinsky of Wchinitz and Tettau
9. Countess Maria Theresa Kinsky of Wchinitz and Tettau
19. Countess Sophie of Mensdorff-Pouilly
2. Karl VI, Prince of Schwarzenberg
20. Count Eduard Clam-Gallas
10. Count Francis of Clam and Gallas
21. Countess Clothilde of Dietrichstein-Proskau and Leslie
5. Countess Eleanor of Clam and Gallas
22. Count Ernest Karl of Hoyos-Sprinzenstein
11. Countess Maria of Hoyos-Sprinzenstein
23. Countess Eleonore von Paar
1. Karl Johannes, Prince of Schwarzenberg
24. Charles Egon II, Prince of Fürstenberg
12. Maximilian Egon I, Prince of Fürstenberg
25. Princess Amalie Christine of Baden
6. Prince Charles Emil of Fürstenberg
26. Richard, 5th Prince of Khevenhüller-Metsch
13. Countess Leontina Antonie of Khevenhüller-Metsch
27. Countess Antonia von Lichnowsky von Woschütz
3. Princess Antonie Leontina of Fürstenberg
28. Count György Festetics de Tolna
14. Tassilo, 1st Prince Festetics de Tolna
29. Countess Eugénia Erdődy de Monyorókerék et Monoszló
7. Countess Maria Matilda Festetics de Tolna
30. William Hamilton, 11th Duke of Hamilton
15. Lady Mary Victoria Douglas-Hamilton
31. Princess Marie of Baden

== See also ==
- Palais Schwarzenberg
- Orlík nad Vltavou
- House of Schwarzenberg

Karel Schwarzenberg House of Schwarzenberg Cadet branch of the House of Seinsheim Born: 10 December 1937 Died: 11 November 2023
Titles in pretence
| Preceded by Joseph III | — TITULAR — 17th Duke of Krumlov; 1979–2023 | Succeeded by Johann Nepomuk |
| Preceded by Joseph III | — TITULAR — 12th Prince of Schwarzenberg (primogeniture); 1979–2023 | Succeeded by Johann Nepomuk |
| Preceded by Charles VI | — TITULAR — 7th Prince of Schwarzenberg (secundogeniture); 1986–2023 | Succeeded by Johann Nepomuk |
Assembly seats
| Preceded by Jan Ruml | Senator from the 6th District of Prague; 2004–2010 | Succeeded by Petr Bratský |
Political offices
| Preceded by Alexandr Vondra | Minister of Foreign Affairs; 2007–2009 | Succeeded by Jan Kohout |
| Preceded by Bernard Kouchner | President of the Council of the European Union; 2009 | Succeeded by Jan Kohout |
| Preceded by Jan Kohout | Minister of Foreign Affairs; 2010–2013 | Succeeded by Jan Kohout |
