= Minister of Foreign Affairs (Czech Republic) =

Minister of Foreign Affairs in Czech Republic

Minister of Foreign Affairs of the Czech Republic Ministr zahraničních věcí České republiky
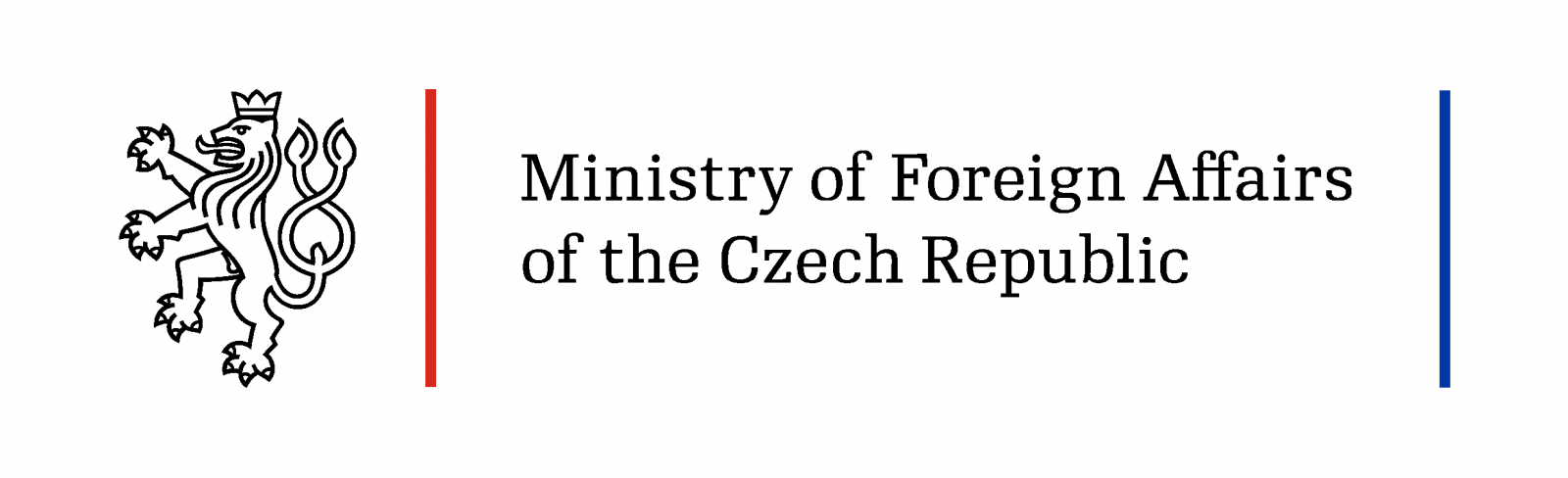

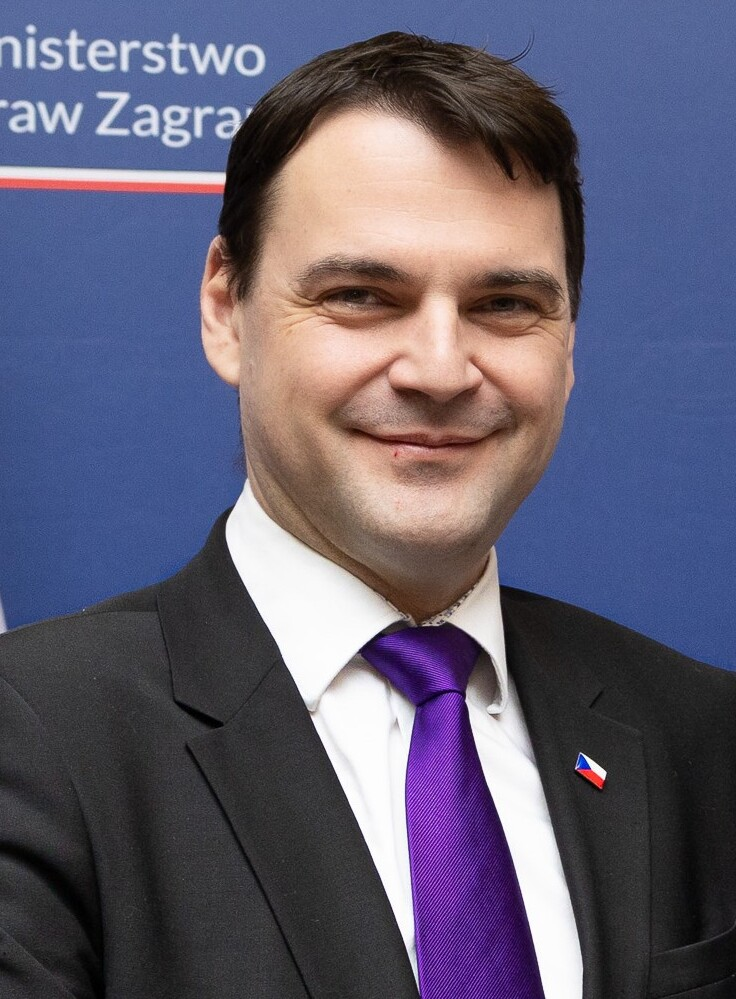
- Incumbent; Petr Macinka since 15 December 2025
- Seat: Czernin Palace
- Nominator: Prime Minister
- Appointer: President
- Inaugural holder: Josef Zieleniec
- Formation: 1 January 1993
- Website: www.mzv.cz

The minister of foreign affairs of the Czech Republic (Czech: Ministr zahraničních věcí České republiky) is a senior official of the Government of the Czech Republic, and as the head of the Ministry of Foreign Affairs is concerned with foreign policy and foreign relations of the Czech Republic.

The minister of foreign affairs is appointed by the president after being nominated by the prime minister.

The minister of foreign affairs along with the finance minister, the minister of defence, and the minister of the interior are generally regarded as the four most important cabinet members because of the importance of their respective ministries.

The current minister of foreign affairs of the Czech Republic is Petr Macinka.

== List of ministers of foreign affairs of the Czech Republic ==
Name	Portrait	Entered office	Left office	Political party
Josef Zieleniec		1 January 1993	23 October 1997	ODS
Jaroslav Šedivý		8 November 1997	17 July 1998	Independent
Jan Kavan		22 July 1998	12 July 2002	ČSSD
Cyril Svoboda		15 July 2002	4 September 2006	KDU-ČSL
Alexandr Vondra		4 September 2006	9 January 2007	ODS
Karel Schwarzenberg		9 January 2007	8 May 2009	Greens
Jan Kohout		8 May 2009	13 July 2010	Independent
Karel Schwarzenberg		13 July 2010	10 July 2013	TOP 09
Jan Kohout		10 July 2013	29 January 2014	Independent
Lubomír Zaorálek		29 January 2014	13 December 2017	ČSSD
Martin Stropnický		13 December 2017	27 June 2018	ANO
Jan Hamáček (acting)		27 June 2018	16 October 2018	ČSSD
Tomáš Petříček		16 October 2018	12 April 2021	ČSSD
Jan Hamáček (acting)		12 April 2021	21 April 2021	ČSSD
Jakub Kulhánek		21 April 2021	17 December 2021	ČSSD
Jan Lipavský		17 December 2021	15 December 2025	Pirates
Petr Macinka		15 December 2025	Incumbent	AUTO

== See also ==
- Ministry of Foreign Affairs (Czech Republic)
