= Brzánky =

- Municipality
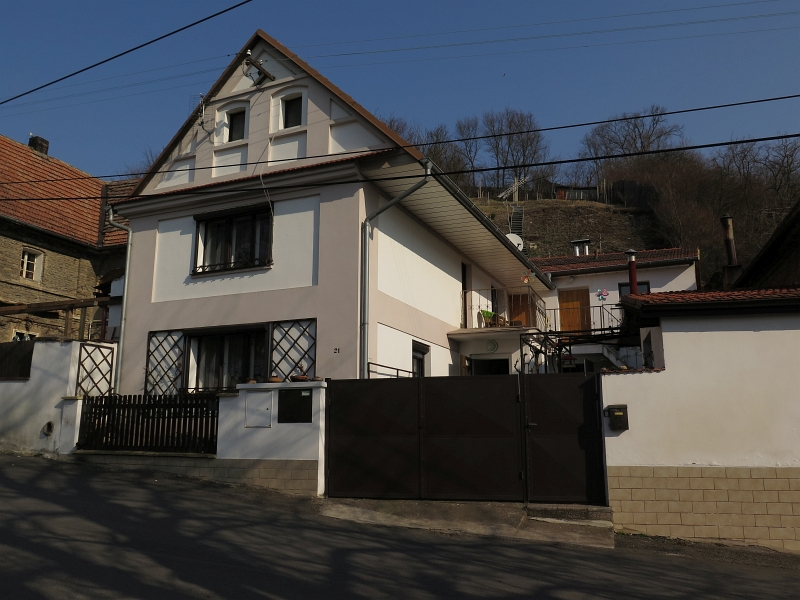
- House No. 21

- Location in the Czech Republic
- Coordinates: 50°27′43″N 14°18′5″E
- Country: Czech Republic
- Region: Ústí nad Labem
- District: Litoměřice
- First mentioned: 1338

Area
  - Total: 2.16 km^{2} (0.83 sq mi)
- Elevation: 165 m (541 ft)

Population (2026-01-01)
  - Total: 90
  - Density: 42/km^{2} (110/sq mi)
- Time zone: UTC+1 (CET)
  - Summer (DST): UTC+2 (CEST)
- Postal code: 413 01
- Website: www.brzanky.cz

Brzánky is a municipality and village in Litoměřice District in the Ústí nad Labem Region of the Czech Republic. It has about 90 inhabitants.

Brzánky lies approximately 16 kilometres (10 mi) south-east of Litoměřice, 29 km (18 mi) south-east of Ústí nad Labem, and 43 km (27 mi) north of Prague.

== Demographics ==
Historical population
Year	Pop.	±%
1869	202	—
1880	205	+1.5%
1890	246	+20.0%
1900	252	+2.4%
1910	281	+11.5%
1921	268	−4.6%
1930	220	−17.9%
1950	166	−24.5%
1961	182	+9.6%
1970	135	−25.8%
1980	111	−17.8%
1991	75	−32.4%
2001	83	+10.7%
2011	90	+8.4%
2021	89	−1.1%
Source: Censuses
