= Nové Dvory (Litoměřice District) =

- Municipality
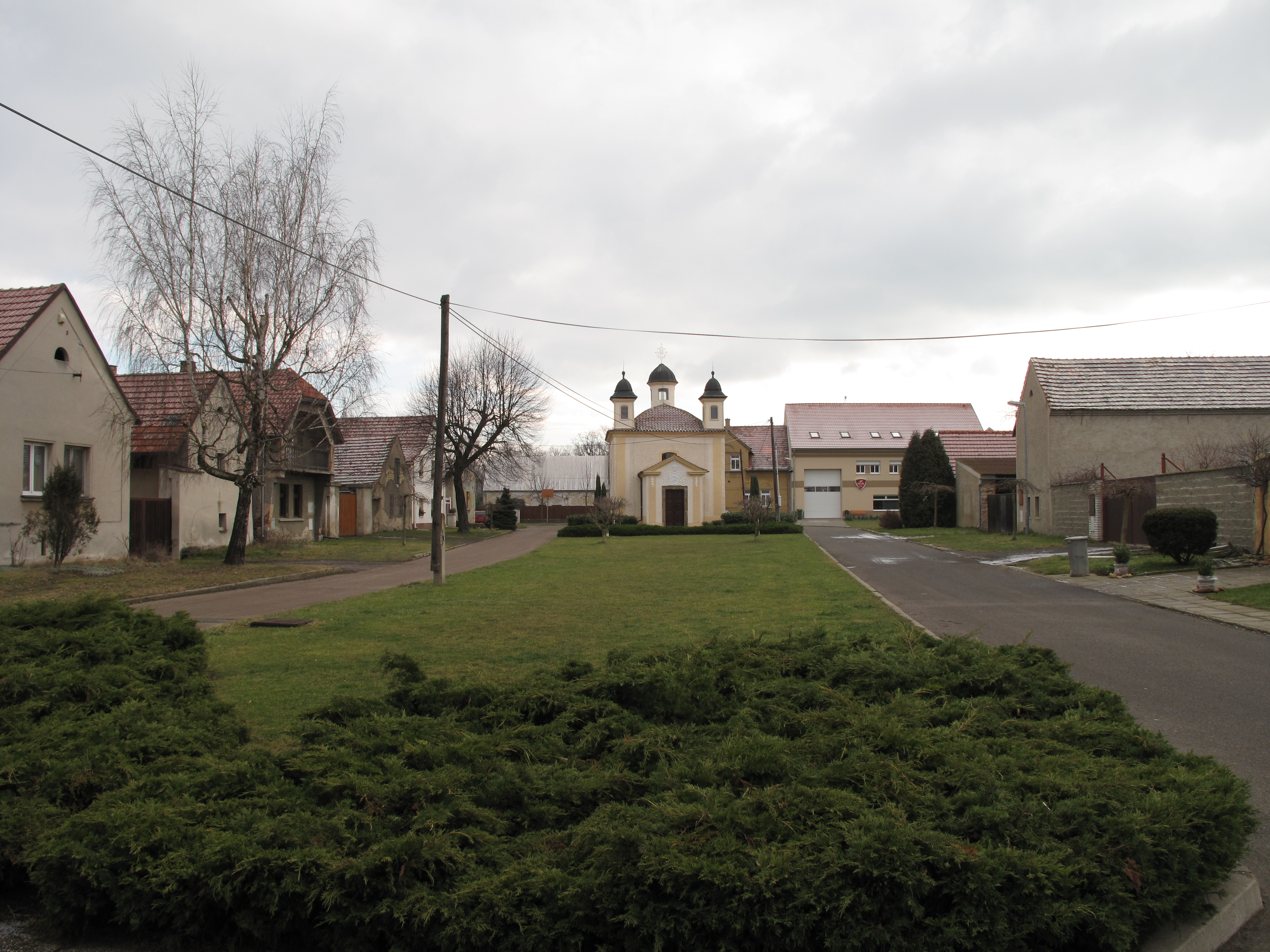
- Chvalín, a part of Nové Dvory

- Location in the Czech Republic
- Coordinates: 50°26′52″N 14°10′46″E
- Country: Czech Republic
- Region: Ústí nad Labem
- District: Litoměřice
- First mentioned: 1451

Area
  - Total: 7.23 km^{2} (2.79 sq mi)
- Elevation: 159 m (522 ft)

Population (2026-01-01)
  - Total: 388
  - Density: 53.7/km^{2} (139/sq mi)
- Time zone: UTC+1 (CET)
  - Summer (DST): UTC+2 (CEST)
- Postal code: 413 01
- Website: www.nove-dvory.cz

Nové Dvory is a municipality and village in Litoměřice District in the Ústí nad Labem Region of the Czech Republic. It has about 400 inhabitants.

Nové Dvory lies approximately 11 kilometres (7 mi) south-east of Litoměřice, 26 km (16 mi) south-east of Ústí nad Labem, and 44 km (27 mi) north-west of Prague.

== Administrative division ==
Nové Dvory consists of two municipal parts (in brackets population according to the 2021 census):

- Nové Dvory (229)
- Chvalín (166)

== Demographics ==
Historical population
Year	Pop.	±%
1869	461	—
1880	541	+17.4%
1890	502	−7.2%
1900	553	+10.2%
1910	621	+12.3%
1921	646	+4.0%
1930	624	−3.4%
1950	509	−18.4%
1961	425	−16.5%
1970	437	+2.8%
1980	397	−9.2%
1991	347	−12.6%
2001	350	+0.9%
2011	393	+12.3%
2021	395	+0.5%
Source: Censuses
