= Chodouny =

- Municipality
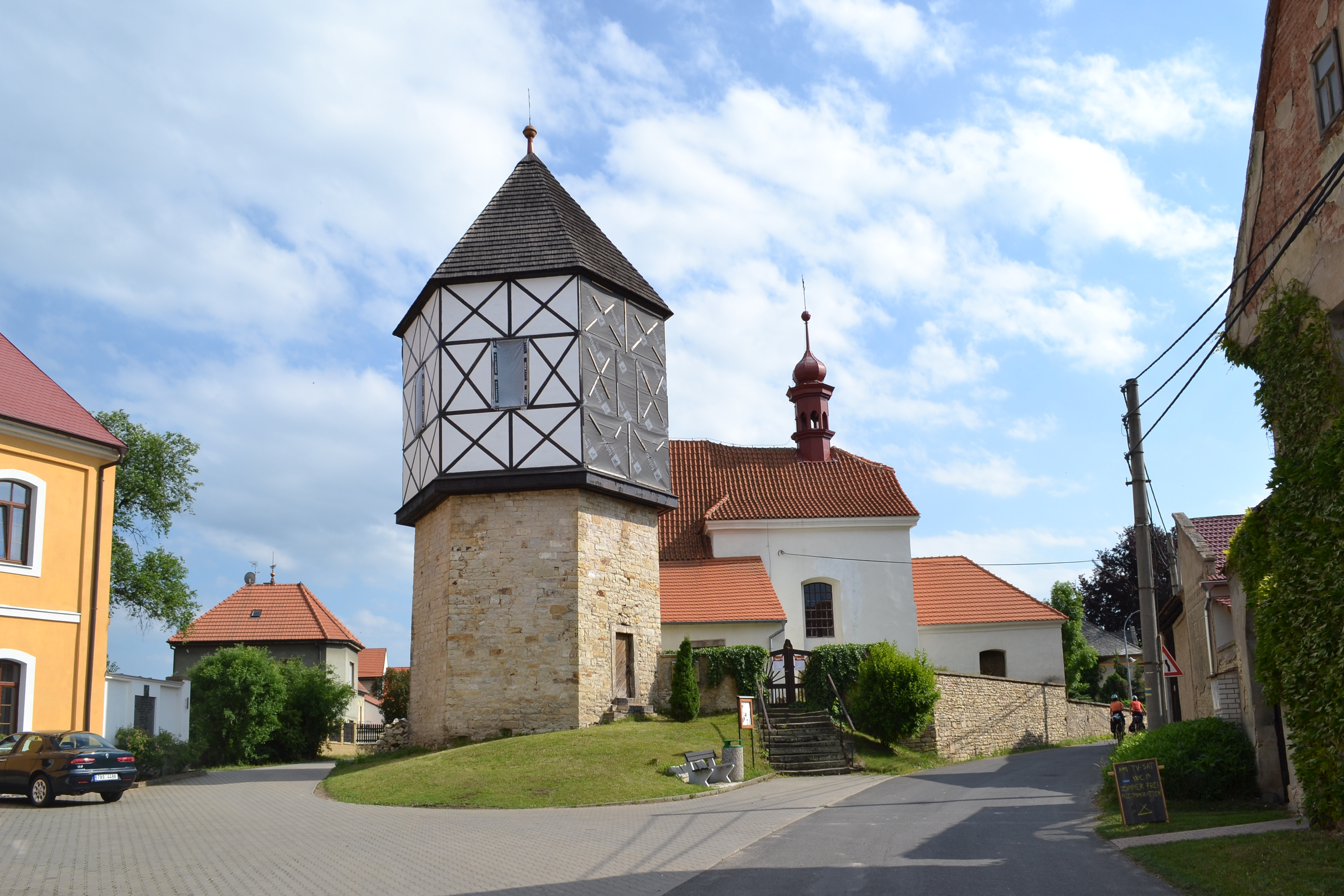
- Belfry and Church of Saint Nicholas in Lounky

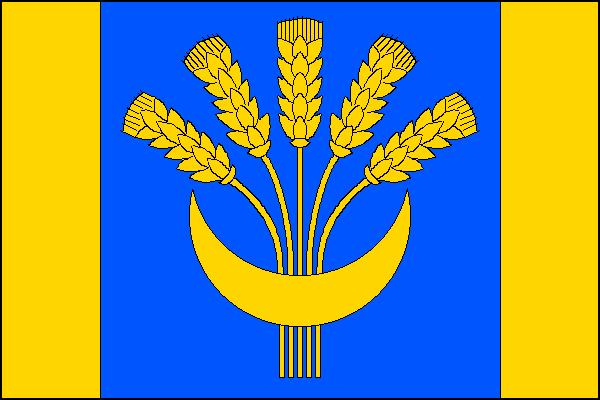
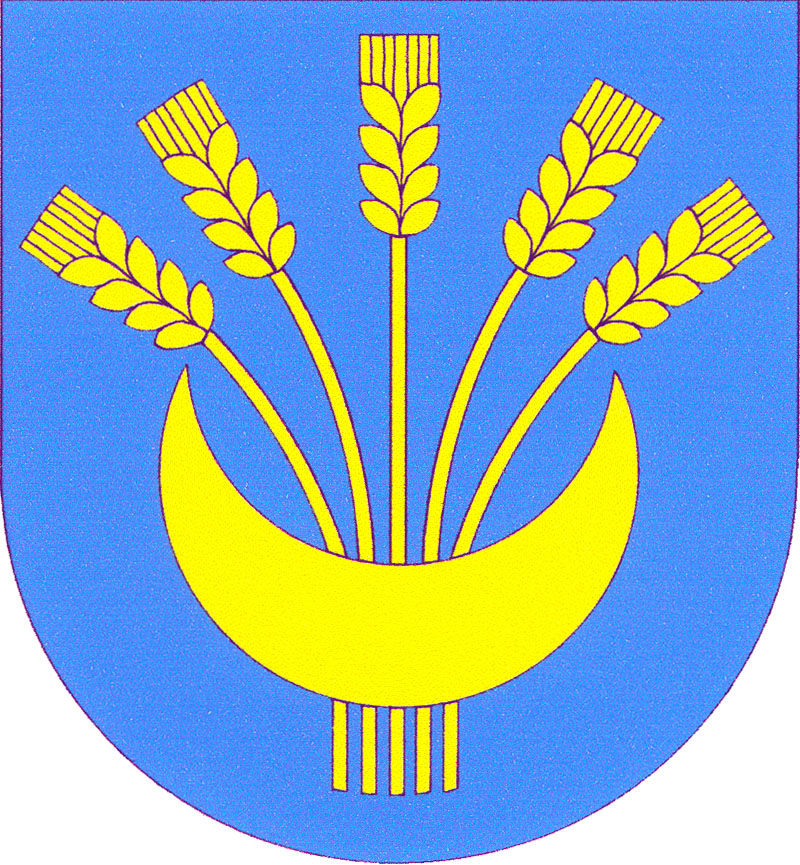
- Flag Coat of arms

- Location in the Czech Republic
- Coordinates: 50°28′24″N 14°15′2″E
- Country: Czech Republic
- Region: Ústí nad Labem
- District: Litoměřice
- First mentioned: 1226

Area
  - Total: 10.02 km^{2} (3.87 sq mi)
- Elevation: 154 m (505 ft)

Population (2026-01-01)
  - Total: 715
  - Density: 71.4/km^{2} (185/sq mi)
- Time zone: UTC+1 (CET)
  - Summer (DST): UTC+2 (CEST)
- Postal codes: 411 71, 413 01
- Website: www.obecchodouny.cz

Chodouny is a municipality and village in Litoměřice District in the Ústí nad Labem Region of the Czech Republic. It has about 700 inhabitants.

Chodouny lies approximately 12 kilometres (7 mi) south-east of Litoměřice, 26 km (16 mi) south-east of Ústí nad Labem, and 45 km (28 mi) north of Prague.

== Administrative division ==
Chodouny consists of two municipal parts (in brackets population according to the 2021 census):

- Chodouny (348)
- Lounky (322)

== Demographics ==
Historical population
Year	Pop.	±%
1869	758	—
1880	855	+12.8%
1890	922	+7.8%
1900	1,031	+11.8%
1910	1,055	+2.3%
1921	1,108	+5.0%
1930	1,040	−6.1%
1950	675	−35.1%
1961	746	+10.5%
1970	668	−10.5%
1980	663	−0.7%
1991	595	−10.3%
2001	595	+0.0%
2011	610	+2.5%
2021	670	+9.8%
Source: Censuses
