= Horní Řepčice =

- Municipality
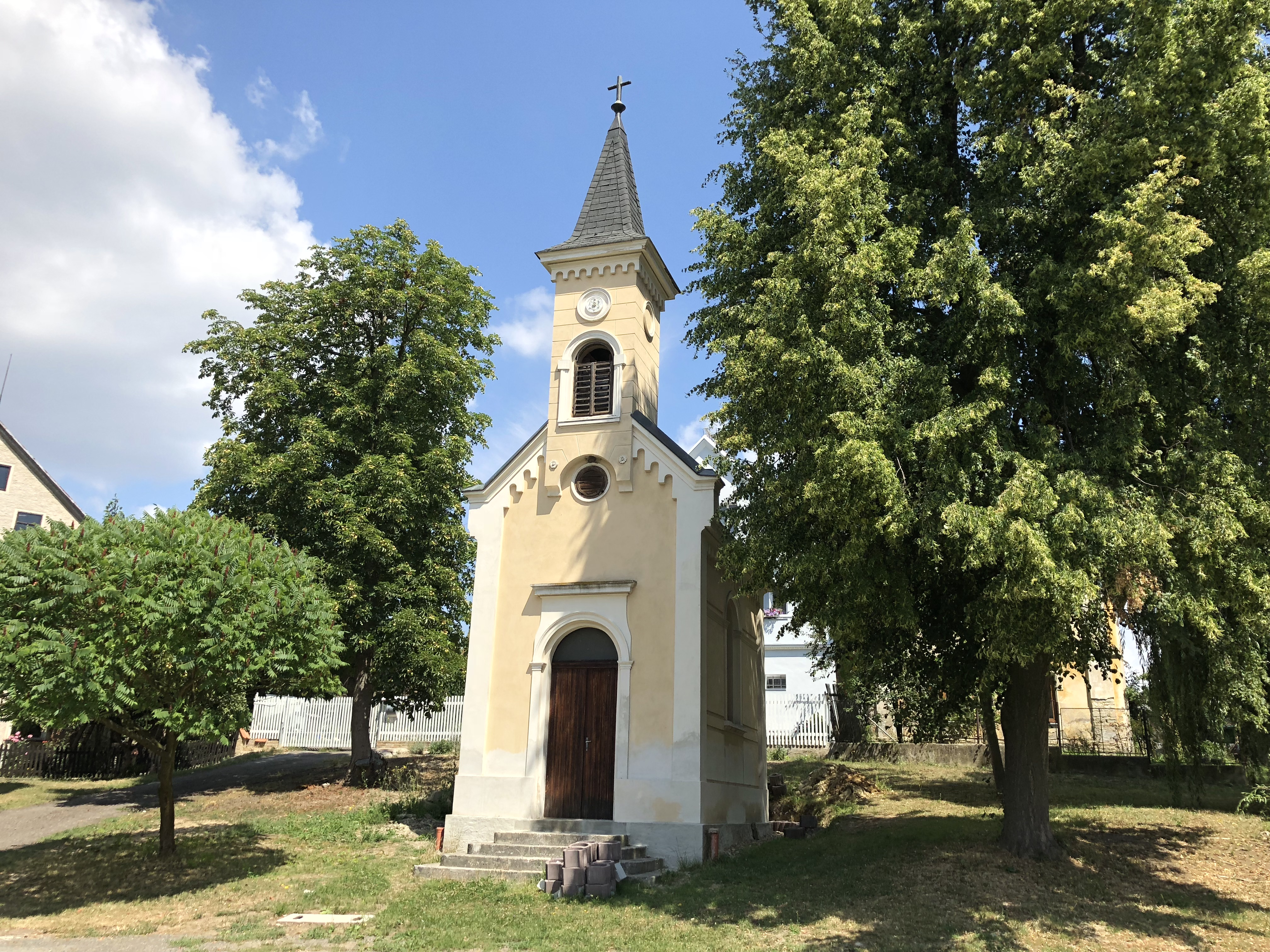
- Chapel in the centre of Horní Řepčice

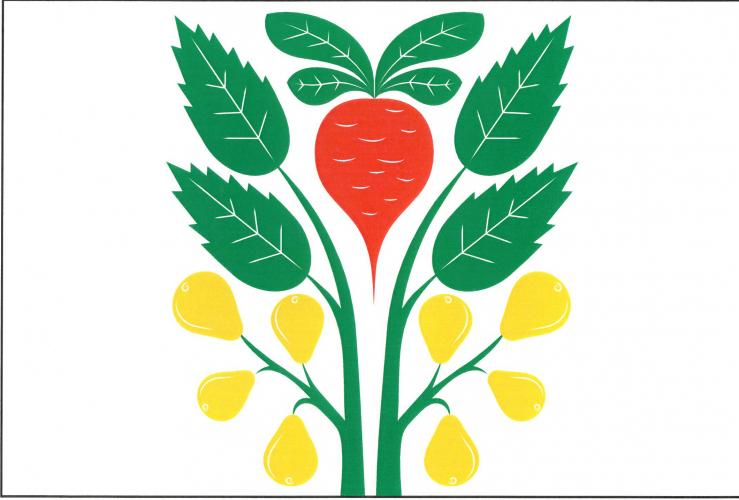
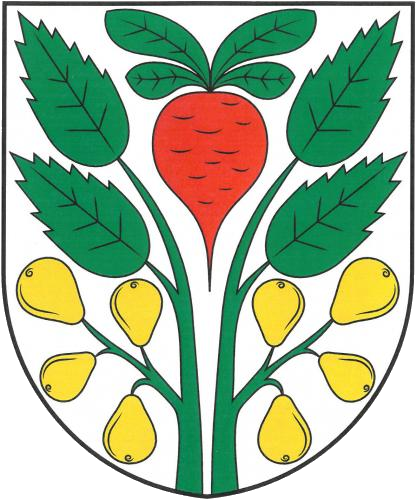
- Flag Coat of arms

- Location in the Czech Republic
- Coordinates: 50°33′25″N 14°15′9″E
- Country: Czech Republic
- Region: Ústí nad Labem
- District: Litoměřice
- First mentioned: 1057

Area
  - Total: 2.61 km^{2} (1.01 sq mi)
- Elevation: 256 m (840 ft)

Population (2026-01-01)
  - Total: 109
  - Density: 41.8/km^{2} (108/sq mi)
- Time zone: UTC+1 (CET)
  - Summer (DST): UTC+2 (CEST)
- Postal code: 412 01
- Website: hornirepcice.cz

Horní Řepčice (German: Ober Repsch) is a municipality and village in Litoměřice District in the Ústí nad Labem Region of the Czech Republic. It has about 100 inhabitants.

Horní Řepčice lies approximately 11 kilometres (7 mi) east of Litoměřice, 19 km (12 mi) south-east of Ústí nad Labem, and 54 km (34 mi) north of Prague.

== Demographics ==
Historical population
Year	Pop.	±%
1869	248	—
1880	228	−8.1%
1890	231	+1.3%
1900	256	+10.8%
1910	274	+7.0%
1921	276	+0.7%
1930	246	−10.9%
1950	183	−25.6%
1961	176	−3.8%
1970	146	−17.0%
1980	132	−9.6%
1991	104	−21.2%
2001	98	−5.8%
2011	105	+7.1%
2021	99	−5.7%
Source: Censuses
