= Keblice =

- Municipality
- View from the west

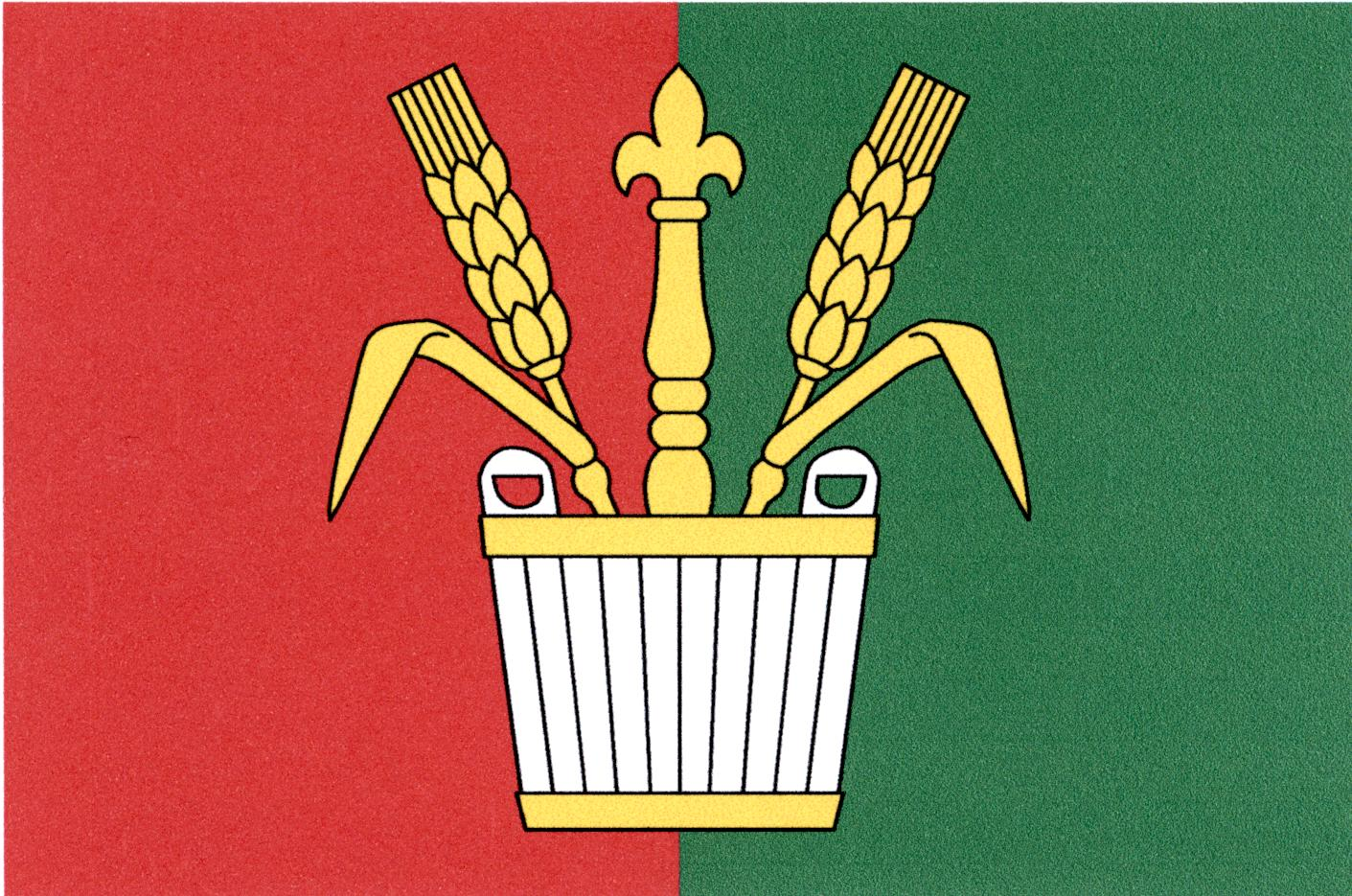
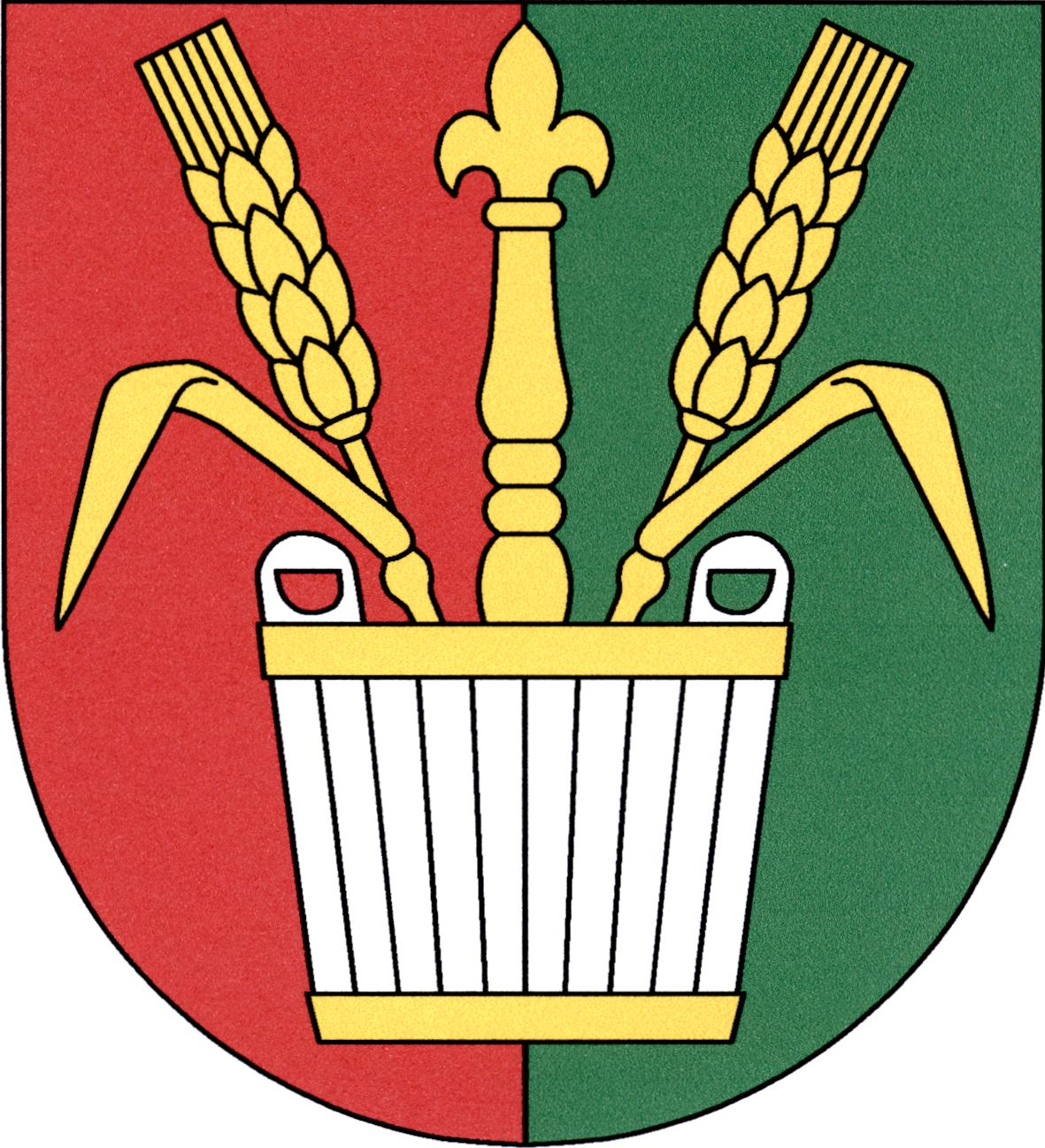
- Flag Coat of arms

- Location in the Czech Republic
- Coordinates: 50°28′48″N 14°6′7″E
- Country: Czech Republic
- Region: Ústí nad Labem
- District: Litoměřice
- First mentioned: 1249

Area
  - Total: 5.08 km^{2} (1.96 sq mi)
- Elevation: 153 m (502 ft)

Population (2026-01-01)
  - Total: 376
  - Density: 74.0/km^{2} (192/sq mi)
- Time zone: UTC+1 (CET)
  - Summer (DST): UTC+2 (CEST)
- Postal code: 410 02
- Website: www.keblice.cz

Keblice is a municipality and village in Litoměřice District in the Ústí nad Labem Region of the Czech Republic. It has about 400 inhabitants.

Keblice lies approximately 6 kilometres (4 mi) south of Litoměřice, 21 km (13 mi) south of Ústí nad Labem, and 50 km (31 mi) north-west of Prague.

== Demographics ==
Historical population
Year	Pop.	±%
1869	556	—
1880	524	−5.8%
1890	568	+8.4%
1900	722	+27.1%
1910	773	+7.1%
1921	755	−2.3%
1930	724	−4.1%
1950	458	−36.7%
1961	495	+8.1%
1970	427	−13.7%
1980	365	−14.5%
1991	295	−19.2%
2001	313	+6.1%
2011	368	+17.6%
2021	369	+0.3%
Source: Censuses
