= Miřejovice =

- Municipality
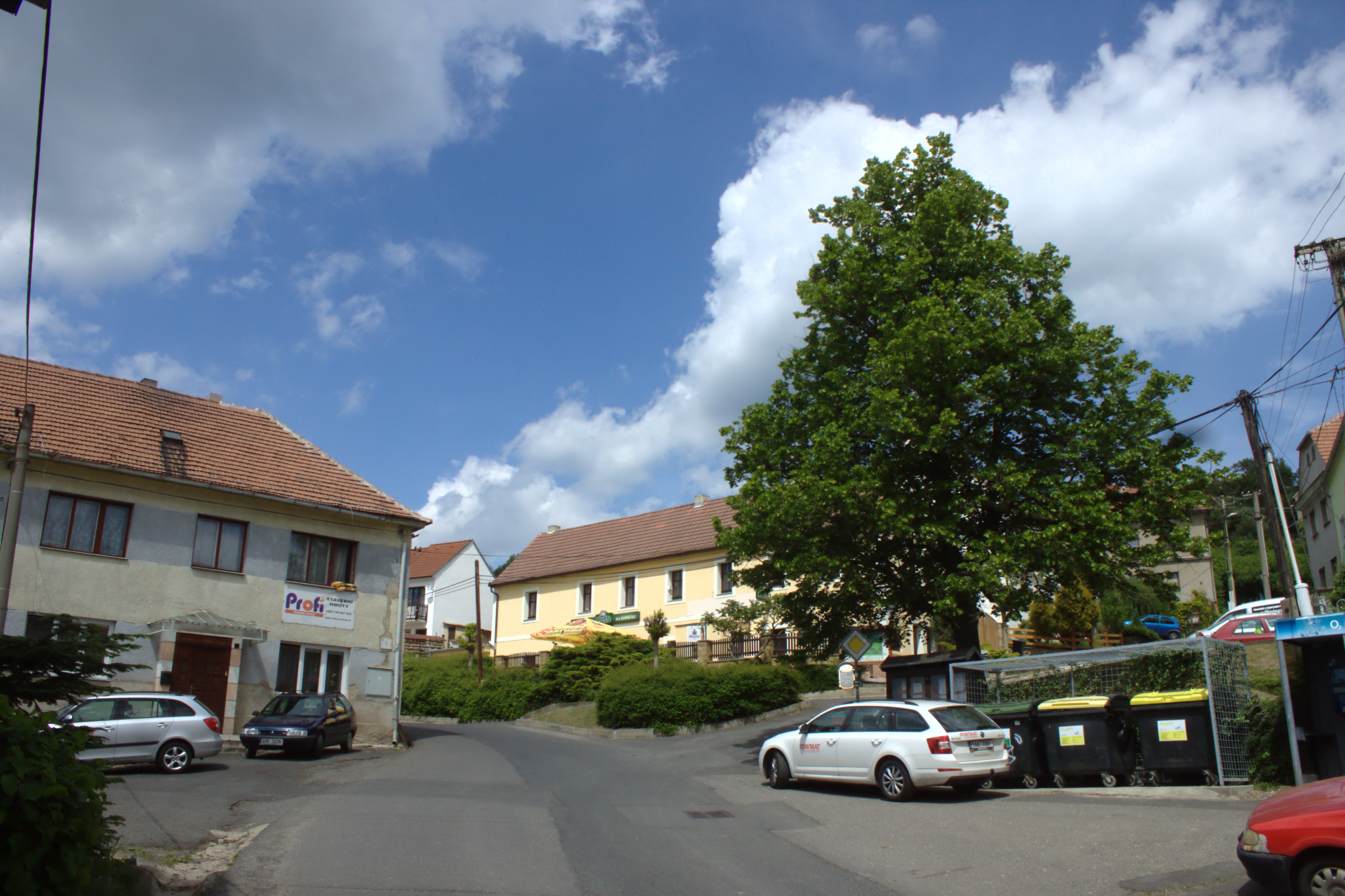
- Centre of Miřejovice

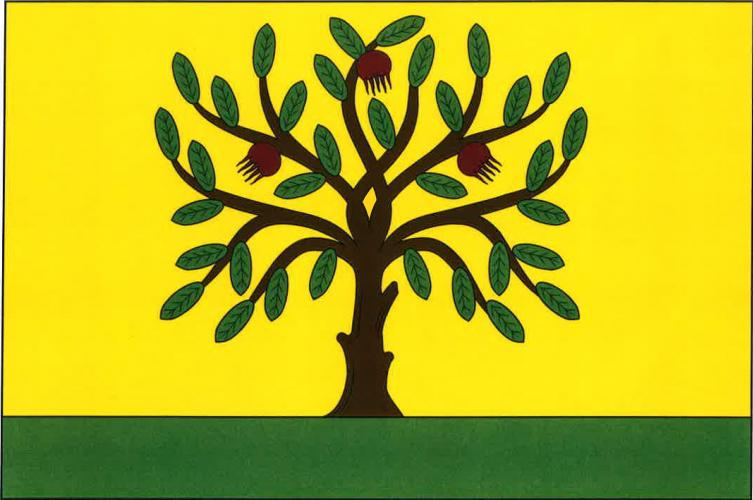
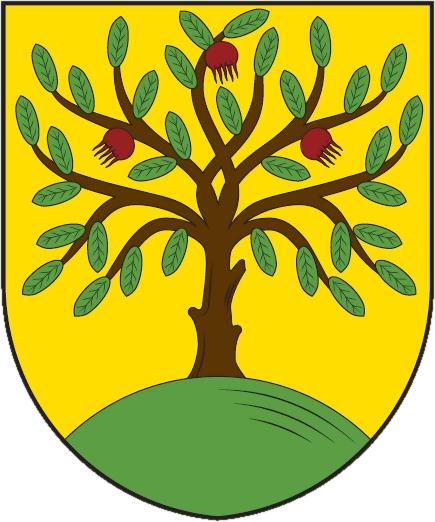
- Flag Coat of arms

- Location in the Czech Republic
- Coordinates: 50°33′12″N 14°6′32″E
- Country: Czech Republic
- Region: Ústí nad Labem
- District: Litoměřice
- First mentioned: 1322

Area
  - Total: 1.98 km^{2} (0.76 sq mi)
- Elevation: 273 m (896 ft)

Population (2026-01-01)
  - Total: 216
  - Density: 109/km^{2} (283/sq mi)
- Time zone: UTC+1 (CET)
  - Summer (DST): UTC+2 (CEST)
- Postal code: 412 01
- Website: www.mirejovice.cz

Miřejovice is a municipality and village in Litoměřice District in the Ústí nad Labem Region of the Czech Republic. It has about 200 inhabitants.

Miřejovice lies approximately 3 kilometres (2 mi) north of Litoměřice, 12 km (7 mi) south of Ústí nad Labem, and 57 km (35 mi) north-west of Prague.

== Demographics ==
Historical population
Year	Pop.	±%
1869	210	—
1880	190	−9.5%
1890	171	−10.0%
1900	189	+10.5%
1910	194	+2.6%
1921	226	+16.5%
1930	258	+14.2%
1950	174	−32.6%
1961	188	+8.0%
1970	182	−3.2%
1980	165	−9.3%
1991	146	−11.5%
2001	172	+17.8%
2011	189	+9.9%
2021	209	+10.6%
Source: Censuses
