= Dolánky nad Ohří =

- Municipality
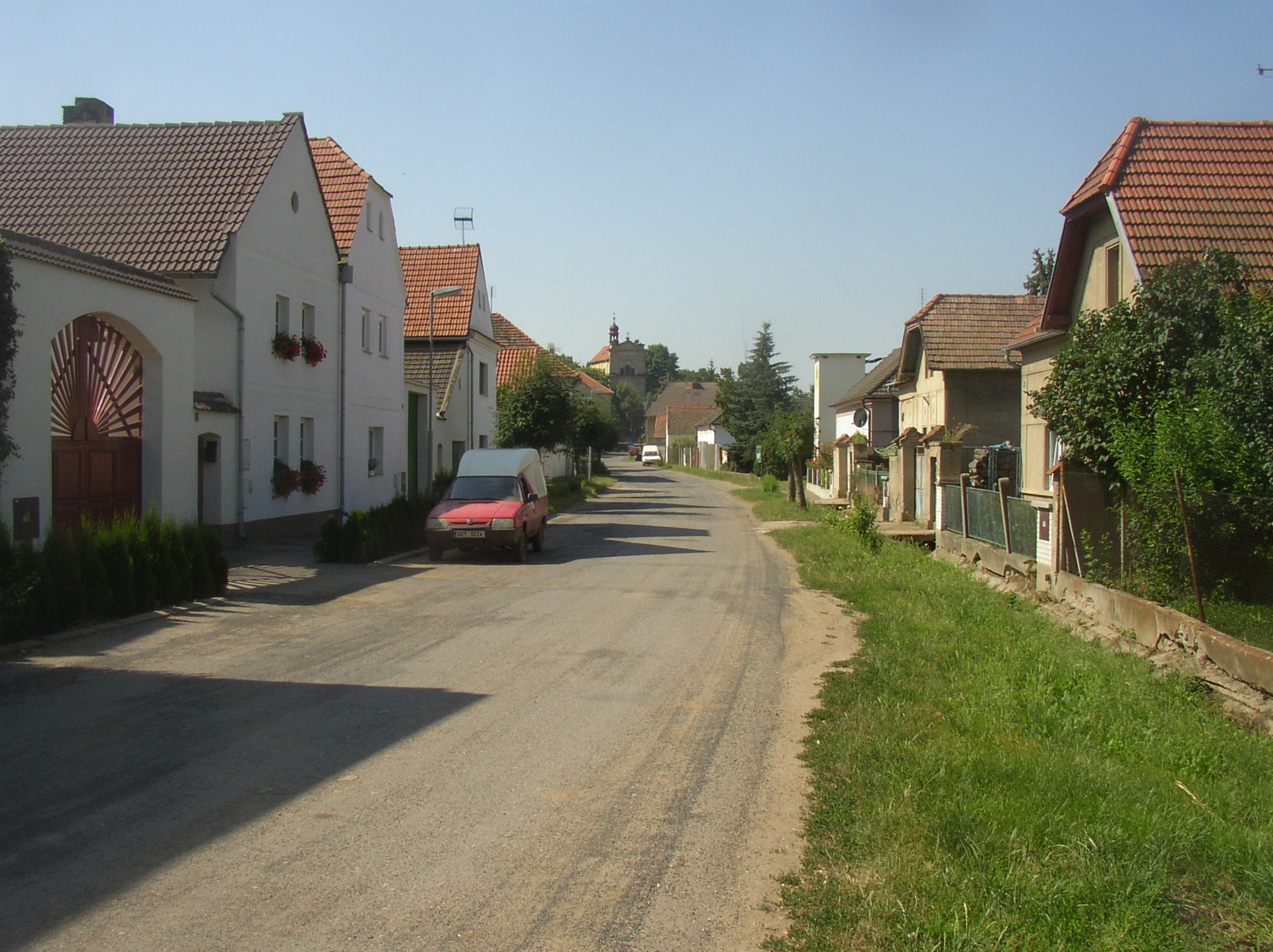
- Main street

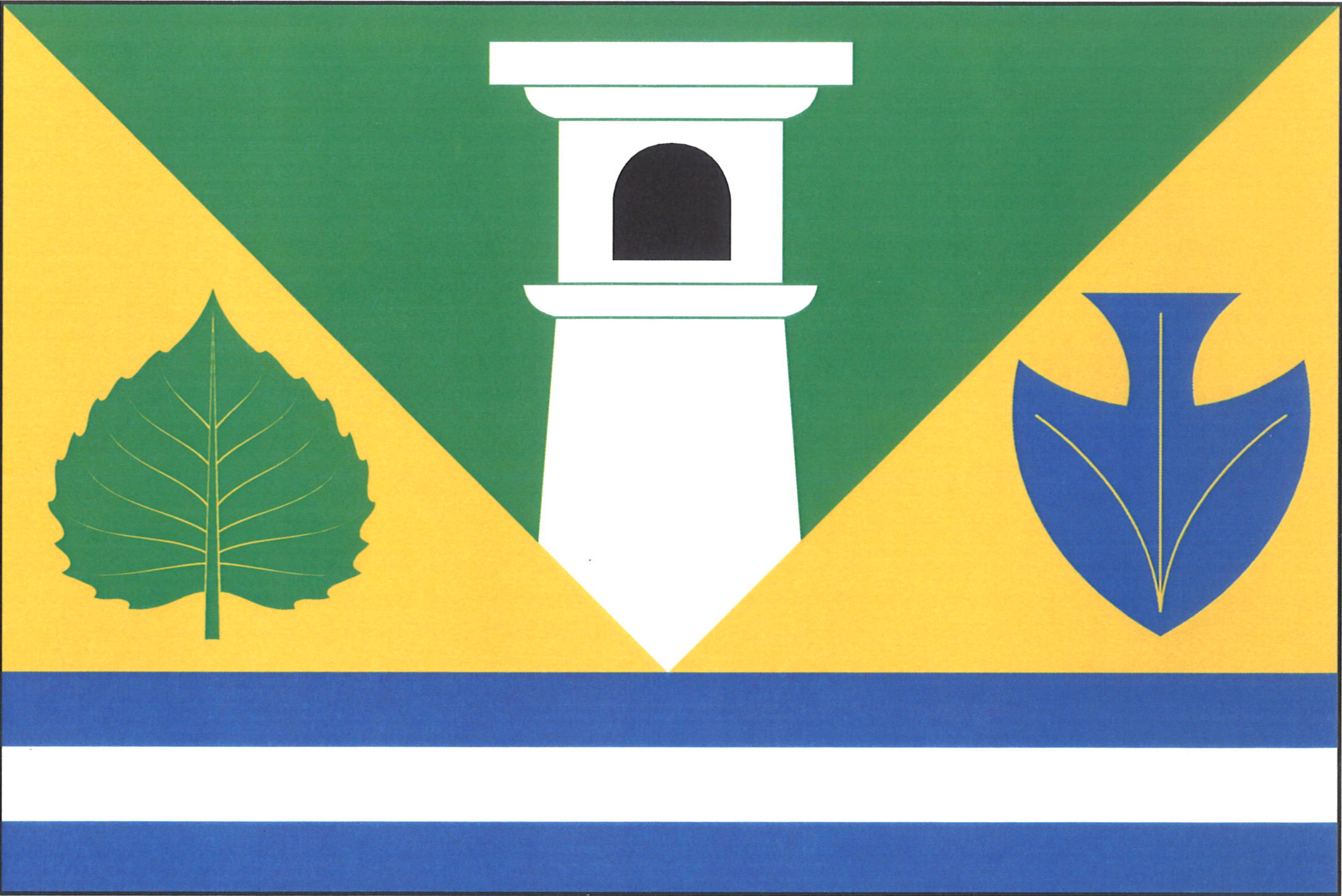
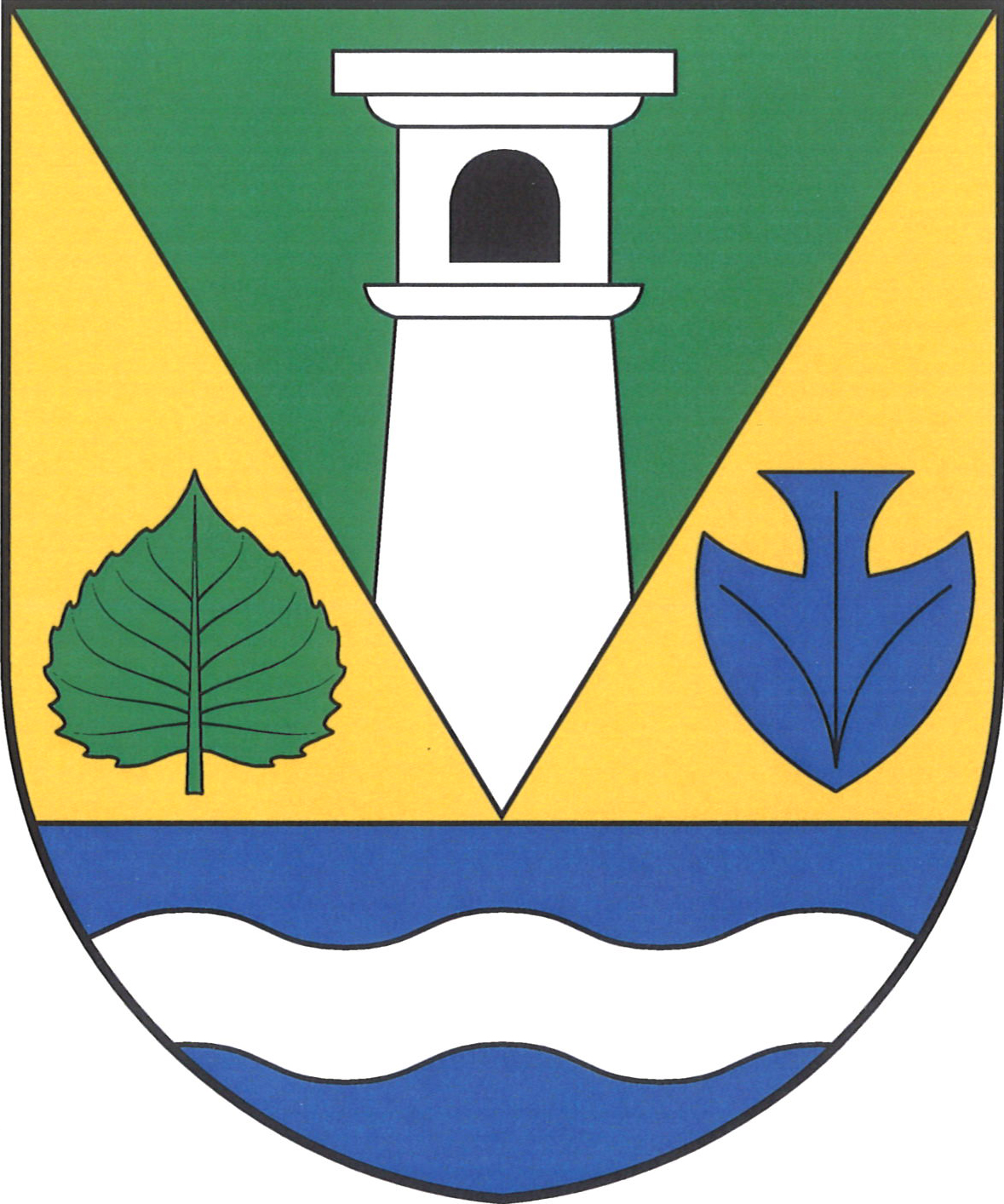
- Flag Coat of arms

- Location in the Czech Republic
- Coordinates: 50°28′23″N 14°9′46″E
- Country: Czech Republic
- Region: Ústí nad Labem
- District: Litoměřice
- First mentioned: 1057

Area
  - Total: 3.32 km^{2} (1.28 sq mi)
- Elevation: 160 m (520 ft)

Population (2026-01-01)
  - Total: 301
  - Density: 90.7/km^{2} (235/sq mi)
- Time zone: UTC+1 (CET)
  - Summer (DST): UTC+2 (CEST)
- Postal code: 413 01
- Website: www.dolankyno.cz

Dolánky nad Ohří is a municipality and village in Litoměřice District in the Ústí nad Labem Region of the Czech Republic. It has about 300 inhabitants.

Dolánky nad Ohří lies approximately 8 kilometres (5 mi) south-east of Litoměřice, 23 km (14 mi) south-east of Ústí nad Labem, and 47 km (29 mi) north-west of Prague.

== Demographics ==
Historical population
| Year | Pop. | ±% |
|---|---|---|
| 1869 | 494 | — |
| 1880 | 635 | +28.5% |
| 1890 | 679 | +6.9% |
| 1900 | 647 | −4.7% |
| 1910 | 659 | +1.9% |
| 1921 | 637 | −3.3% |
| 1930 | 651 | +2.2% |
| 1950 | 477 | −26.7% |
| 1961 | 450 | −5.7% |
| 1970 | 405 | −10.0% |
| 1980 | 319 | −21.2% |
| 1991 | 251 | −21.3% |
| 2001 | 225 | −10.4% |
| 2011 | 258 | +14.7% |
| 2021 | 281 | +8.9% |
Source: Censuses
