= Slatina (Litoměřice District) =

- Municipality
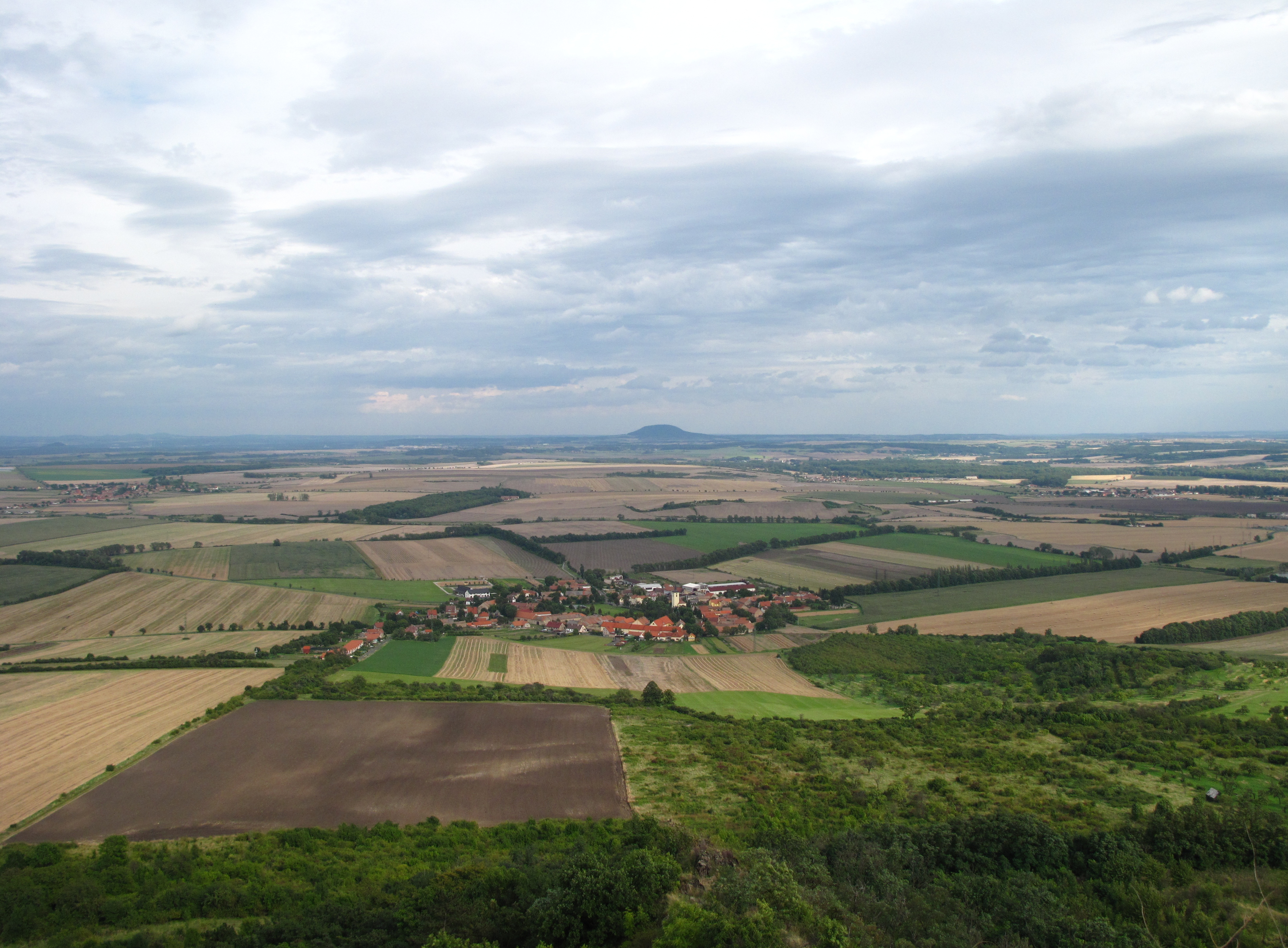
- View from the west

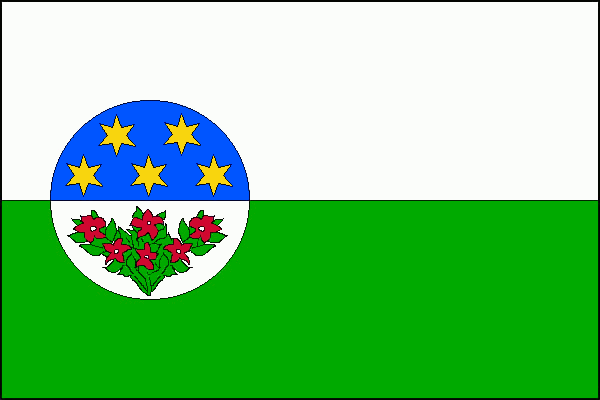
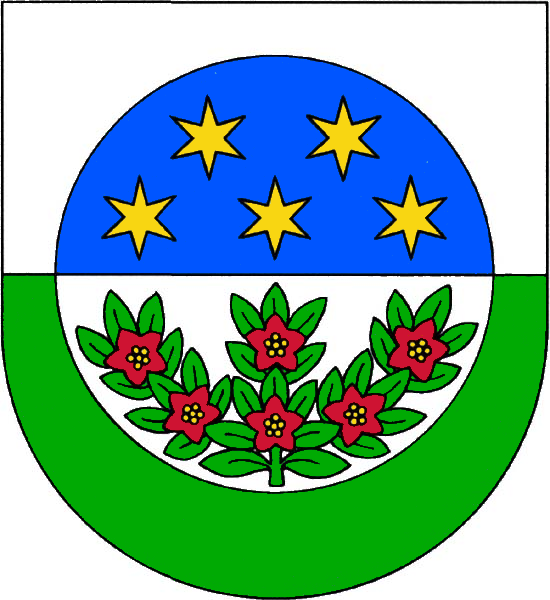
- Flag Coat of arms

- Location in the Czech Republic
- Coordinates: 50°25′50″N 14°2′17″E
- Country: Czech Republic
- Region: Ústí nad Labem
- District: Litoměřice
- First mentioned: 1057

Area
  - Total: 6.94 km^{2} (2.68 sq mi)
- Elevation: 177 m (581 ft)

Population (2026-01-01)
  - Total: 289
  - Density: 41.6/km^{2} (108/sq mi)
- Time zone: UTC+1 (CET)
  - Summer (DST): UTC+2 (CEST)
- Postal code: 411 17
- Website: slatina-lt.cz

Slatina is a municipality and village in Litoměřice District in the Ústí nad Labem Region of the Czech Republic. It has about 300 inhabitants.

Slatina lies approximately 13 kilometres (8 mi) south-west of Litoměřice, 26 km (16 mi) south of Ústí nad Labem, and 47 km (29 mi) north-west of Prague.

== Demographics ==
Historical population
Year	Pop.	±%
1869	360	—
1880	394	+9.4%
1890	419	+6.3%
1900	455	+8.6%
1910	461	+1.3%
1921	502	+8.9%
1930	489	−2.6%
1950	311	−36.4%
1961	317	+1.9%
1970	279	−12.0%
1980	248	−11.1%
1991	201	−19.0%
2001	211	+5.0%
2011	255	+20.9%
2021	253	−0.8%
Source: Censuses
