= Malíč =

- Municipality
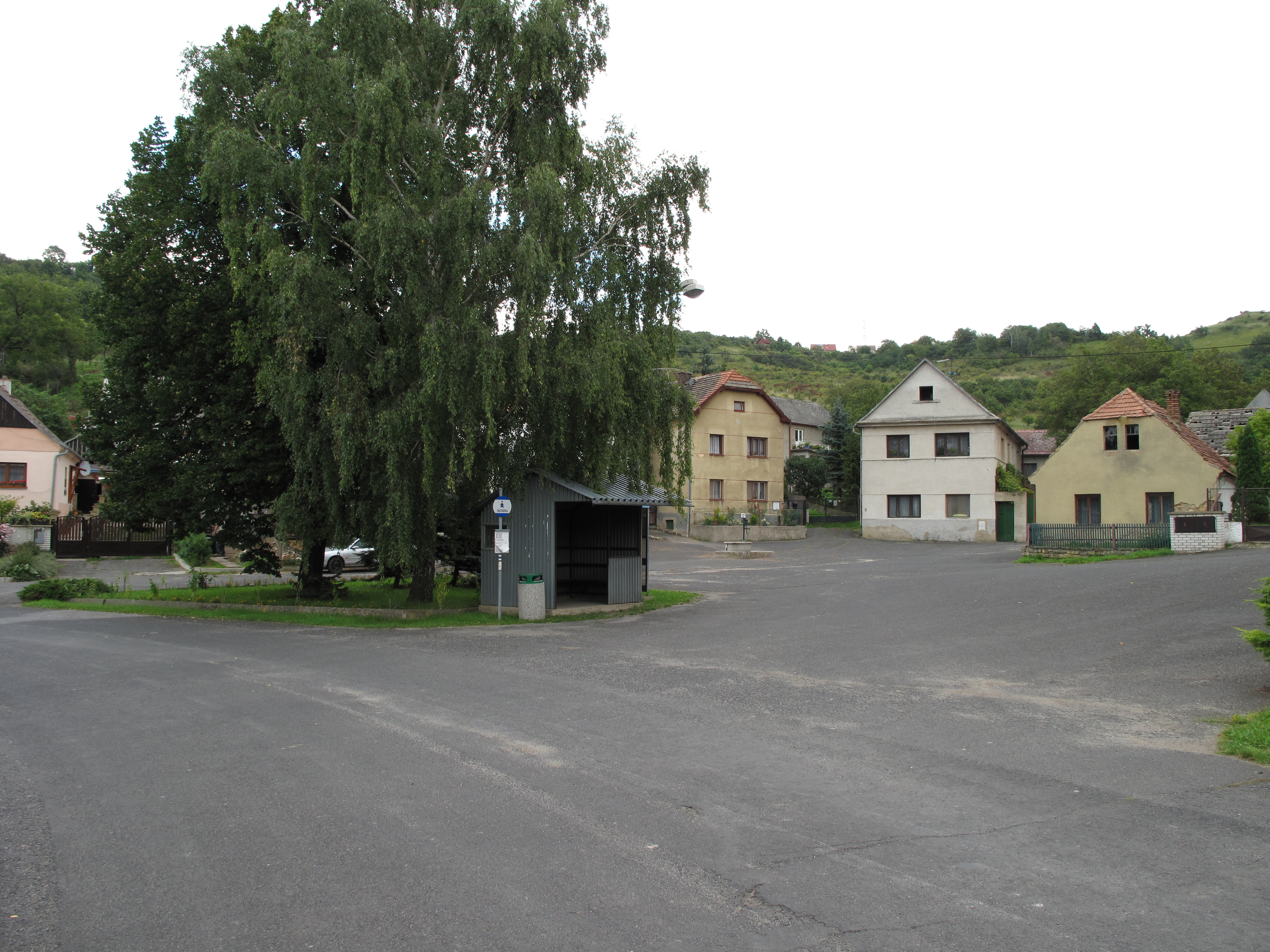
- Centre of Malíč

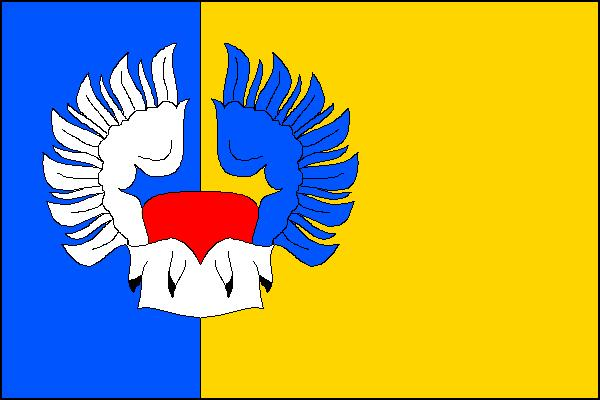
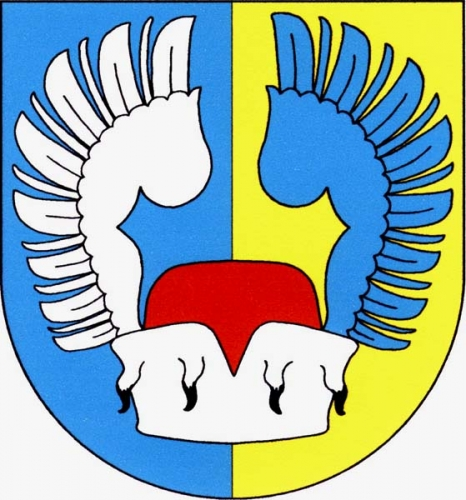
- Flag Coat of arms

- Location in the Czech Republic
- Coordinates: 50°32′37″N 14°4′56″E
- Country: Czech Republic
- Region: Ústí nad Labem
- District: Litoměřice
- First mentioned: 1276

Area
  - Total: 1.41 km^{2} (0.54 sq mi)
- Elevation: 218 m (715 ft)

Population (2026-01-01)
  - Total: 192
  - Density: 136/km^{2} (353/sq mi)
- Time zone: UTC+1 (CET)
  - Summer (DST): UTC+2 (CEST)
- Postal code: 412 01
- Website: www.malic.cz

Malíč is a municipality and village in Litoměřice District in the Ústí nad Labem Region of the Czech Republic. It has about 200 inhabitants.

Malíč lies approximately 3 kilometres (2 mi) north-west of Litoměřice, 14 km (9 mi) south of Ústí nad Labem, and 56 km (35 mi) north-west of Prague.

== Demographics ==
Historical population
Year	Pop.	±%
1869	369	—
1880	347	−6.0%
1890	327	−5.8%
1900	350	+7.0%
1910	372	+6.3%
1921	399	+7.3%
1930	442	+10.8%
1950	290	−34.4%
1961	317	+9.3%
1970	270	−14.8%
1980	190	−29.6%
1991	122	−35.8%
2001	141	+15.6%
2011	147	+4.3%
2021	177	+20.4%
Source: Censuses
