= Kyškovice =

- Municipality
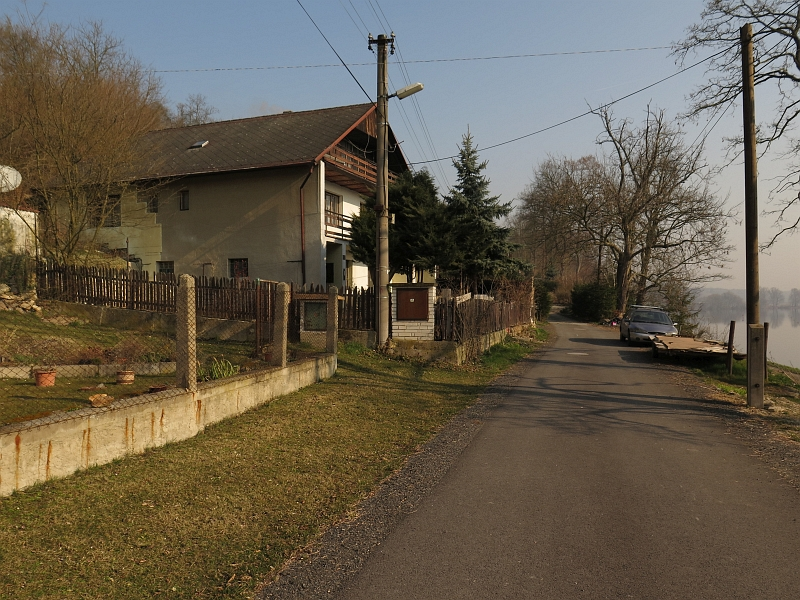
- A street along the Elbe River

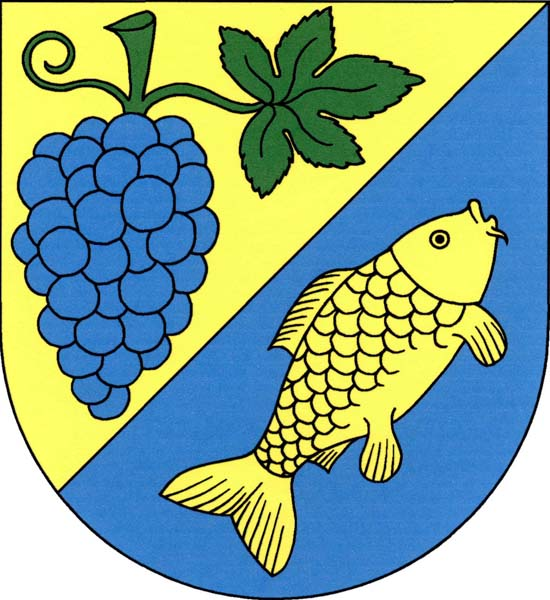
- Flag Coat of arms

- Location in the Czech Republic
- Coordinates: 50°26′54″N 14°17′9″E
- Country: Czech Republic
- Region: Ústí nad Labem
- District: Litoměřice
- First mentioned: 1253

Area
  - Total: 3.45 km^{2} (1.33 sq mi)
- Elevation: 155 m (509 ft)

Population (2026-01-01)
  - Total: 305
  - Density: 88.4/km^{2} (229/sq mi)
- Time zone: UTC+1 (CET)
  - Summer (DST): UTC+2 (CEST)
- Postal code: 413 01
- Website: www.kyskovice.cz

Kyškovice is a municipality and village in Litoměřice District in the Ústí nad Labem Region of the Czech Republic. It has about 300 inhabitants.

Kyškovice lies approximately 15 kilometres (9 mi) south-east of Litoměřice, 29 km (18 mi) south-east of Ústí nad Labem, and 42 km (26 mi) north of Prague. It lies on the right bank of the Elbe River.

== Demographics ==
Historical population
Year	Pop.	±%
1869	185	—
1880	236	+27.6%
1890	252	+6.8%
1900	271	+7.5%
1910	325	+19.9%
1921	356	+9.5%
1930	366	+2.8%
1950	283	−22.7%
1961	275	−2.8%
1970	261	−5.1%
1980	222	−14.9%
1991	221	−0.5%
2001	251	+13.6%
2011	292	+16.3%
2021	287	−1.7%
Source: Censuses
