= Rochov =

- Municipality
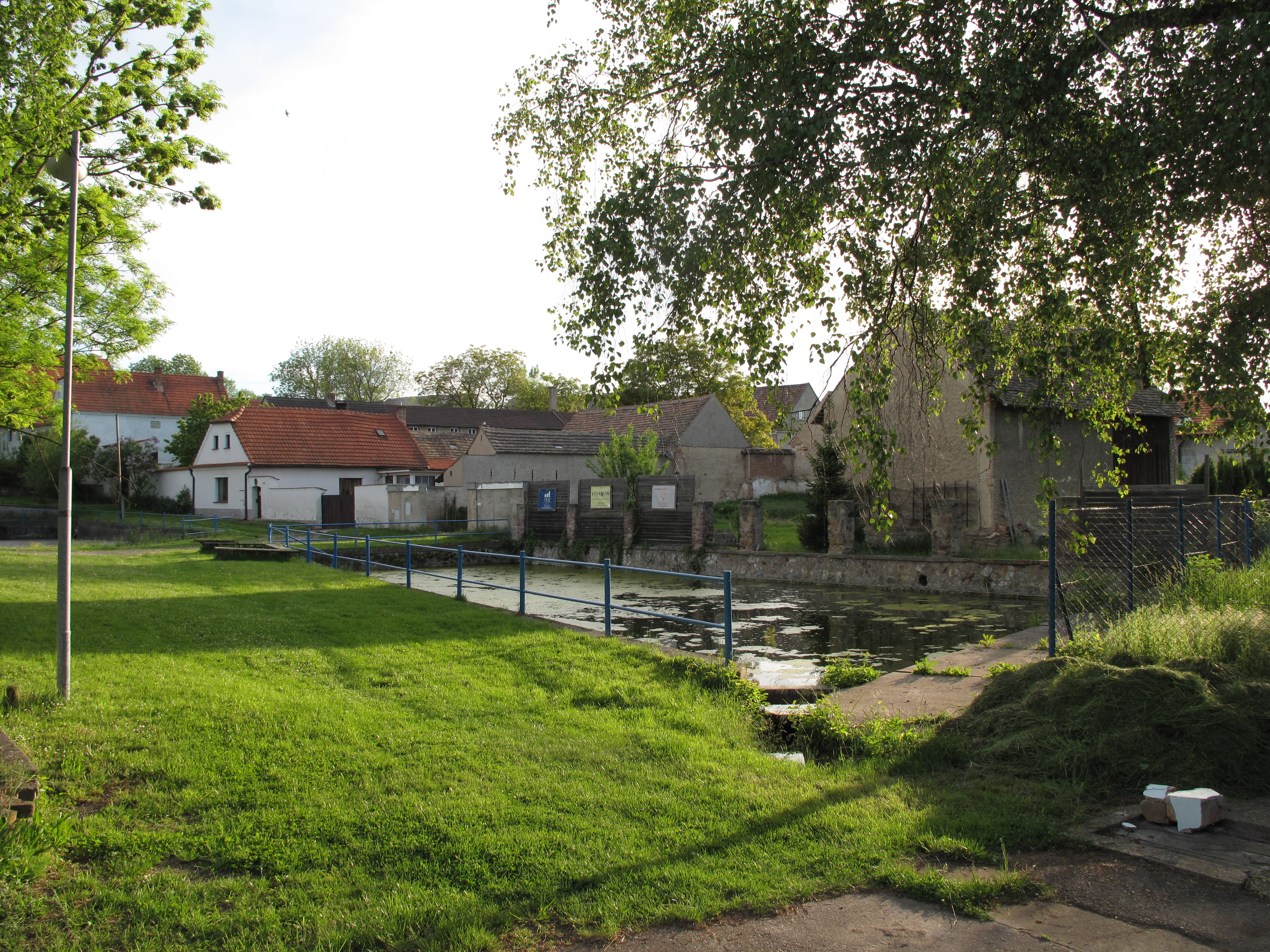
- Water tank in the centre of Rochov

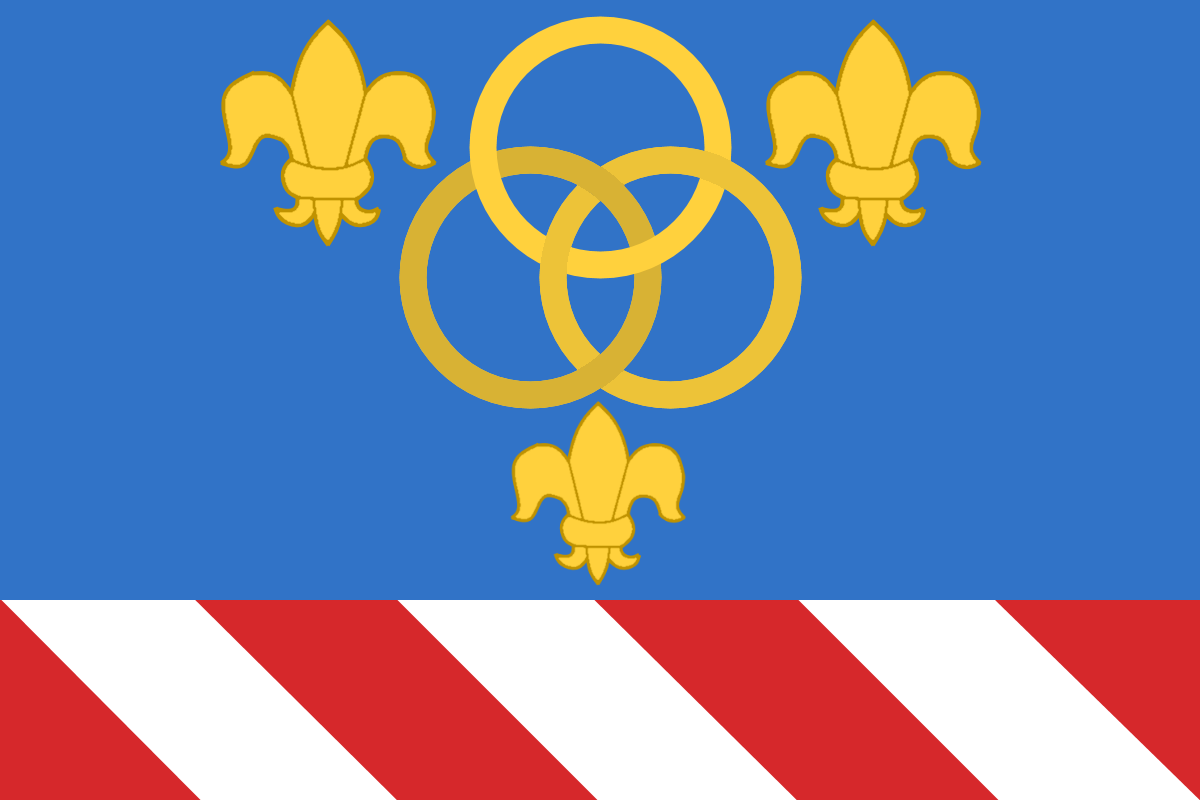
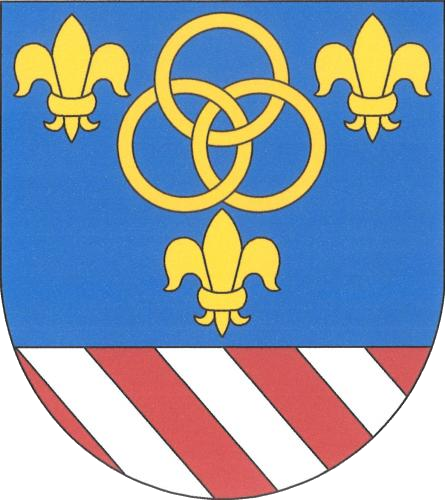
- Flag Coat of arms

- Location in the Czech Republic
- Coordinates: 50°27′34″N 14°7′3″E
- Country: Czech Republic
- Region: Ústí nad Labem
- District: Litoměřice
- First mentioned: 1219

Area
  - Total: 3.30 km^{2} (1.27 sq mi)
- Elevation: 195 m (640 ft)

Population (2026-01-01)
  - Total: 143
  - Density: 43.3/km^{2} (112/sq mi)
- Time zone: UTC+1 (CET)
  - Summer (DST): UTC+2 (CEST)
- Postal code: 413 01
- Website: www.rochov.cz

Rochov is a municipality and village in Litoměřice District in the Ústí nad Labem Region of the Czech Republic. It has about 100 inhabitants.

Rochov lies approximately 9 kilometres (6 mi) south of Litoměřice, 23 km (14 mi) south of Ústí nad Labem, and 47 km (29 mi) north-west of Prague.

== Demographics ==
Historical population
Year	Pop.	±%
1869	231	—
1880	284	+22.9%
1890	300	+5.6%
1900	283	−5.7%
1910	322	+13.8%
1921	336	+4.3%
1930	298	−11.3%
1950	231	−22.5%
1961	177	−23.4%
1970	199	+12.4%
1980	152	−23.6%
1991	132	−13.2%
2001	105	−20.5%
2011	113	+7.6%
2021	153	+35.4%
Source: Censuses
