= Drahobuz =

- Municipality
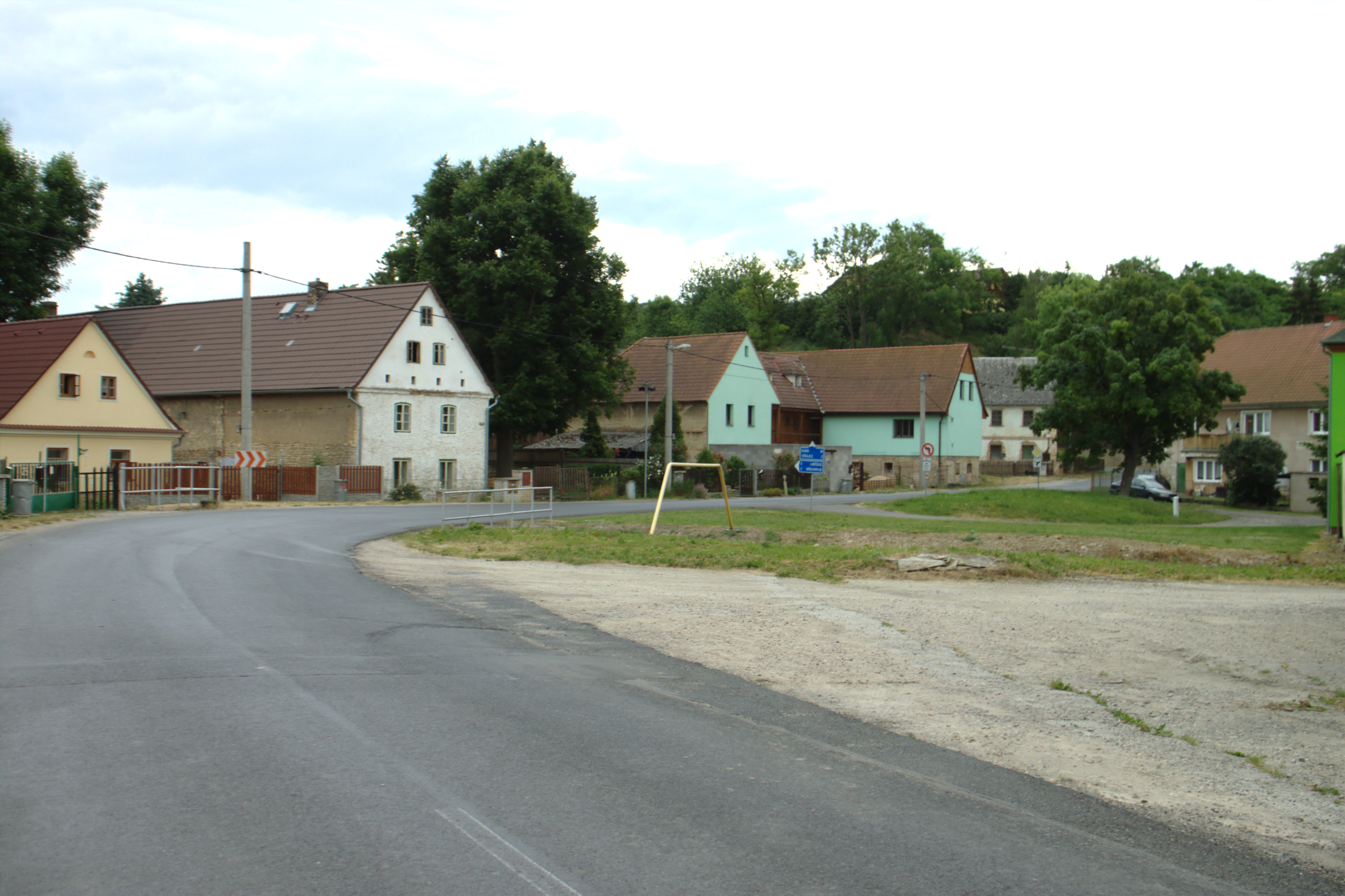
- A street in Drahobuz

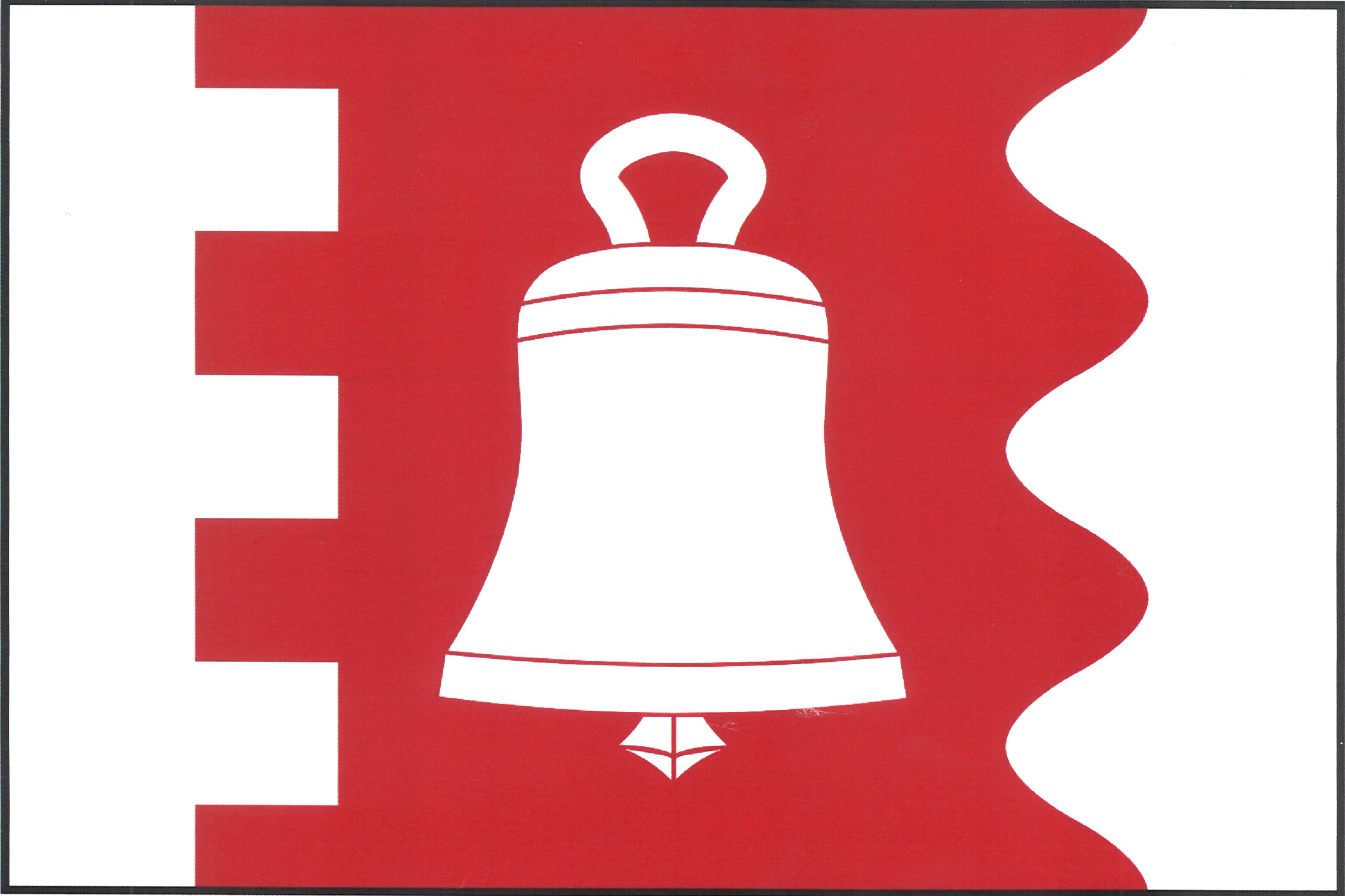
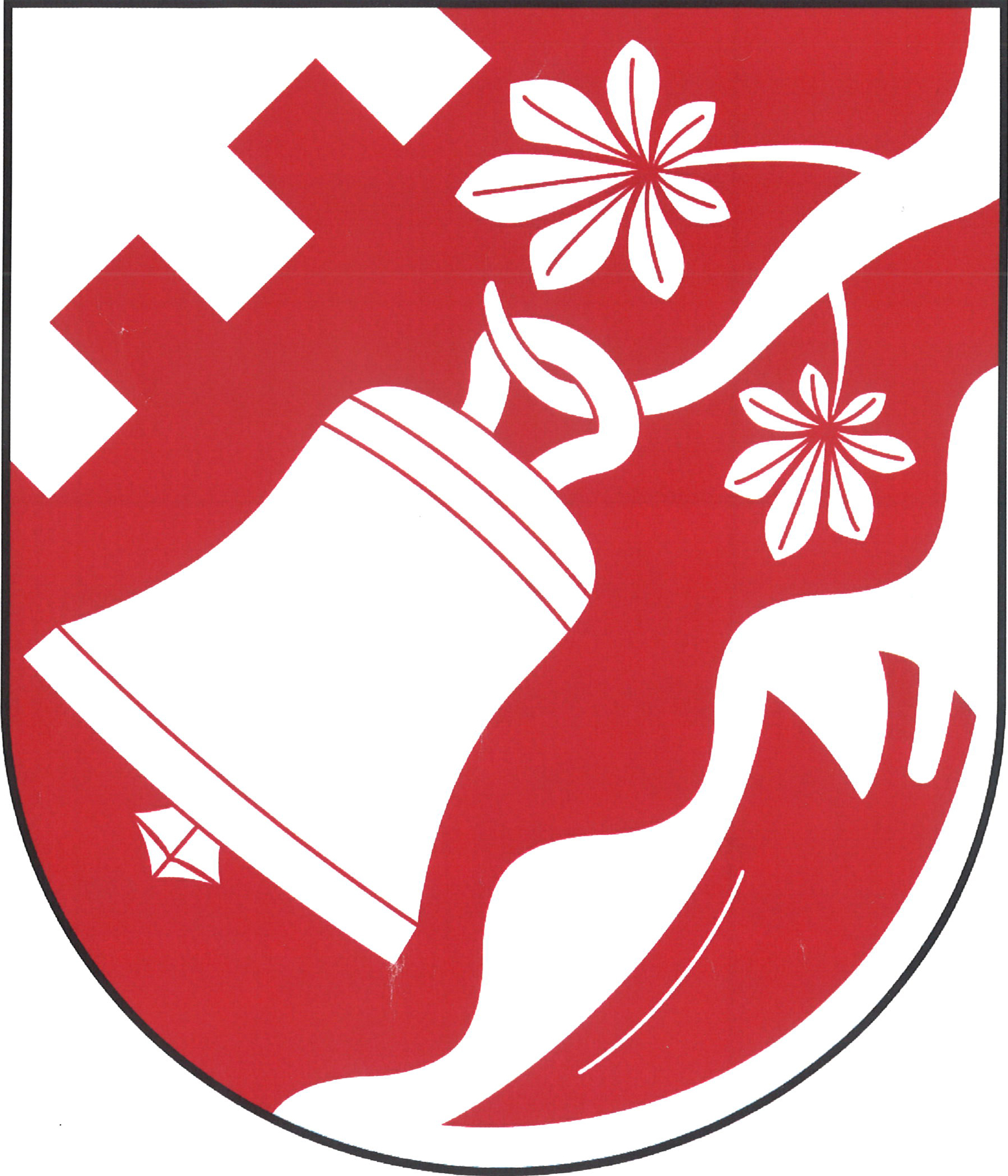
- Flag Coat of arms

- Location in the Czech Republic
- Coordinates: 50°31′31″N 14°19′15″E
- Country: Czech Republic
- Region: Ústí nad Labem
- District: Litoměřice
- First mentioned: 1374

Area
  - Total: 9.96 km^{2} (3.85 sq mi)
- Elevation: 176 m (577 ft)

Population (2026-01-01)
  - Total: 287
  - Density: 28.8/km^{2} (74.6/sq mi)
- Time zone: UTC+1 (CET)
  - Summer (DST): UTC+2 (CEST)
- Postal code: 411 45
- Website: www.drahobuz.cz

Drahobuz is a municipality and village in Litoměřice District in the Ústí nad Labem Region of the Czech Republic. It has about 300 inhabitants.

Drahobuz lies approximately 15 kilometres (9 mi) east of Litoměřice, 25 km (16 mi) south-east of Ústí nad Labem, and 50 km (31 mi) north of Prague.

== Administrative division ==
Drahobuz consists of three municipal parts (in brackets population according to the 2021 census):

- Drahobuz (211)
- Břehoryje (44)
- Strážiště (28)

== Demographics ==
Historical population
Year	Pop.	±%
1869	914	—
1880	962	+5.3%
1890	912	−5.2%
1900	850	−6.8%
1910	877	+3.2%
1921	840	−4.2%
1930	783	−6.8%
1950	438	−44.1%
1961	373	−14.8%
1970	324	−13.1%
1980	298	−8.0%
1991	220	−26.2%
2001	214	−2.7%
2011	258	+20.6%
2021	283	+9.7%
Source: Censuses
