= Sulejovice =

- Municipality
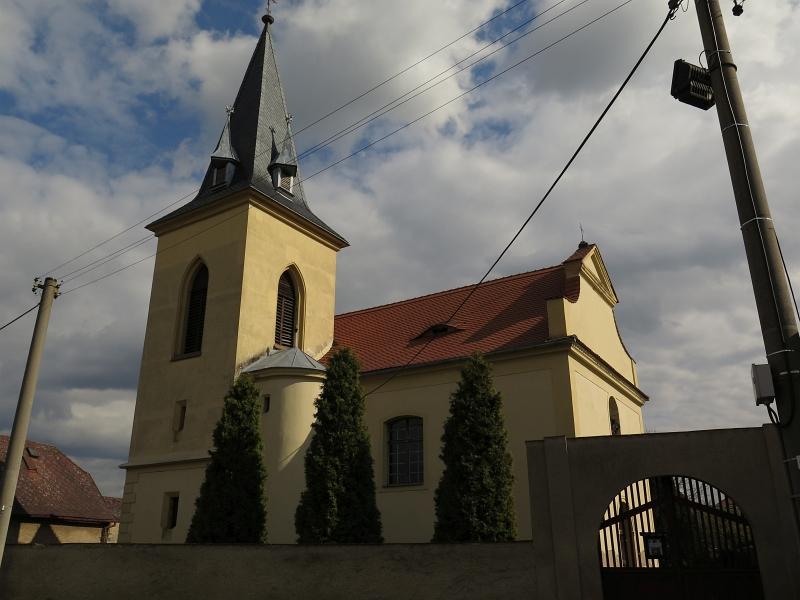
- Church of the Holy Trinity

- Flag Coat of arms

- Location in the Czech Republic
- Coordinates: 50°29′56″N 14°2′15″E
- Country: Czech Republic
- Region: Ústí nad Labem
- District: Litoměřice
- First mentioned: 1251

Area
  - Total: 3.71 km^{2} (1.43 sq mi)
- Elevation: 160 m (520 ft)

Population (2026-01-01)
  - Total: 694
  - Density: 187/km^{2} (484/sq mi)
- Time zone: UTC+1 (CET)
  - Summer (DST): UTC+2 (CEST)
- Postal code: 411 11
- Website: sulejovice.cz

Sulejovice (German: Sullowitz) is a municipality and village in Litoměřice District in the Ústí nad Labem Region of the Czech Republic. It has about 700 inhabitants.

Sulejovice lies approximately 7 kilometres (4 mi) south-west of Litoměřice, 18 km (11 mi) south of Ústí nad Labem, and 54 km (34 mi) north-west of Prague.

== Demographics ==
Historical population
Year	Pop.	±%
1869	455	—
1880	423	−7.0%
1890	370	−12.5%
1900	467	+26.2%
1910	646	+38.3%
1921	806	+24.8%
1930	1,116	+38.5%
1950	866	−22.4%
1961	930	+7.4%
1970	872	−6.2%
1980	891	+2.2%
1991	741	−16.8%
2001	717	−3.2%
2011	819	+14.2%
2021	691	−15.6%
Source: Censuses
