= Černiv =

- Municipality
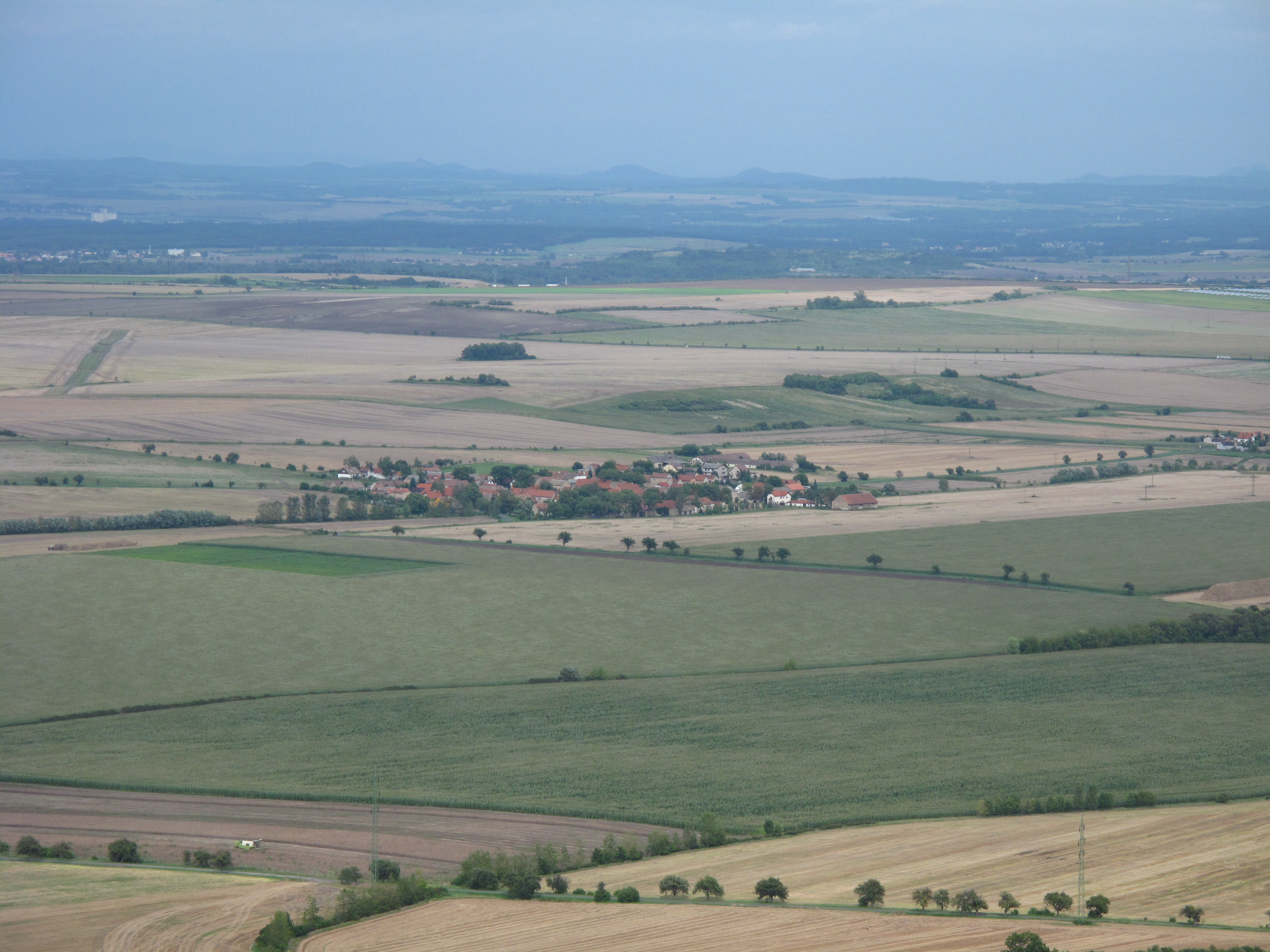
- View from the west

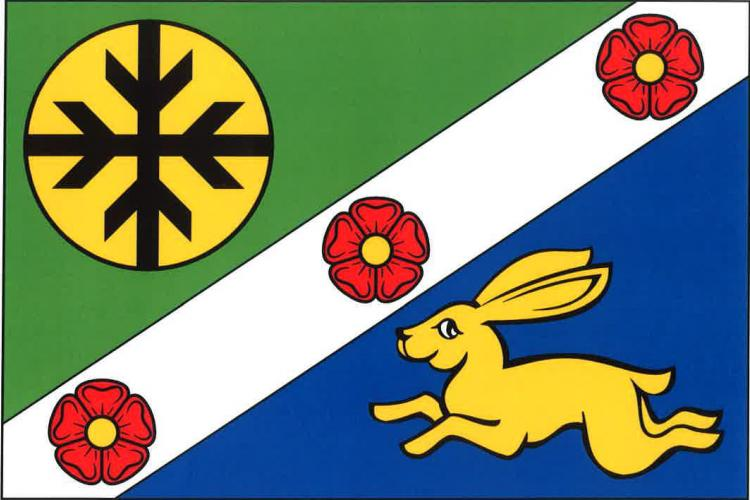
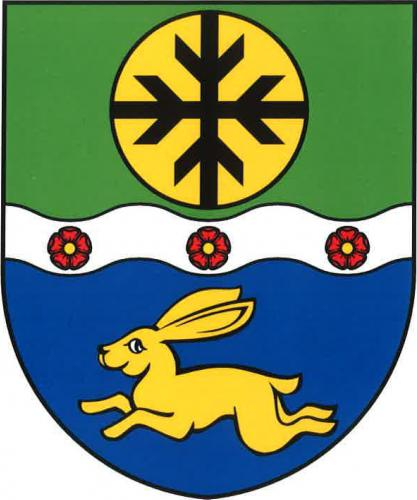
- Flag Coat of arms

- Location in the Czech Republic
- Coordinates: 50°26′42″N 14°3′33″E
- Country: Czech Republic
- Region: Ústí nad Labem
- District: Litoměřice
- First mentioned: 1307

Area
  - Total: 3.17 km^{2} (1.22 sq mi)
- Elevation: 183 m (600 ft)

Population (2026-01-01)
  - Total: 233
  - Density: 73.5/km^{2} (190/sq mi)
- Time zone: UTC+1 (CET)
  - Summer (DST): UTC+2 (CEST)
- Postal code: 410 02
- Website: www.cerniv.cz

Černiv is a municipality and village in Litoměřice District in the Ústí nad Labem Region of the Czech Republic. It has about 200 inhabitants.

Černiv lies approximately 11 kilometres (7 mi) south-west of Litoměřice, 24 km (15 mi) south of Ústí nad Labem, and 48 km (30 mi) north-west of Prague.

== Demographics ==
Historical population
Year	Pop.	±%
1869	276	—
1880	258	−6.5%
1890	246	−4.7%
1900	279	+13.4%
1910	296	+6.1%
1921	317	+7.1%
1930	325	+2.5%
1950	206	−36.6%
1961	213	+3.4%
1970	200	−6.1%
1980	153	−23.5%
1991	146	−4.6%
2001	133	−8.9%
2011	150	+12.8%
2021	130	−13.3%
Source: Censuses
