= Křesín =

- Municipality
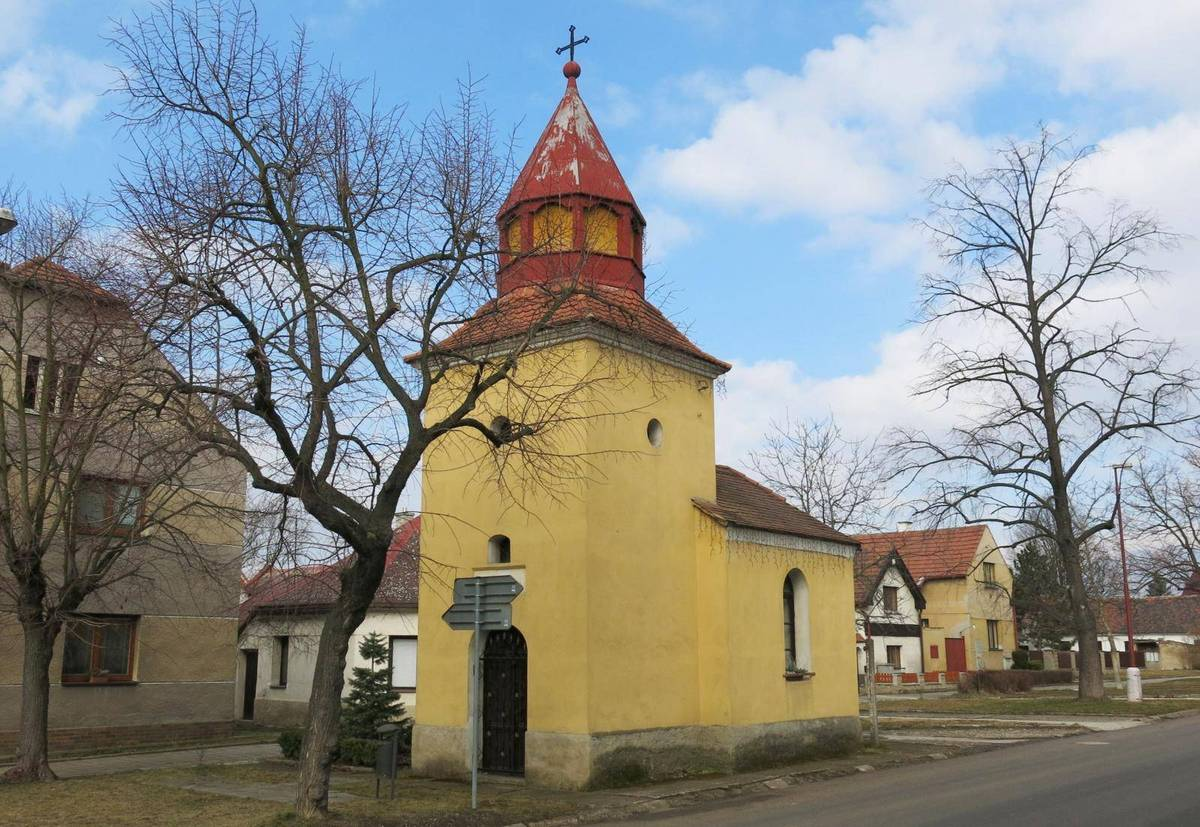
- Chapel in the centre of Křesín

- Flag Coat of arms

- Location in the Czech Republic
- Coordinates: 50°23′41″N 13°58′51″E
- Country: Czech Republic
- Region: Ústí nad Labem
- District: Litoměřice
- First mentioned: 1226

Area
  - Total: 9.80 km^{2} (3.78 sq mi)
- Elevation: 171 m (561 ft)

Population (2026-01-01)
  - Total: 335
  - Density: 34.2/km^{2} (88.5/sq mi)
- Time zone: UTC+1 (CET)
  - Summer (DST): UTC+2 (CEST)
- Postal code: 410 02
- Website: www.obeckresin.cz

Křesín is a municipality and village in Litoměřice District in the Ústí nad Labem Region of the Czech Republic. It has about 300 inhabitants.

Křesín lies approximately 18 kilometres (11 mi) south-west of Litoměřice, 29 km (18 mi) south of Ústí nad Labem, and 47 km (29 mi) north-west of Prague.

== Administrative division ==
Křesín consists of two municipal parts (in brackets population according to the 2021 census):

- Křesín (253)
- Levousy (96)

== Demographics ==
Historical population
| Year | Pop. | ±% |
|---|---|---|
| 1869 | 601 | — |
| 1880 | 632 | +5.2% |
| 1890 | 639 | +1.1% |
| 1900 | 619 | −3.1% |
| 1910 | 632 | +2.1% |
| 1921 | 668 | +5.7% |
| 1930 | 653 | −2.2% |
| 1950 | 521 | −20.2% |
| 1961 | 470 | −9.8% |
| 1970 | 433 | −7.9% |
| 1980 | 377 | −12.9% |
| 1991 | 317 | −15.9% |
| 2001 | 289 | −8.8% |
| 2011 | 345 | +19.4% |
| 2021 | 349 | +1.2% |
Source: Censuses
