= Litoměřice District =

Litoměřice District Okres Litoměřice
- District
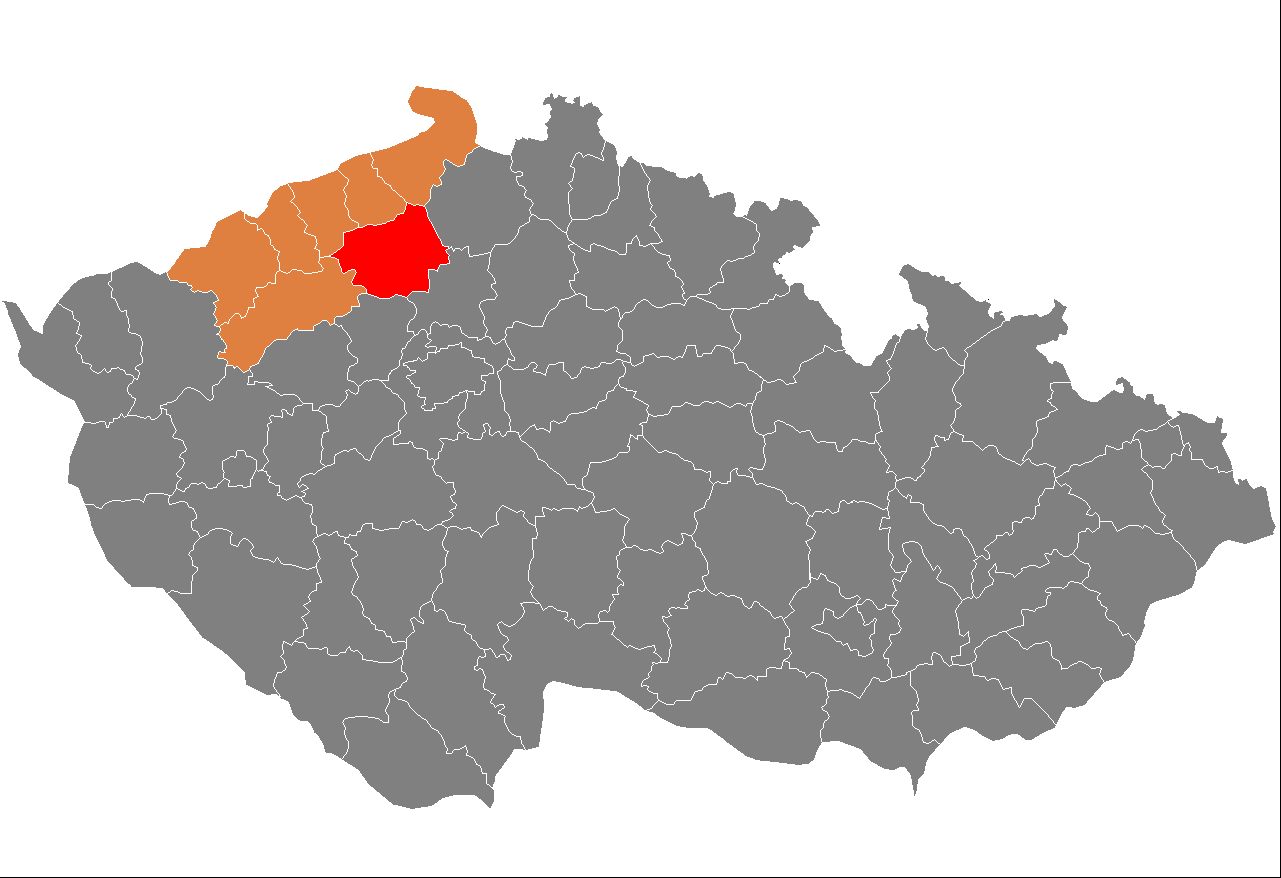
- Location in the Ústí nad Labem Region within the Czech Republic

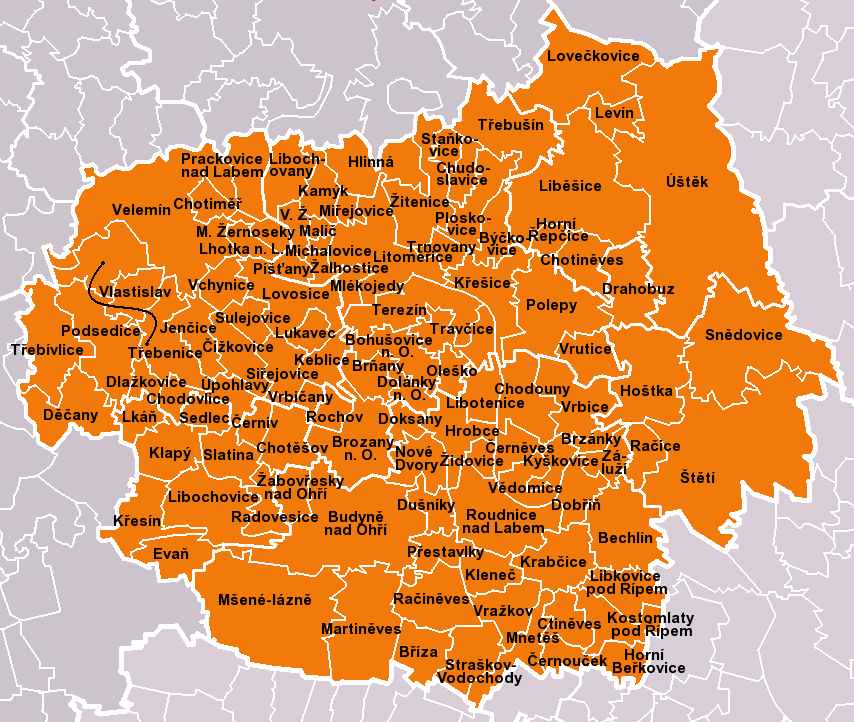
- Coordinates: 50°29′N 14°14′E
- Country: Czech Republic
- Region: Ústí nad Labem
- Capital: Litoměřice

Area
  - Total: 1,032.41 km^{2} (398.62 sq mi)

Population (2026)
  - Total: 119,094
  - Density: 115.355/km^{2} (298.769/sq mi)
- Time zone: UTC+1 (CET)
  - Summer (DST): UTC+2 (CEST)
- Municipalities: 105
- * Towns: 11
- * Market towns: 2

Litoměřice District (Czech: okres Litoměřice) is a district in the Ústí nad Labem Region of the Czech Republic. Its capital is the town of Litoměřice.

== Administrative division ==
Litoměřice District is divided into three administrative districts of municipalities with extended competence: Litoměřice, Lovosice and Roudnice nad Labem.

=== List of municipalities ===
Towns are marked in bold and market towns in italics:

Bechlín - Bohušovice nad Ohří - Bříza - Brňany - Brozany nad Ohří - Brzánky - Budyně nad Ohří - Býčkovice - Ctiněves - Černěves - Černiv - Černouček - Chodouny - Chodovlice - Chotěšov - Chotiměř - Chotiněves - Chudoslavice - Čížkovice - Děčany - Dlažkovice - Dobříň - Doksany - Dolánky nad Ohří - Drahobuz - Dušníky - Evaň - Hlinná - Horní Beřkovice - Horní Řepčice - Hoštka - Hrobce - Jenčice - Kamýk - Keblice - Klapý - Kleneč - Kostomlaty pod Řípem - Krabčice - Křesín - Křešice - Kyškovice - Levín - Lhotka nad Labem - Liběšice - Libkovice pod Řípem - Libochovany - Libochovice - Libotenice - Litoměřice - Lkáň - Lovečkovice - Lovosice - Lukavec - Malé Žernoseky - Malíč - Martiněves - Michalovice - Miřejovice - Mlékojedy - Mnetěš - Mšené-lázně - Nové Dvory - Oleško - Píšťany - Ploskovice - Podsedice - Polepy - Prackovice nad Labem - Přestavlky - Račice - Račiněves - Radovesice - Rochov - Roudnice nad Labem - Sedlec - Siřejovice - Slatina - Snědovice - Staňkovice - Štětí - Straškov-Vodochody - Sulejovice - Terezín - Travčice - Třebenice - Trnovany - Třebívlice - Třebušín - Úpohlavy - Úštěk - Vchynice - Vědomice - Velemín - Velké Žernoseky - Vlastislav - Vražkov - Vrbičany - Vrbice - Vrutice - Záluží - Žabovřesky nad Ohří - Žalhostice - Židovice - Žitenice

== Geography ==
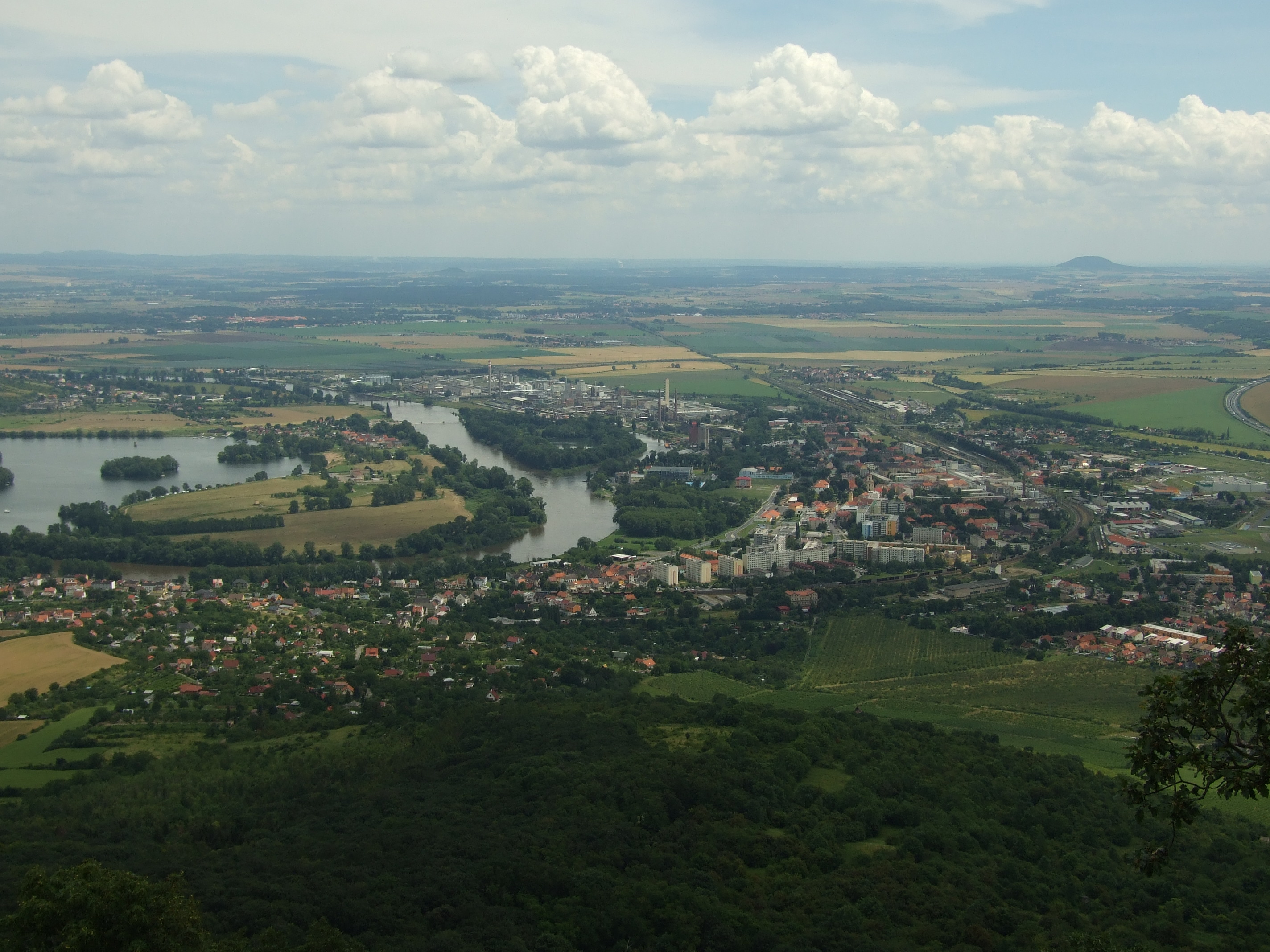
Landscape around Lovosice

Most of the territory is flat and has an agricultural character, but the north is hilly. The territory extends into three geomorphological mesoregions: Lower Ohře Table (south), Central Bohemian Uplands (north) and Ralsko Uplands (east). The highest point of the district is the mountain Milešovka in Velemín with an elevation of 837 m (2,746 ft), the lowest point is the river bed of the Elbe in Prackovice nad Labem at 143 m (469 ft). A dominant feature of the southern part of the district is the Říp Mountain.

From the total district area of 1,032.4 km^{2} (398.6 sq mi), agricultural land occupies 731.5 km^{2} (282.4 sq mi), forests occupy 170.2 km^{2} (65.7 sq mi), and water area occupies 18.8 km^{2} (7.3 sq mi). Forests cover 16.5% of the district's area.

The most important rivers are the Elbe and its tributary Ohře, which drain the entire territory. The largest body of water is Žernosecké Lake, an artificial lake created by flooding sandstone quarry. However, there are only a few bodies of water.

České středohoří is a protected landscape area that extends into the district.

== Demographics ==
Historical population

Year	Pop.	±%
1869	109,969	—
1880	122,987	+11.8%
1890	124,945	+1.6%
1900	131,418	+5.2%
1910	141,412	+7.6%

Year	Pop.	±%
1921	142,324	+0.6%
1930	149,917	+5.3%
1950	107,078	−28.6%
1961	115,415	+7.8%
1970	115,990	+0.5%

Year	Pop.	±%
1980	119,621	+3.1%
1991	113,883	−4.8%
2001	114,259	+0.3%
2011	117,278	+2.6%
2021	117,400	+0.1%

Source: Censuses

=== Most populous municipalities ===
Name	Population	Area (km^{2})
Litoměřice	22,627	18
Roudnice nad Labem	12,561	17
Lovosice	8,744	12
Štětí	8,536	54
Libochovice	3,375	16
Terezín	2,852	14
Úštěk	2,830	75
Bohušovice nad Ohří	2,393	9
Budyně nad Ohří	2,152	34
Třebenice	1,885	22

== Economy ==
The largest employers with headquarters in Litoměřice District and at least 500 employees are:

Economic entity	Location	Number of employees	Main activity
TRCZ	Lovosice	1,000–1,499	Manufacture of parts for motor vehicles
Horní Beřkovice Psychiatric Hospital	Horní Beřkovice	500–999	Health care
Centrum sociální pomoci Litoměřice	Lovosice	500–999	Residential care activities
Lovochemie	Lovosice	500–999	Manufacture of fertilisers
2JCP	Račice	500–999	Manufacture of metal structures
Mondi Štětí	Štětí	500–999	Manufacture of paper
CS-BETON	Velké Žernoseky	500–999	Manufacture of concrete products for construction purposes

== Transport ==
The D8 motorway from Prague to Ústí nad Labem runs across the district.

== Sights ==
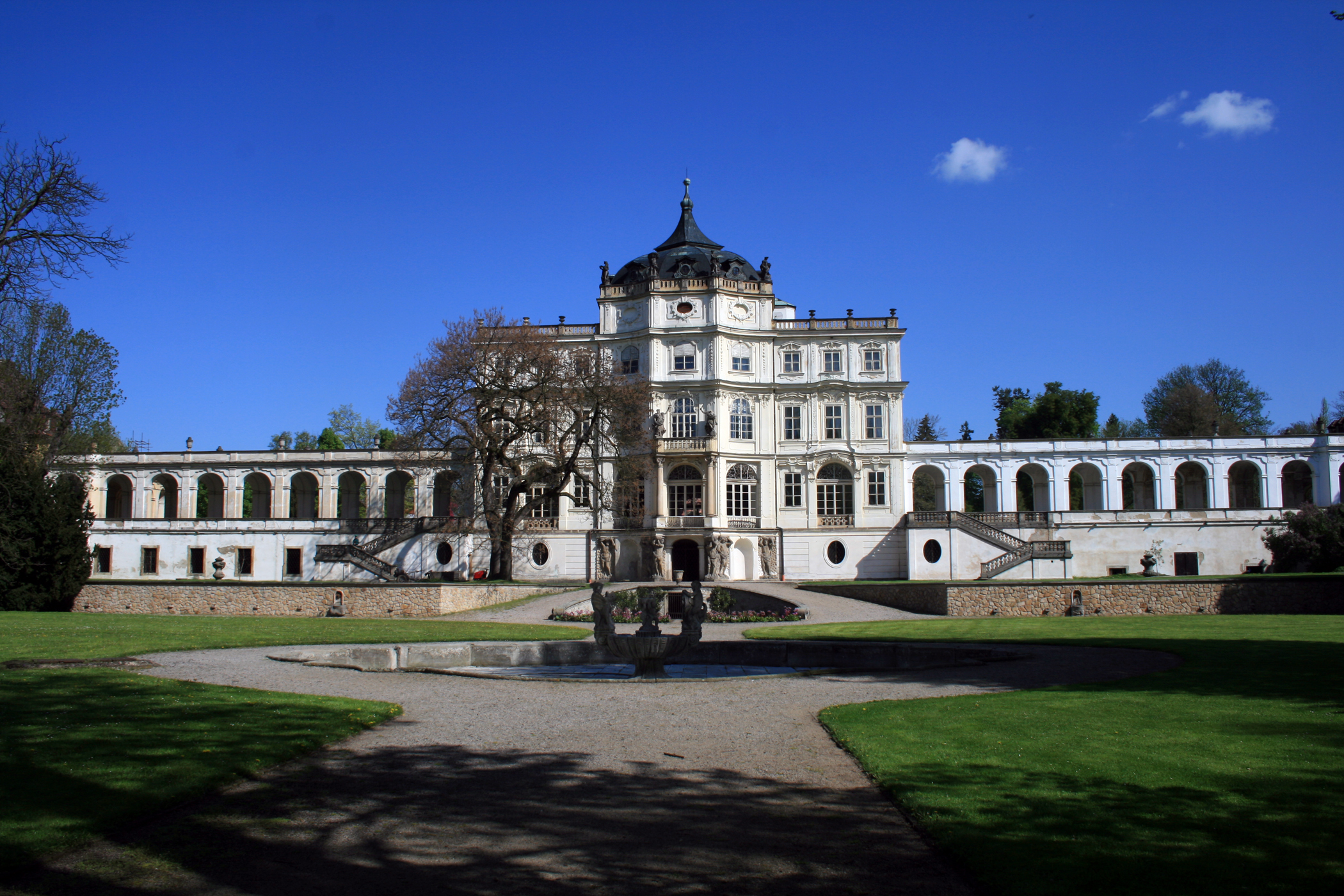
Ploskovice Castle

The most important monuments in the district, protected as national cultural monuments, are:

- Říp with the Rotunda of Saint George
- Small Fortress in Terezín
- Libochovice Castle
- Ploskovice Castle
- Augustinian monastery in Roudnice nad Labem
- Old Town Hall in Litoměřice

The best-preserved settlements, protected as monument reservations and monument zones, are:

- Litoměřice (monument reservation)
- Terezín (monument reservation)
- Úštěk (monument reservation)
- Starý Týn (monument reservation)
- Budyně nad Ohří
- Roudnice nad Labem
- Brocno
- Chotiněves
- Dolní Nezly
- Rašovice
- Slatina
- Soběnice
- Srdov

The most visited tourist destination is the Terezín Memorial.
