= Píšťany =

- Municipality
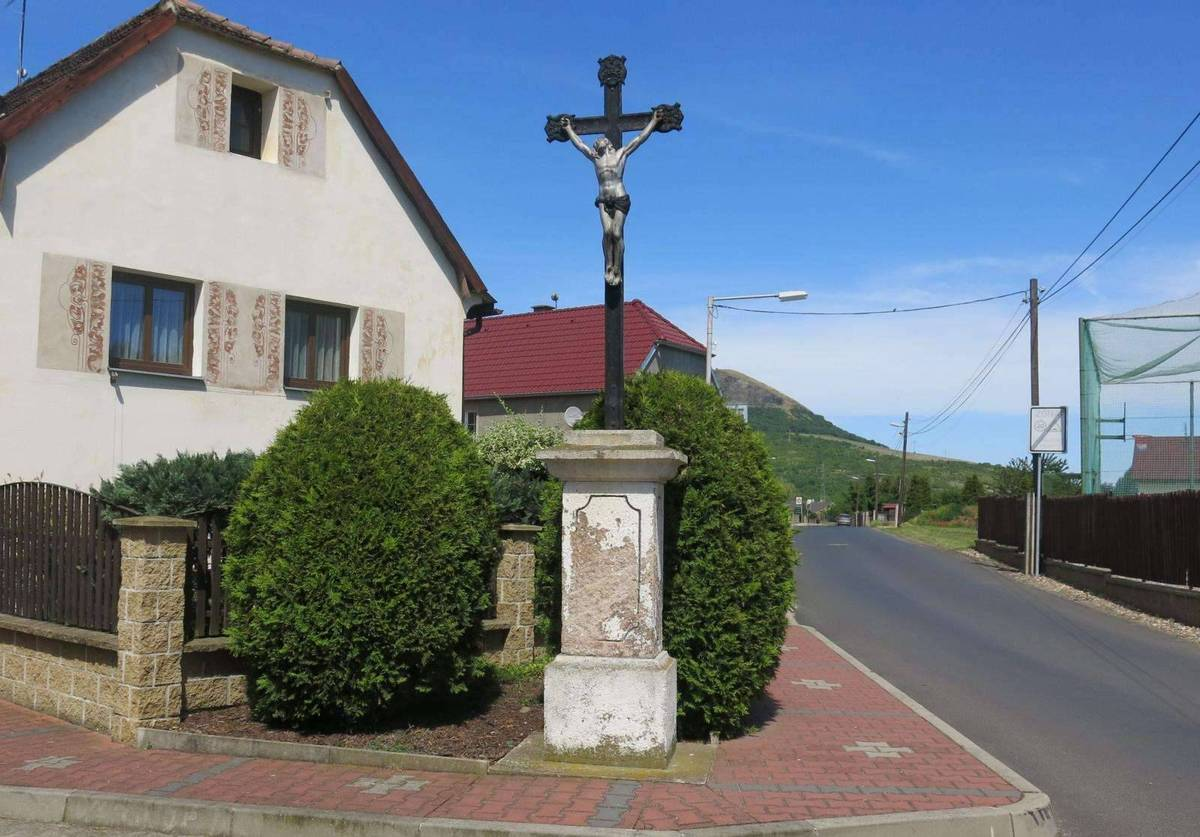
- Cross in the centre of Píšťany

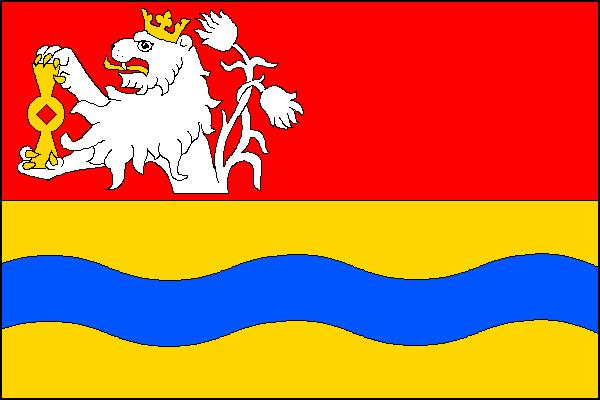
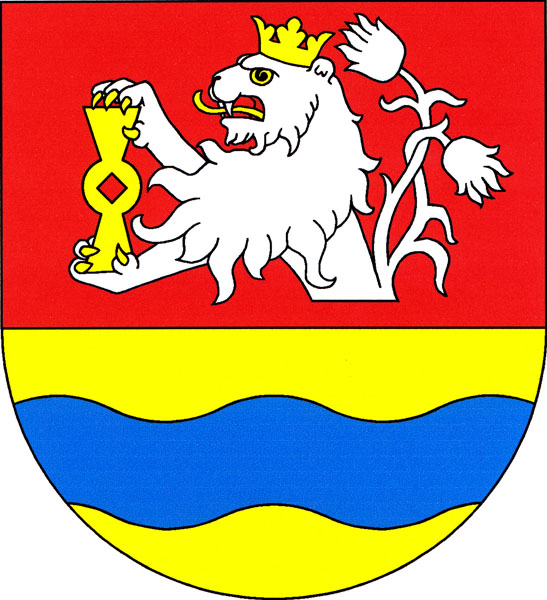
- Flag Coat of arms

- Location in the Czech Republic
- Coordinates: 50°31′9″N 14°4′9″E
- Country: Czech Republic
- Region: Ústí nad Labem
- District: Litoměřice
- First mentioned: 1057

Area
  - Total: 2.81 km^{2} (1.08 sq mi)
- Elevation: 140 m (460 ft)

Population (2026-01-01)
  - Total: 219
  - Density: 77.9/km^{2} (202/sq mi)
- Time zone: UTC+1 (CET)
  - Summer (DST): UTC+2 (CEST)
- Postal code: 411 01
- Website: www.pistany.cz

Píšťany is a municipality and village in Litoměřice District in the Ústí nad Labem Region of the Czech Republic. It has about 200 inhabitants.

Píšťany lies approximately 4 kilometres (2 mi) west of Litoměřice, 15 km (9 mi) south of Ústí nad Labem, and 55 km (34 mi) north-west of Prague.

== Demographics ==
Historical population
Year	Pop.	±%
1869	193	—
1880	210	+8.8%
1890	188	−10.5%
1900	198	+5.3%
1910	203	+2.5%
1921	204	+0.5%
1930	446	+118.6%
1950	256	−42.6%
1961	292	+14.1%
1970	269	−7.9%
1980	215	−20.1%
1991	133	−38.1%
2001	177	+33.1%
2011	225	+27.1%
2021	207	−8.0%
Source: Censuses
