= Libotenice =

- Municipality
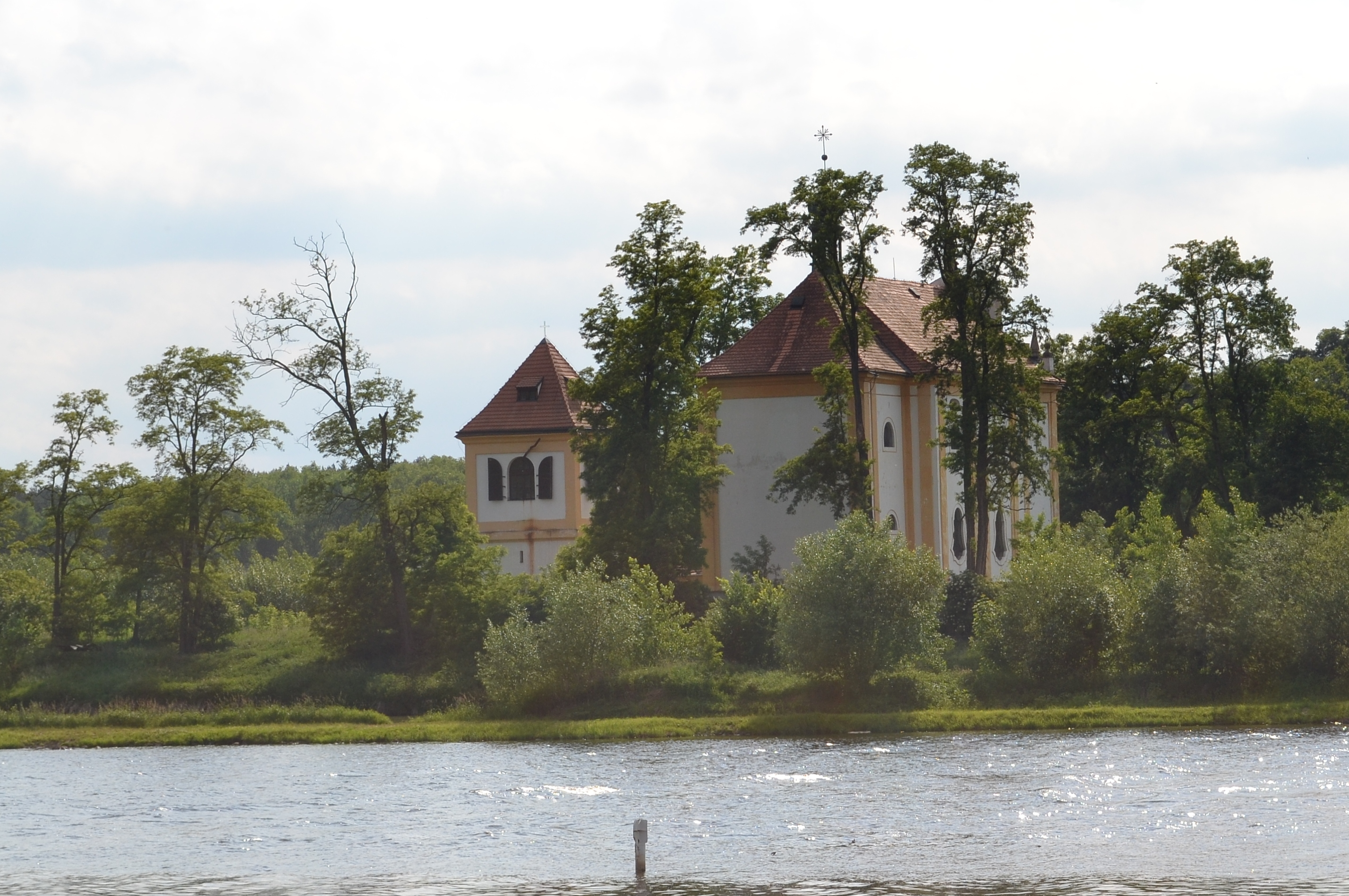
- Church of Saint Catherine

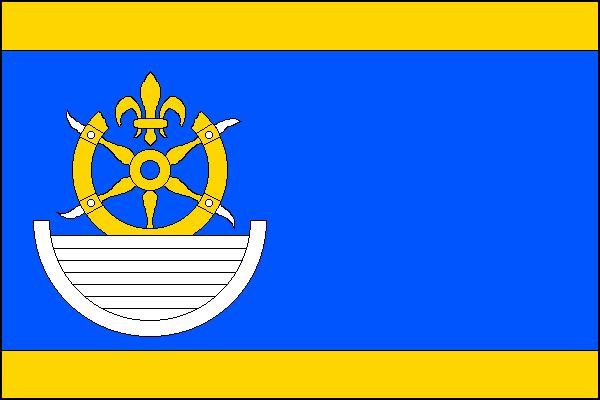
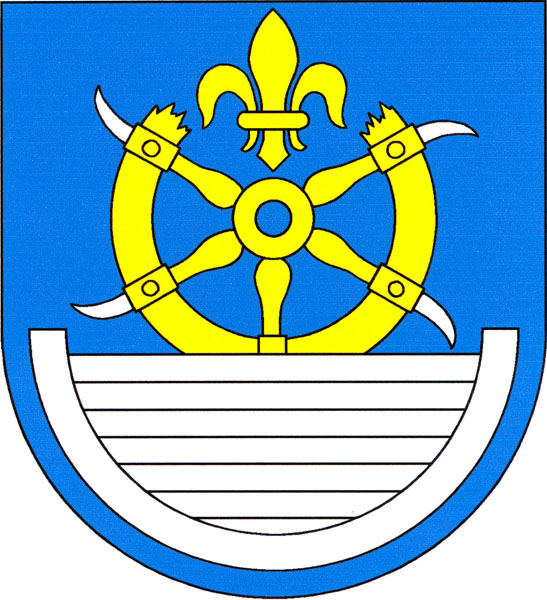
- Flag Coat of arms

- Location in the Czech Republic
- Coordinates: 50°28′37″N 14°13′46″E
- Country: Czech Republic
- Region: Ústí nad Labem
- District: Litoměřice
- First mentioned: 1226

Area
  - Total: 5.72 km^{2} (2.21 sq mi)
- Elevation: 151 m (495 ft)

Population (2026-01-01)
  - Total: 440
  - Density: 77/km^{2} (200/sq mi)
- Time zone: UTC+1 (CET)
  - Summer (DST): UTC+2 (CEST)
- Postal code: 412 01
- Website: www.libotenice.cz

Libotenice is a municipality and village in Litoměřice District in the Ústí nad Labem Region of the Czech Republic. It has about 400 inhabitants.

Libotenice lies approximately 10 kilometres (6 mi) south-east of Litoměřice, 24 km (15 mi) south-east of Ústí nad Labem, and 46 km (29 mi) north of Prague.

== Demographics ==
Historical population
Year	Pop.	±%
1869	358	—
1880	374	+4.5%
1890	407	+8.8%
1900	467	+14.7%
1910	543	+16.3%
1921	504	−7.2%
1930	513	+1.8%
1950	381	−25.7%
1961	403	+5.8%
1970	381	−5.5%
1980	364	−4.5%
1991	408	+12.1%
2001	400	−2.0%
2011	441	+10.3%
2021	426	−3.4%
Source: Censuses
