= Chudoslavice =

- Municipality
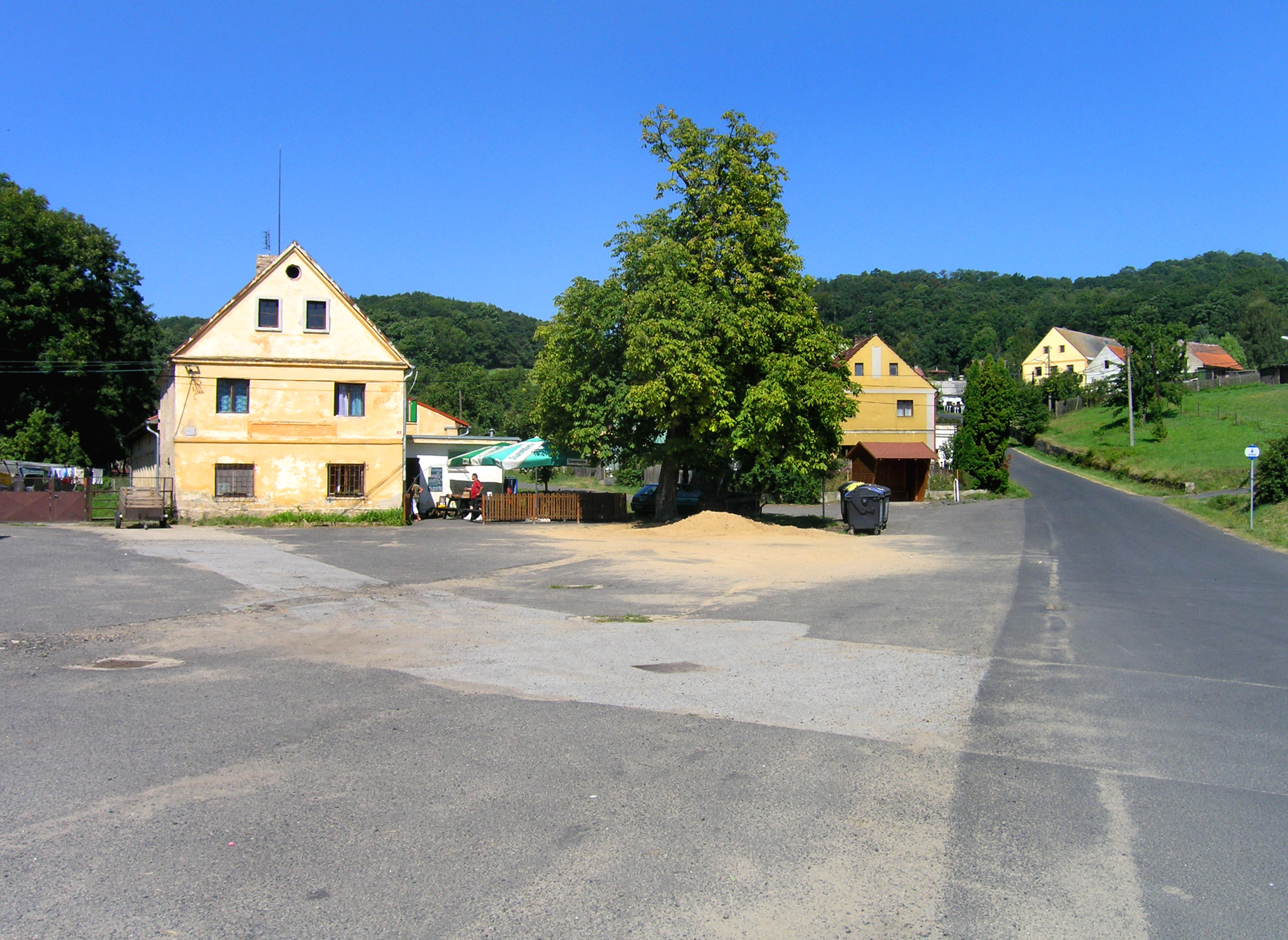
- Centre of Chudoslavice

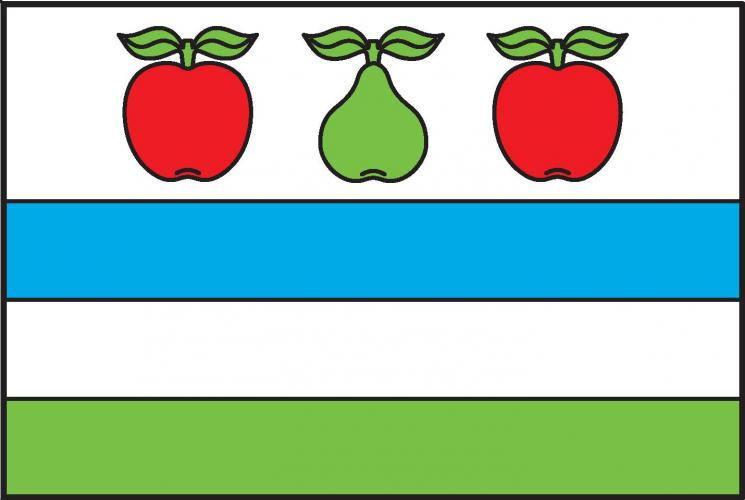
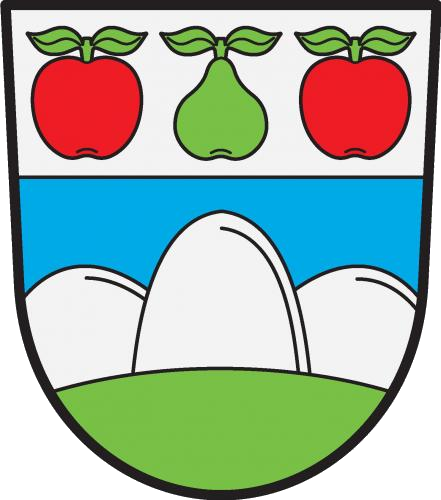
- Flag Coat of arms

- Location in the Czech Republic
- Coordinates: 50°34′59″N 14°11′14″E
- Country: Czech Republic
- Region: Ústí nad Labem
- District: Litoměřice
- First mentioned: 1545

Area
  - Total: 3.85 km^{2} (1.49 sq mi)
- Elevation: 290 m (950 ft)

Population (2026-01-01)
  - Total: 180
  - Density: 47/km^{2} (120/sq mi)
- Time zone: UTC+1 (CET)
  - Summer (DST): UTC+2 (CEST)
- Postal code: 412 01
- Website: www.chudoslavice.cz

Chudoslavice is a municipality and village in Litoměřice District in the Ústí nad Labem Region of the Czech Republic. It has about 200 inhabitants.

Chudoslavice lies approximately 8 kilometres (5 mi) north-east of Litoměřice, 14 km (9 mi) south-east of Ústí nad Labem, and 58 km (36 mi) north of Prague.

== Administrative division ==
Chudoslavice consists of two municipal parts (in brackets population according to the 2021 census):

- Chudoslavice (130)
- Myštice (46)

== Demographics ==
Historical population
Year	Pop.	±%
1869	378	—
1880	378	+0.0%
1890	361	−4.5%
1900	338	−6.4%
1910	348	+3.0%
1921	320	−8.0%
1930	299	−6.6%
1950	168	−43.8%
1961	187	+11.3%
1970	159	−15.0%
1980	150	−5.7%
1991	124	−17.3%
2001	137	+10.5%
2011	144	+5.1%
2021	176	+22.2%
Source: Censuses
