= Travčice =

- Municipality
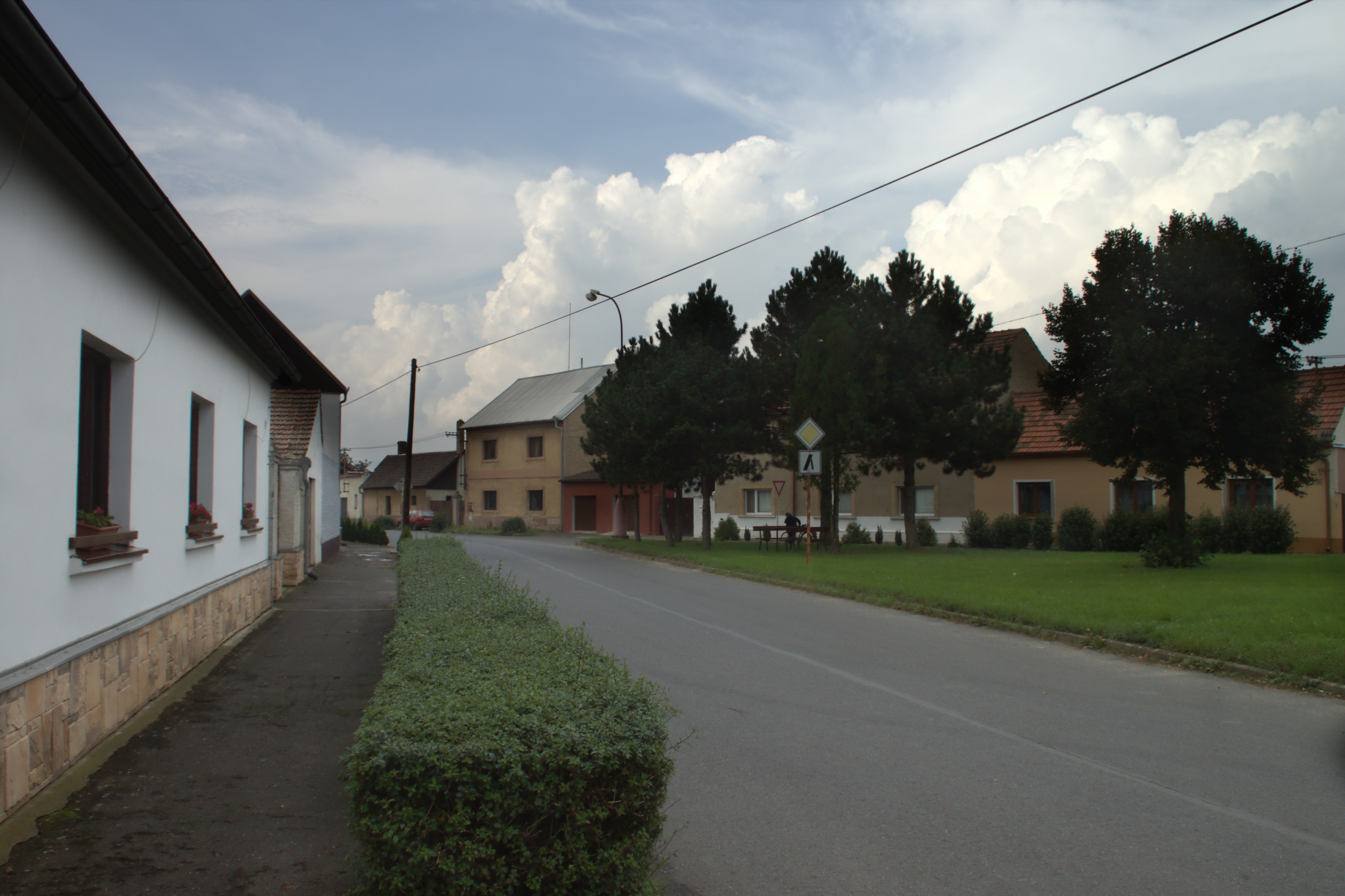
- A road in Travčice

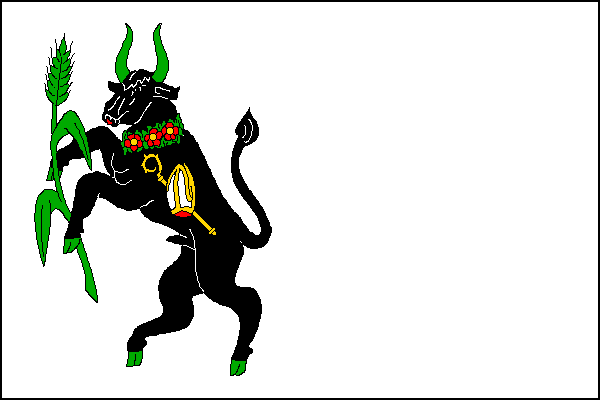
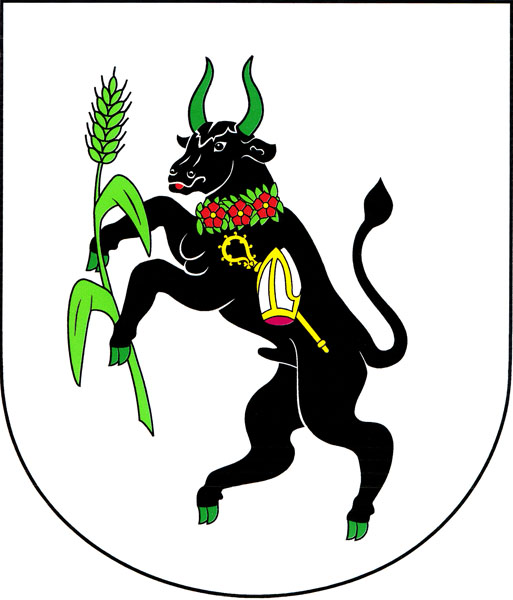
- Flag Coat of arms

- Location in the Czech Republic
- Coordinates: 50°30′12″N 14°11′24″E
- Country: Czech Republic
- Region: Ústí nad Labem
- District: Litoměřice
- First mentioned: 1239

Area
  - Total: 7.93 km^{2} (3.06 sq mi)
- Elevation: 154 m (505 ft)

Population (2026-01-01)
  - Total: 617
  - Density: 77.8/km^{2} (202/sq mi)
- Time zone: UTC+1 (CET)
  - Summer (DST): UTC+2 (CEST)
- Postal code: 412 01
- Website: www.obec-travcice.cz

Travčice is a municipality and village in Litoměřice District in the Ústí nad Labem Region of the Czech Republic. It has about 600 inhabitants.

Travčice lies approximately 7 kilometres (4 mi) south-east of Litoměřice, 21 km (13 mi) south-east of Ústí nad Labem, and 49 km (30 mi) north of Prague.

== Administrative division ==
Travčice consists of two municipal parts (in brackets population according to the 2021 census):

- Travčice (512)
- Nučničky (83)

== Demographics ==
Historical population
Year	Pop.	±%
1869	576	—
1880	617	+7.1%
1890	689	+11.7%
1900	721	+4.6%
1910	733	+1.7%
1921	680	−7.2%
1930	778	+14.4%
1950	580	−25.4%
1961	560	−3.4%
1970	555	−0.9%
1980	554	−0.2%
1991	577	+4.2%
2001	576	−0.2%
2011	583	+1.2%
2021	595	+2.1%
Source: Censuses
