= List of castles in the Ústí nad Labem Region =

This is a list of castles and chateaux located in the Ústí nad Labem Region of the Czech Republic.

== A ==
- Ahníkov Chateau

== B ==
- Benešov nad Ploučnicí Chateau
- Bílence Chateau
- Bílina Chateau
- Blansko Castle
- Blatno Chateau
- Blšany u Loun Chateau
- Boreč Chateau
- Brňany Chateau
- Brocno Chateau
- Brody Chateau
- Brtnický hrádek Castle
- Budyně nad Ohří Castle

== C ==
- Chomutov Castle
- Chrámce Chateau
- Chřibský hrádek Castle
- Červený hrádek Chateau
- Čížkovice Chateau
- Cítoliby Chateau

== D ==
- Děčín Chateau
- Dlažkovice Chateau
- Dobříčany Chateau
- Doubravská Hora Castle
- Duchcov Chateau
- Dvojhradí Chateau

== E ==
- Egerberk Castle
- Encovany Chateau

== F ==
- Falkenštejn Castle
- Fredevald Castle
- Funkštejn Castle

== H ==
- Hasištejn Castle
- Hausberk Castle
- Házmburk Castle
- Hliňany Chateau
- Hněvín Castle
- Horní Beřkovice Chateau
- Hrad na Blešenském vrchu Castle
- Hrádek u Úštěku Castle
- Hrdly Chateau

== J ==
- Janov Chateau
- Jezeří Chateau
- Jílové Chateau

== K ==
- Kadaň Castle
- Kalich Castle
- Kamenice Castle
- Kamýk (u Litoměřic) Castle
- Kaštice Chateau
- Kyjovský hrádek Castle
- Klášterec nad Ohří Chateau
- Konojedy Chateau
- Kostomlaty pod Milešovkou Castle
- Kostomlaty pod Milešovkou Chateau
- Košťany Chateau
- Košťálov Castle
- Krásné Březno Chateau
- Krásný Buk Castle
- Krásný Dvůr Chateau
- Krásný Les Chateau
- Krupka Castle
- Kryry Castle
- Křečov Castle
- Křemýž Chateau
- Kyšperk Castle

== L ==
- Leština Castle
- Levín Castle
- Libčeves Chateau
- Liběšice Chateau, Liběšice, Litoměřice District
- Libochovany Chateau
- Libochovice Chateau
- Libočany Chateau
- Libořice Chateau
- Libouchec Chateau
- Lichtenwald Chateau
- Lipno Chateau
- Lipová - starý zámek Chateau
- Lipová Chateau
- Litoměřice Castle
- Litvínov Chateau
- Litýš Castle
- Líčkov Chateau
- Lovosice Chateau
- Lukavec Chateau
- Lužec Chateau

== M ==
- Měcholupy Chateau
- Milčeves Chateau
- Milešov Chateau
- Milošice Chateau
- Mšené Chateau

== N ==
- Najštejn Castle
- Nepomyšl Chateau
- Neznámý hrad u Albrechtic Castle
- Nový Hrad Chateau
- Nový Žeberk Castle

== O ==
- Oltářík Castle
- Opárno Castle
- Ostrý Castle
- Ostrý Castle

== P ==
- Panenský Týnec Chateau
- Panna Castle
- Paradies Castle
- Perštejn Castle
- Peruc Chateau
- Petrohrad Castle
- Petrohrad Chateau
- Ploskovice Chateau
- Pnětluky Chateau
- Postoloprty Chateau
- Pravda Castle

== R ==
- Roudnice nad Labem Chateau
- Rybňany Chateau
- Rýzmburk Castle

== S ==
- Schönbuch Castle
- Skalka Castle
- Skalka Chateau
- Snědovice Chateau
- Sokolí hnízdo Chateau
- Starý Žeberk Castle
- Stekník Chateau
- Střekov Castle
- Sukorady Chateau
- Světec Chateau
- Šauenštejn Castle
- Šebín Castle
- Škrle Chateau
- Šluknov Chateau
- Štern Chateau
- Šumburk Castle

== T ==
- Teplice Chateau
- Tolštejn Castle
- Toužetín Chateau
- Trmice Chateau
- Třebívlice Chateau
- Třebušín Chateau
- Tuchlov Chateau
- Tuchořice Chateau

== U ==
- Úštěk Castle

== V ==
- Varta Castle
- Velké Březno Chateau
- Velké Žernoseky Chateau
- Velký Újezd Chateau
- Vidhostice Chateau
- Vinařice Castle
- Vintířov - Nový zámek Chateau
- Vintířov - Starý zámek Chateau
- Vlčí Hrádek Castle
- Vrabinec Castle
- Vrbičany Chateau
- Vršovice Chateau

== Z ==
- Zahořany Chateau
- Želeč Chateau
- Žerotín Castle
- Žitenice Chateau

== See also ==
- List of castles in the Czech Republic
- List of castles in Europe
- List of castles
