= Vesce =

Vesce may refer to:

== Places in the Czech Republic ==
- Vesce (Tábor District), a municipality and village in the South Bohemian Region
- Vesce, a village and part of Budíškovice in the South Bohemian Region
- Vesce, a hamlet and part of Horní Stropnice in the South Bohemian Region
- Vesce, a village and part of Krabčice in the Ústí nad Labem Region
- Vesce, a village and part of Moravské Budějovice in the Vysočina Region
- Vesce, a village and part of Počátky in the Vysočina Region
- Vesce, a village and part of Týn nad Vltavou in the South Bohemian Region
- Vesce, a village and part of Vroutek in the Ústí nad Labem Region

== People ==
- Ryan Vesce (born 1982), American ice hockey player
