= Vrbičany =

Vrbičany may refer to places in the Czech Republic:

- Vrbičany (Kladno District), a municipality and village in the Central Bohemian Region
- Vrbičany (Litoměřice District), a municipality and village in the Ústí nad Labem Region
