= Kalich =

Remains of the gate tower leading into the inner castle

Kalich (Czech: Kalich, German: Kelchberg) is a ruined castle above the village of Třebušín in the Litoměřice District of the Ústí nad Labem Region in the Czech Republic. It stands on the summit of the hill of the same name in the Central Bohemian Uplands, at an elevation of approximately 530 metres. The castle was founded in 1421 by the Hussite military commander Jan Žižka. After the Hussite Wars, it passed through the hands of several owners but had been abandoned by the end of the 15th century. Its remains have been protected as a cultural monument since 1964.

== History ==
Archaeological research has ruled out existence of an earlier fortification on the hilltop, although such a structure had been proposed by historians including August Sedláček, Rudolf Anděl and Tomáš Durdík. The research also found no evidence of the round Bergfried described by František Alexandr Heber. Heber suggested that the tower widened in successive stages towards the top and thus resembled a chalice, a symbol associated with the Hussite movement. This interpretation is not supported by the archaeological evidence.

=== The castle during the Hussite Wars ===
The first written mention of Kalich dates to 1421 and appears in the Hussite Chronicle by Lawrence of Březová. Jan Žižka founded the castle as his family seat shortly before the Hussites began their siege of Litoměřice.

One of the castle's purposes was to protect the Hussite forces besieging Litoměřice from attacks by Catholic nobles in northwestern Bohemia, particularly members of the Wartenberg family. Construction began in May 1421 and progressed rapidly. In September of the same year, the castle was unsuccessfully besieged by Sigismund of Děčín, a member of the Wartenberg family. From 1422 onwards, Jan Žižka used the territorial designation of Kalich.

Probably during the siege of Kalich, Sigismund of Wartenberg founded nearby Panna Castle on a neighbouring hill. Another castle, Litýš Castle, was established sometime between 1423 and 1427. These two Catholic strongholds in close proximity posed a threat to the Hussites. They unsuccessfully attempted to capture Panna in 1422, but Žižka's forces finally took it after a month-long siege in 1423.

Jan Žižka died in 1424, and his brother Jaroslav of Kalich probably became the castle's lord. After Jaroslav's death around 1428, ownership passed to Žižka's sister Anežka and another female relative, Anna. Few details about their lives have survived.

In 1434, Anežka unsuccessfully brought a lawsuit concerning a house in Prague's New Town. The castle's garrison is believed to have participated in smaller military operations in northwestern Bohemia and probably also took part in the Battle of Ústí nad Labem in 1426.

In 1437, Sigismund of Wartenberg captured and damaged Panna Castle. He probably captured Kalich as well. Emperor Sigismund of Luxembourg subsequently purchased or exchanged the two castles with him and ordered their demolition. He granted the estate of Býčkovice as a pledge to Heník of Valdštejn.

What happened next is unclear. Heník of Valdštejn apparently resisted the emperor's order and refused to demolish Kalich. He allied himself with Jan Řitka of Bezdědice, who may have sheltered Žižka's sister Anežka at the castle after the Battle of Lipany and may also have commanded its defenders in 1437. Shortly before his death, Emperor Sigismund sent a regional levy against them under Zbyněk Zajíc of Hazmburk, captain of the Litoměřice region. The force besieged Kalich but failed to capture it.

=== The castle after the Hussite Wars ===
After 1438, the castle came into the possession of William of Ilburg. The precise date and circumstances of the transfer are unknown. William certainly held it by 1444, when he used the designation indicating that he resided at Kalich. He substantially rebuilt the castle, although he probably regarded it primarily as an important military stronghold rather than a comfortable residence. William later opposed King George of Poděbrady.

There is no surviving written evidence of the castle's capture, but it is assumed that Kalich was taken by, or surrendered without a fight to, the royal army that captured nearby Roudnice and Helfenburk Castle in 1467.

Soon afterwards, King George granted the castle as a pledge to Petr Kaplíř of Sulevice. Kaplíř resided mainly at Vimperk Castle, and Kalich served him only as a fortress. Between 1471 and 1488, the castle passed by unknown means to Ješek Svojanovský of Boskovice. He did not reside there and probably failed to maintain it, although it remained habitable at that time.

In 1489, Václav of Wartenberg incorporated Kalich into his Litýš estate. However, when Václav exchanged property with his cousin Kryštof in 1532, the castle was no longer mentioned in the agreement. It had apparently ceased to be an active residence by then.

=== Modern history ===
In 1868, a proposal was made to remove a foundation stone from the castle for use in the construction of the National Theatre in Prague. The captain of the Litoměřice region prohibited this. The stone was instead transported to Lounky, and in 1893 it was used as the tombstone of the politician Václav Kratochvíl in Krabčice. Kratochvíl had initiated the original proposal.

In the 1880s, a viewing pavilion with a restaurant was built at the castle. It closed soon after 1886 because of the small number of visitors.

Since 2015, the castle has been leased to the association Hrady Českého středohoří, which maintains the ruins. In 2017, archaeological work included the restoration of a bastion built from dry-laid stones. An admission fee has been charged to visit the ruins since 2024.

== Description ==
The approach to the castle probably led from Třebušín towards Zababeč and Hlupice, following a route similar to that of the present-day paved road. At an uncertain point, a path branched off and climbed the eastern and northeastern slopes to the northern saddle of the hill, from where it entered the castle's first section. There is also less conclusive evidence for a route along the western slope.

=== Outer defences ===
The first section of the castle survives mainly as earthworks. Its defences consisted of an outer rampart and ditch along the eastern and northwestern sides. In the northwest, the ditch is approximately two metres wide and half a metre deep. A level area in the northern part contains slight remains of a sunken structure measuring at least 3.7 by 3 metres. This first section was a lightly fortified outwork intended to protect the point where the access routes converged.

The path continued to a second gate, situated where a narrow ridge connecting the northern bastion of the outer defences meets the rocky summit. This second section consisted of a polygonal bastion in the northern part of the castle and a narrow connecting corridor. Together, these features allowed the access route to be monitored and defended.

The bastion survives as a raised, approximately ten-sided mound faced with dry-laid stones. Its entire body is made of stone, and the mound measures approximately twelve metres in diameter at the top. A superstructure of timber and stones laid without mortar originally stood on this artificial mound. The access corridor narrows to about five metres and is protected on both sides by ramparts approximately three metres wide.

=== Inner castle ===
Above the outer defences lies the main castle, arranged across several different levels. An outer defensive line connected to the second gate protected the northwestern side of the core. It consisted of a wall at least 3.7 metres thick in its surviving form, with a ditch on the inner side. Only the earthwork of the wall remains. Similar outer defences protected the southeastern side of the core.

The inner castle was entered through a further sequence of three gates. The third gate survives only as slight traces. Beyond it, the path ran along the eastern side of a rocky outcrop and was bounded on the other side by a wall approximately one metre thick, of which only a small amount survives. Its stones were bonded with earth rather than mortar. Archaeological evidence indicates that a berm with a low parapet wall stood in front of it. After about twenty metres, the path narrowed at the presumed site of the fourth gate and continued towards the fifth gate.

The fifth gate is partially preserved. It had a rectangular ground plan measuring 8.3 by 6.7 metres and was built of local trachyte using lime mortar, with occasional bricks. Its single entrance was approximately 1.9 metres wide. A small surviving fragment of the gate building indicates that a now-vanished wall extended from it along the eastern side of the castle core.

A short section of wall is better preserved. It extended from the northern corner of the gate and curved around the edge of the northern rock outcrop, where historical descriptions placed a round keep. The circular depression visible in the rock is not, however, the remains of a tower. Archaeological interpretation instead identifies a rectangular building measuring 7.8 by 5.6 metres. It stood on the remains of an older structure partly built of small gravel.

Three rocky outcrops define the inner castle: northern, western and southwestern. A structure on the southwestern outcrop has been interpreted as a square residential tower measuring 13.3 by 8.9 metres. A partition divided its ground floor into two rooms. The surviving circular foundation in this area belongs to a gazebo built in the late 19th century, rather than to the medieval tower.

A palace stood in the central part of the castle core, between the northern and western outcrops. Its most prominent surviving feature is part of a vaulted cellar, which was modified in the 19th century and used to store drinks. The palace's external dimensions were approximately 34 by 9 metres. A well or cistern stood to its north, protected on the northern side by a substantial wall. Slight remains of two other buildings between the gate and the palace probably date from the 19th century.

=== Construction techniques ===
The remains do not permit a precise reconstruction of the castle's original appearance. Its defences were based on earthworks with an outer sloping face of dry-laid stones and an inner vertical face. The stones may have been bonded with earth, although the ramparts often survive only as loose stone deposits.

The use of stones without mortar increased the defences' resistance to bombardment by firearms. A timber structure, probably of box-frame or chamber construction, was erected on the stone lower section. The lower part was probably not strong enough to support a stone parapet, while a conventional palisade would have been difficult to anchor securely.

Similar defensive techniques were used at several other castles, including Himlštejn Castle, Panna Castle, Oltářík Castle, Rýzmburk Castle and Ostrý Castle.

== See also ==
- List of castles in the Ústí nad Labem Region
