= Pnětluky =

- Municipality
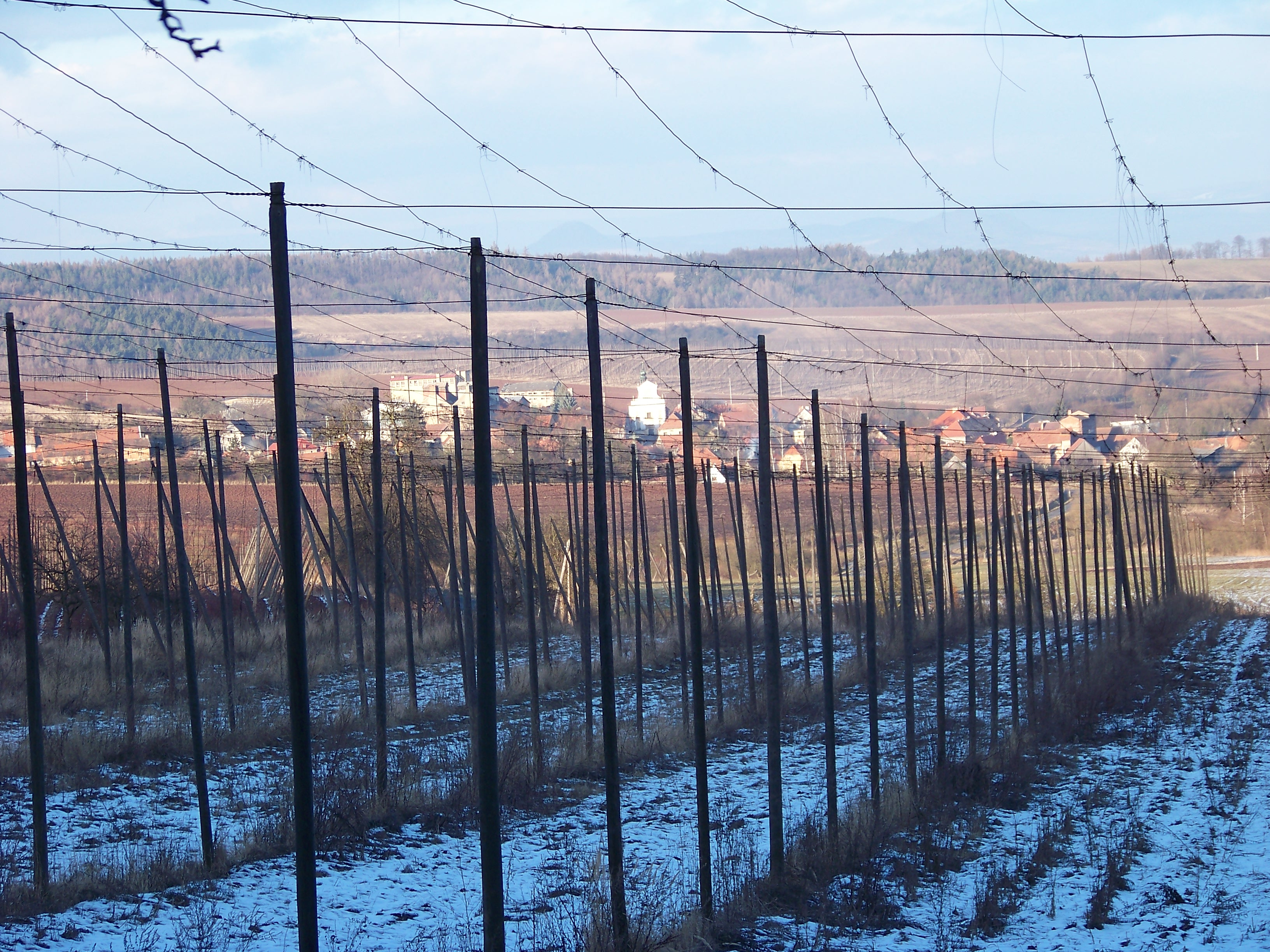
- View towards Pnětluky through a hop garden

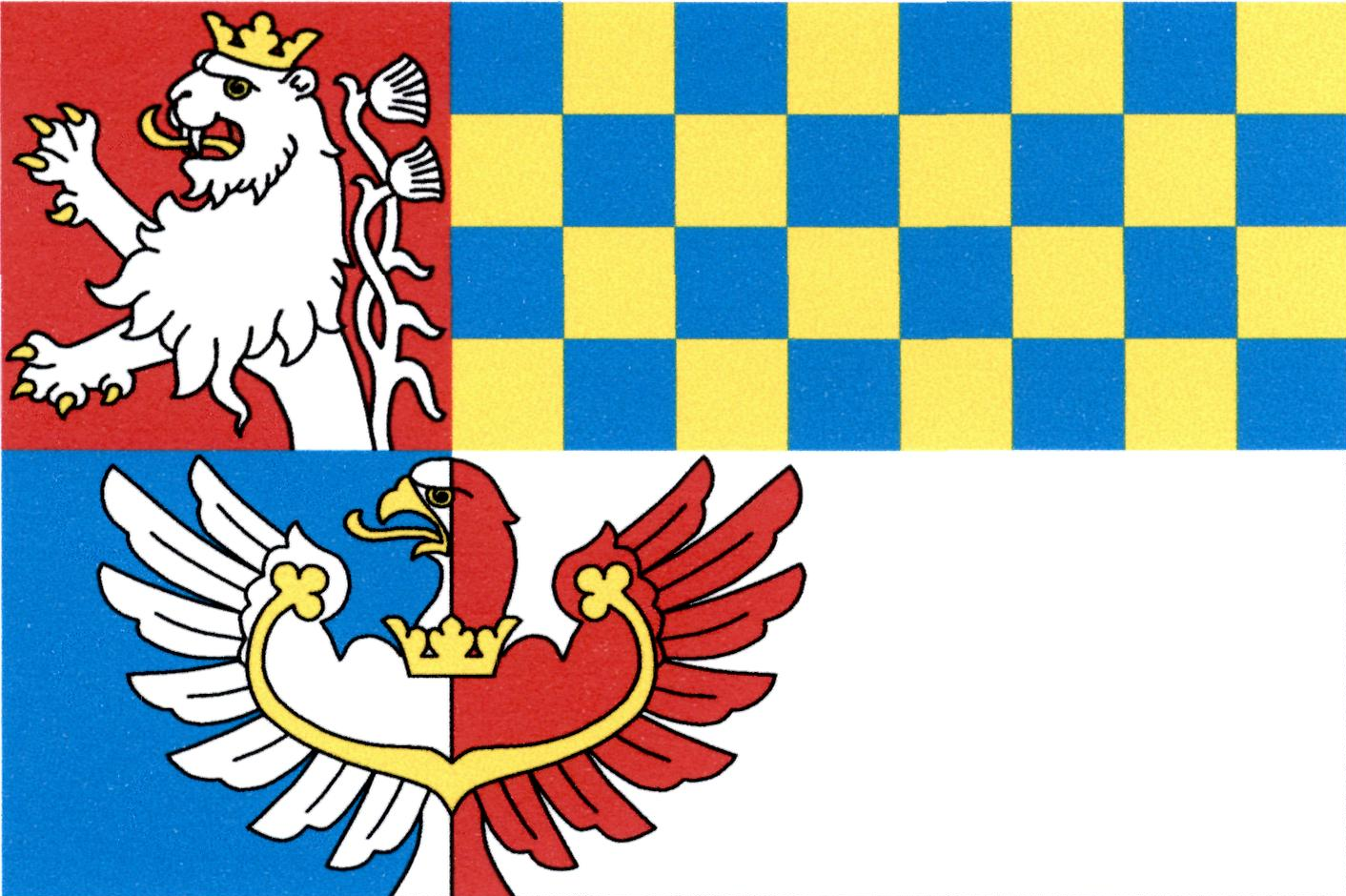
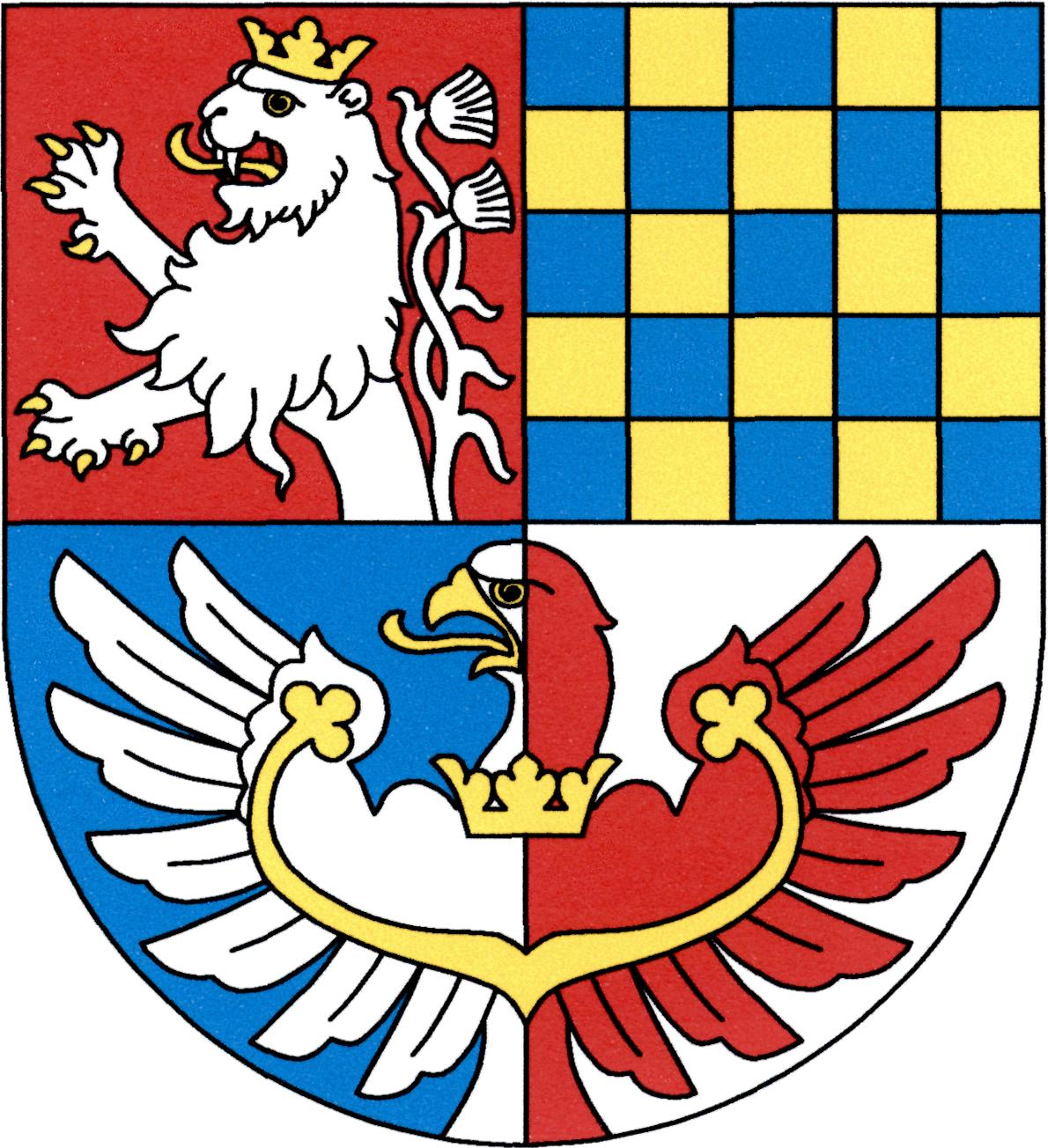
- Flag Coat of arms

- Location in the Czech Republic
- Coordinates: 50°15′1″N 13°42′14″E
- Country: Czech Republic
- Region: Ústí nad Labem
- District: Louny
- First mentioned: 1250

Area
  - Total: 14.74 km^{2} (5.69 sq mi)
- Elevation: 335 m (1,099 ft)

Population (2026-01-01)
  - Total: 367
  - Density: 24.9/km^{2} (64.5/sq mi)
- Time zone: UTC+1 (CET)
  - Summer (DST): UTC+2 (CEST)
- Postal code: 440 01
- Website: www.pnetluky.cz

Pnětluky (until 1923 Netluky; German: Netluk bei Laun) is a municipality and village in Louny District in the Ústí nad Labem Region of the Czech Republic. It has about 400 inhabitants.

== Administrative division ==
Pnětluky consists of two municipal parts (in brackets population according to the 2021 census):

- Pnětluky (209)
- Konětopy (141)

== Etymology ==
The name Pnětluky is derived from the Old Czech term pnětluk, referring to a person who "beat the trunks hard". The name Konětopy means 'drowning the horses' and was likely used mockingly.

== Geography ==
Pnětluky is located about 13 kilometres (8 mi) southwest of Louny and 49 km (30 mi) northwest of Prague. It lies in the Džbán range. The highest point is the hill Pravda at 484 m (1,588 ft) above sea level. The stream Pnětlucký potok flows through the municipality.

== History ==
The first written mention of Pnětluky is from 1250; Konětopy was first mentioned in 1357. The first fortress was established here in the 14th century, but in 1466, it was already abandoned. In the 15th century, Pnětluky was owned by members of the Kolowrat family. They had built the Pravda Castle and established the Pravda estate, which included Pnětluky and Konětopy.

In 1523, the estate was bought by the Lobkowicz family. They had a new fort built in Pnětluky, which has been preserved to this day. During the Thirty Years' War, the village was devastated, including a church from the mid-14th century. The Pravda estate was then merged with Divec and later with Cítoliby. From 1802 to the 20th century, the Cítoliby estate was property of the Schwarzenberg family. Since the first half of the 19th century, Konětopy has been known for growing hops.

== Demographics ==
Historical population

Year	Pop.	±%
1869	787	—
1880	865	+9.9%
1890	928	+7.3%
1900	960	+3.4%
1910	964	+0.4%

Year	Pop.	±%
1921	984	+2.1%
1930	873	−11.3%
1950	621	−28.9%
1961	549	−11.6%
1970	490	−10.7%

Year	Pop.	±%
1980	416	−15.1%
1991	330	−20.7%
2001	325	−1.5%
2011	323	−0.6%
2021	350	+8.4%

Source: Censuses

== Economy ==
Pnětluky is located in an area known for growing the Saaz hops.

== Transport ==
The village of Konětopy is located on the railway line Most–Rakovník.

== Sights ==
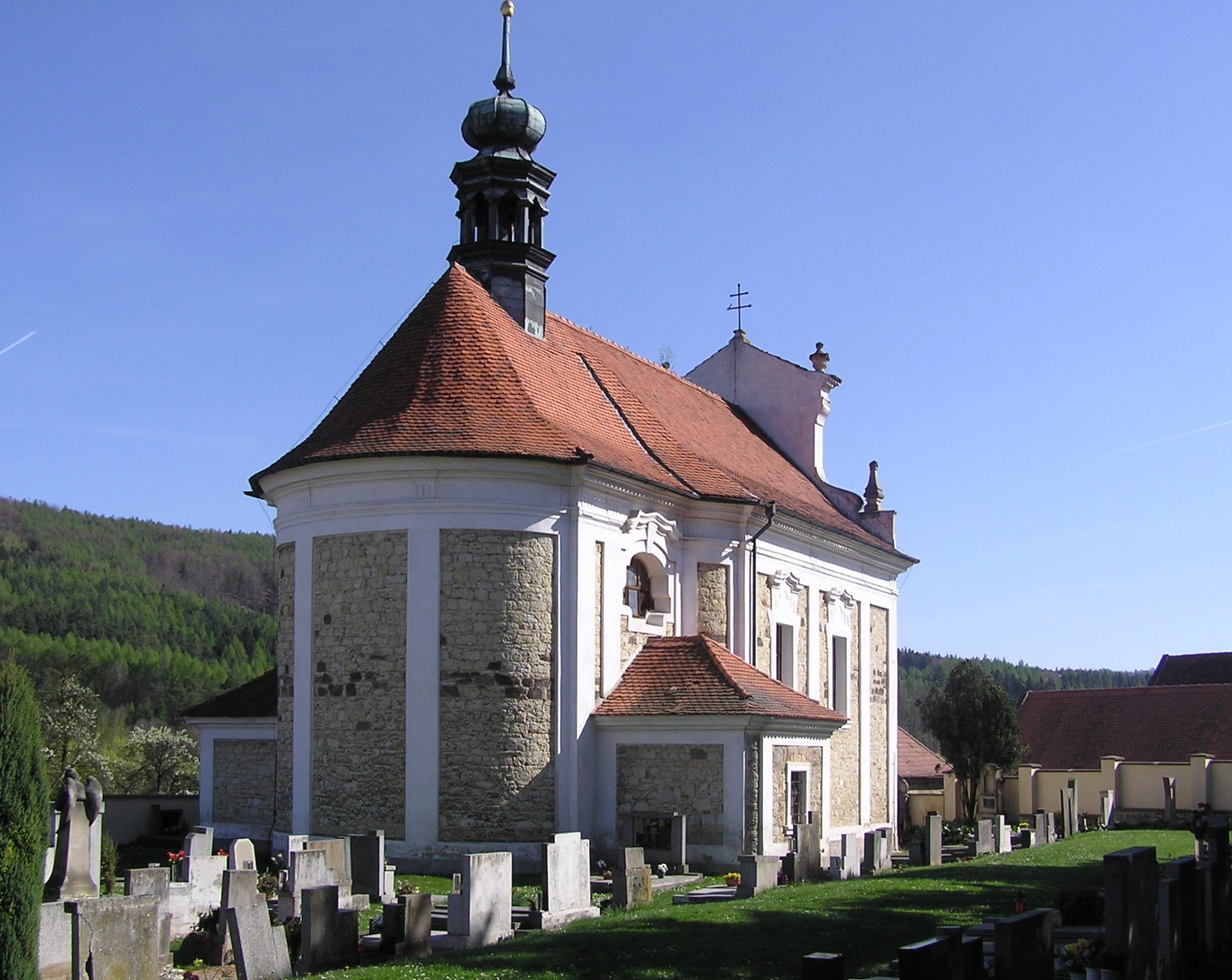
Church of Saint Matthew

Remains of the Pravda Castle are located on the eponymous hill above the village. It ceased to be an aristocratic residence in the 16th century. It has been a tourist destination since the 18th century and is used for social and cultural purposes.

The Church of Saint Matthew is a late Baroque building from 1765.
