= Duchcov Chateau =

National monument of the Czech Republic

Coordinates: 50°36′8″N 13°44′39″E

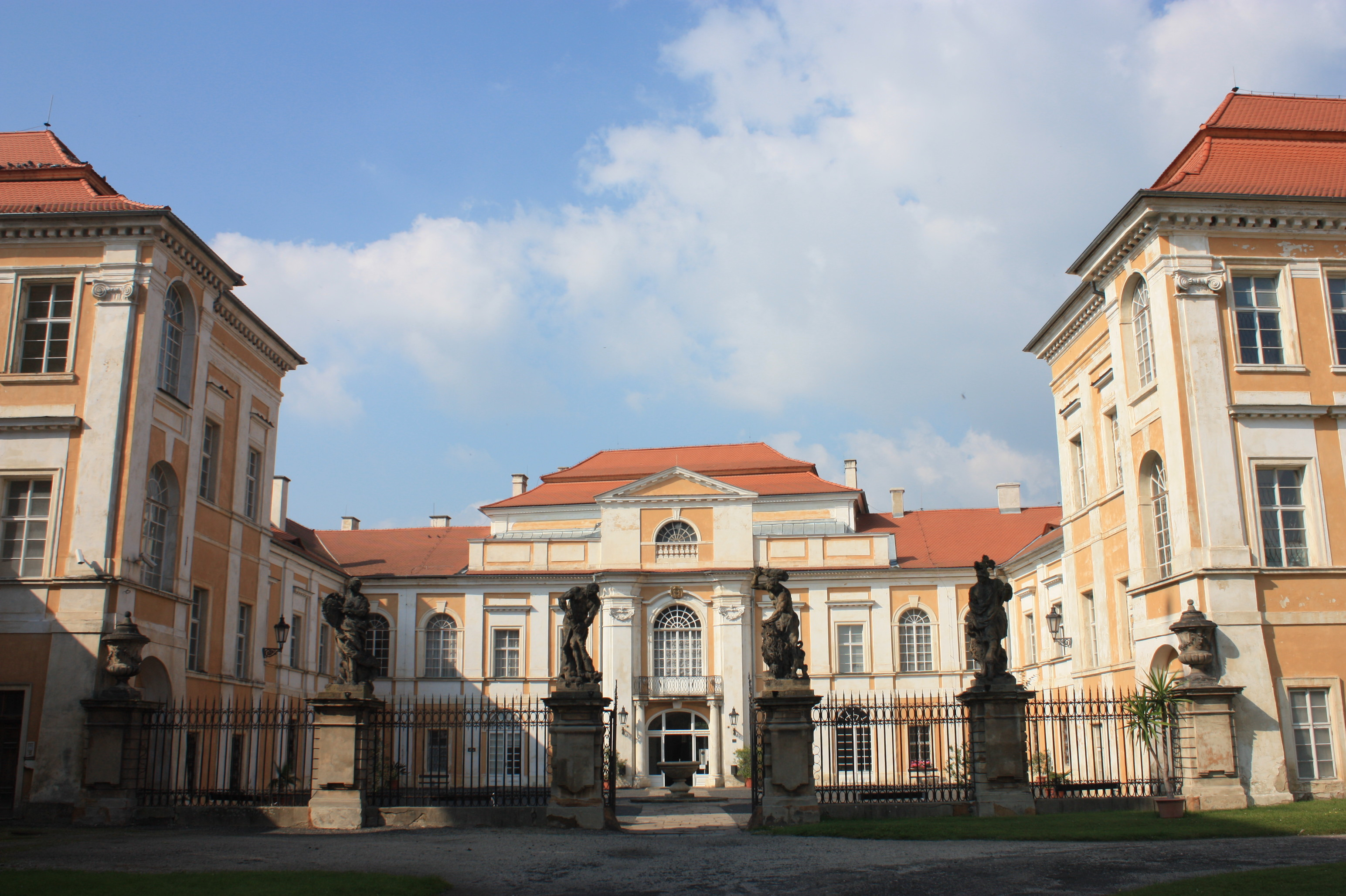
The entrance

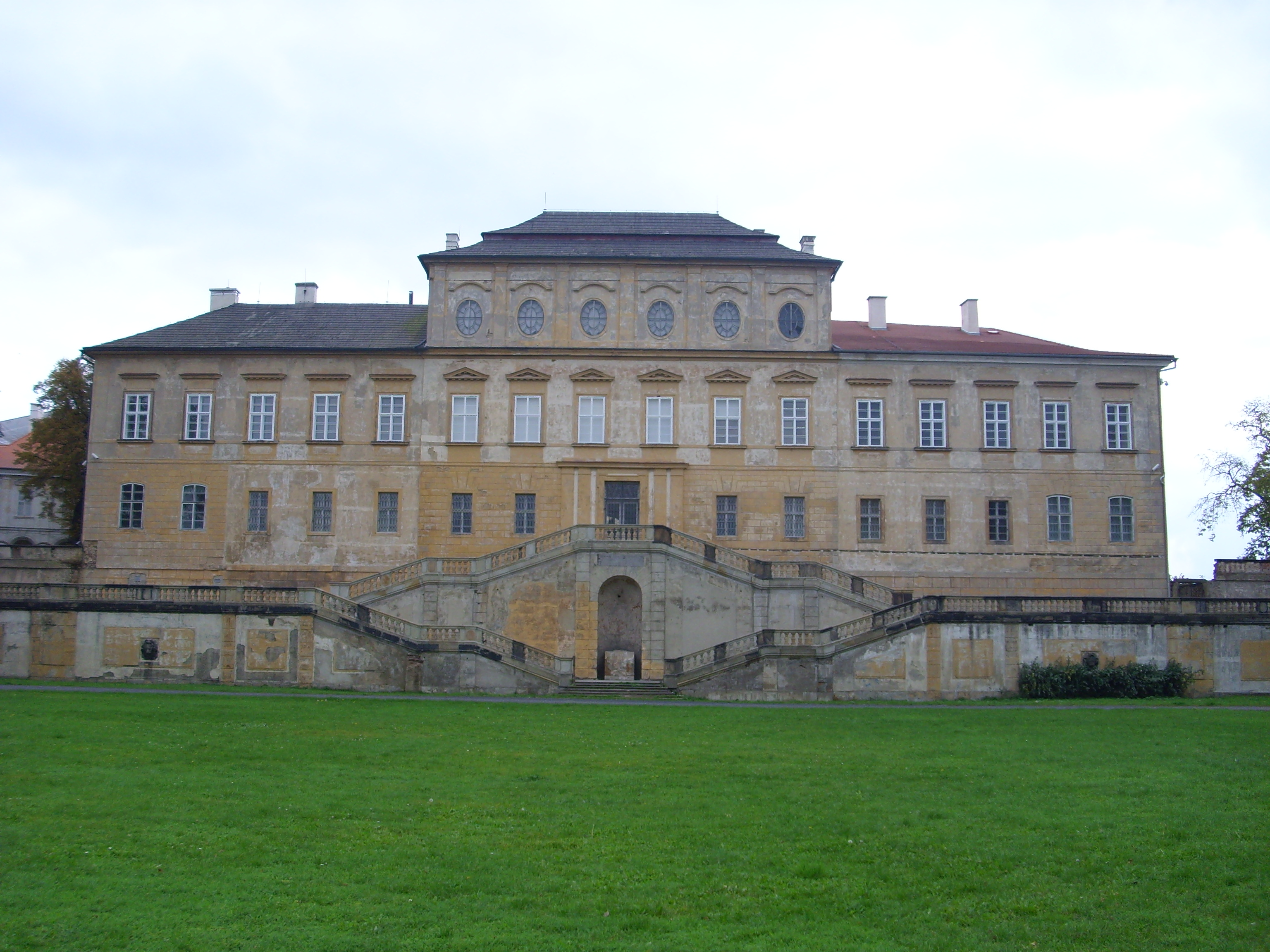
View from rear side

Duchcov Chateau (Czech: Zámek Duchcov; German: Schloss Dux) is a manor house in Duchcov in the Ústí nad Labem Region of the Czech Republic. It is protected as a national cultural monument.

Today the chateau houses a museum with a collection of historic furniture. Also on display is the painting and portrait gallery of the Waldstein family, including portraits of the most famous member of this family, Albrecht von Wallenstein, Duke of Friedland, by Anthony van Dyck. One room is dedicated to Giacomo Casanova, who was employed here as a librarian from 1785 until his death in 1798, and wrote his memoirs, Histoire de ma vie, here.

== History ==
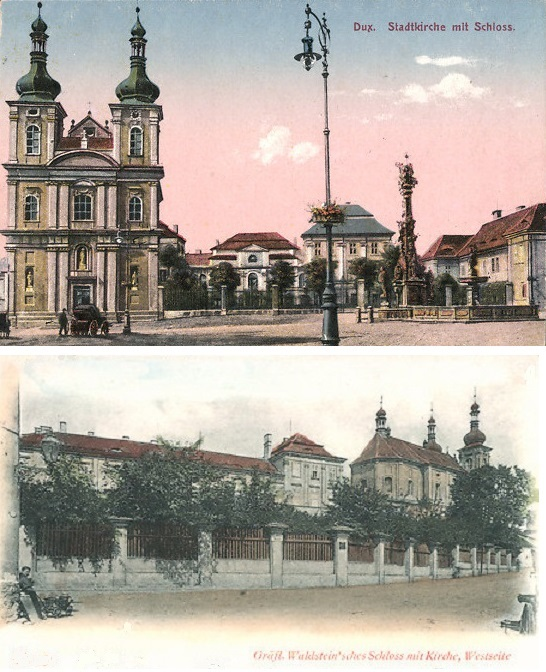
Two aspects of the chateau, c. 1900

The chateau was initially built as a fort in the 13th century by the Hrabišic family, which resided at the Osek Castle. Not earlier than 1527, the Lobkowicz family replaced the fort with a one-wing Renaissance palace. Marie Polyxena of Thalmberg, the widow of František Josef of Lobkowicz, married secondly Maximillian of Waldstein in 1642. Their son Jan Bedřich of Waldstein, later the Archbishop of Prague, was apprised with the French architect and painter Jean Baptiste Mathey, and he brought him to Duchcov for the purpose of rebuilding the residence. The castle was incorporated in the Waldstein's family fideicommis and passed on through inheritance to Ernst Joseph Count Waldstein and to his descendants until it was nationalised in 1945.

Mathey designed a huge Baroque complex, including a large park and a hospital. The decoration of the building was provided by the best Baroque artists in Bohemia, like the sculptors Matthias Braun, Ferdinand Brokoff, and painter Wenzel Lorenz Reiner. Between 1785 and 1798, Giacomo Casanova, the so-called secretary of the 18th century, spent the last thirteen years of his life in Duchcov.

In the 19th century, the castle was rebuilt in the Neoclassical style and the garden in the romantic style. The Waldstein family left the place in 1921.

At present, the chateau is state-owned and open to visitors. The garden grounds serve as a public park. Since 2002, the castle has been protected as a national cultural monument.

== See also ==
- List of castles in the Ústí nad Labem Region
