= Pravda Castle =

Ruined castle in the Czech Republic

Coordinates: 50°14′28″N 13°42′41″E

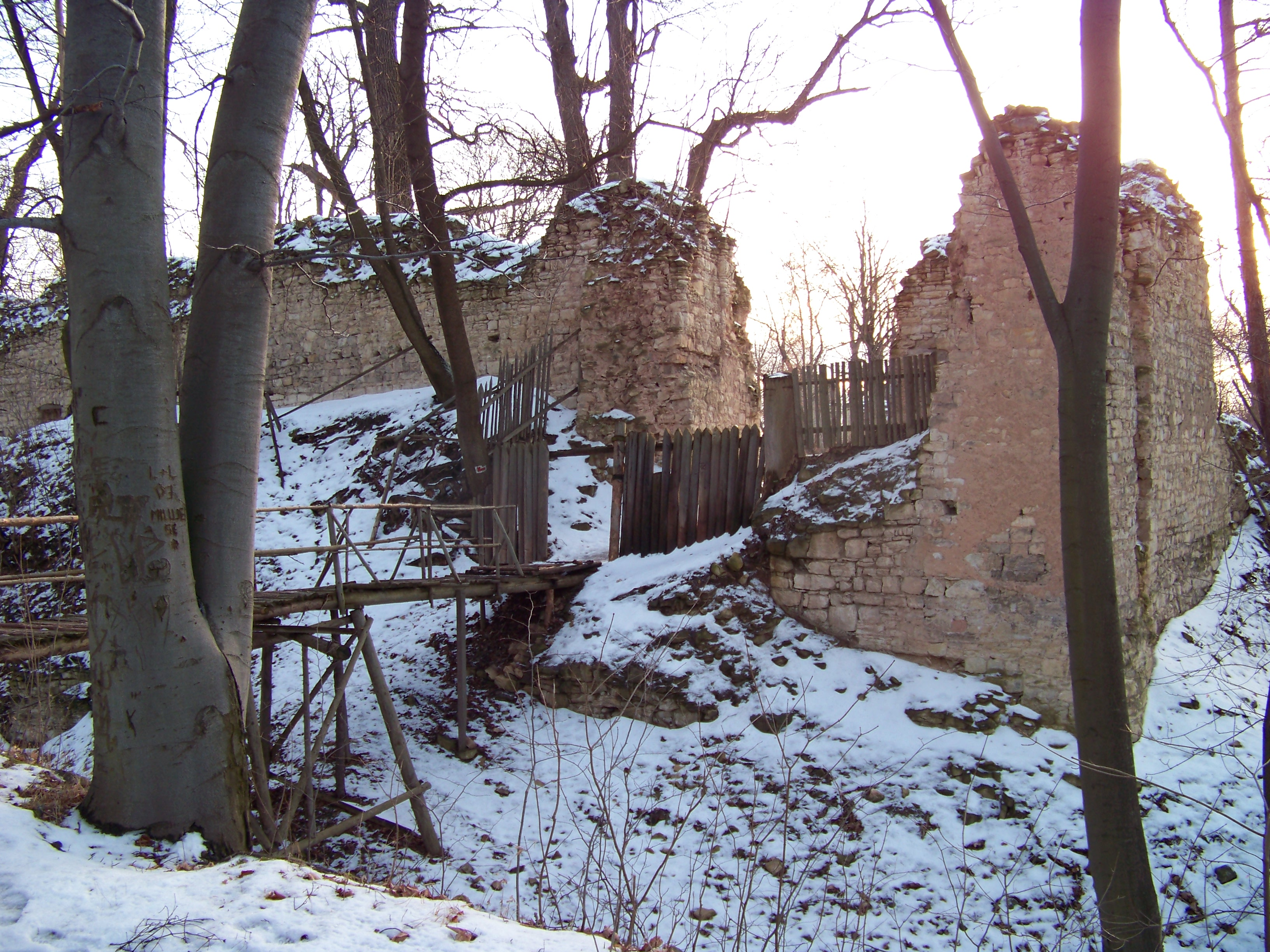
Entrance with footbridge over the moat

Inside

Pravda Castle is a castle ruin on a hill in Pnětluky in the Ústí nad Labem Region of the Czech Republic.

== Etymology ==
The name literally means "truth".

== History ==
The current castle was built around 1500 by Jan Mašťovský, though it may have been built on a much older foundation. The first written mention of Pravda is from 1518. At the time of construction it was a very modern and strong fortress. During the 16th century the importance of the castle diminished, resulting in its abandonment.

In modern times it has become a target for tourists and a place of meetings and festivals, during the 20th century, the castle's structure deteriorated significantly and attempts are being made to stabilize it.

== See also ==
- List of castles in the Ústí nad Labem Region
