= Krásný Buk Castle =

Krásný Buk
- Schönbuche
- Krásný Buk
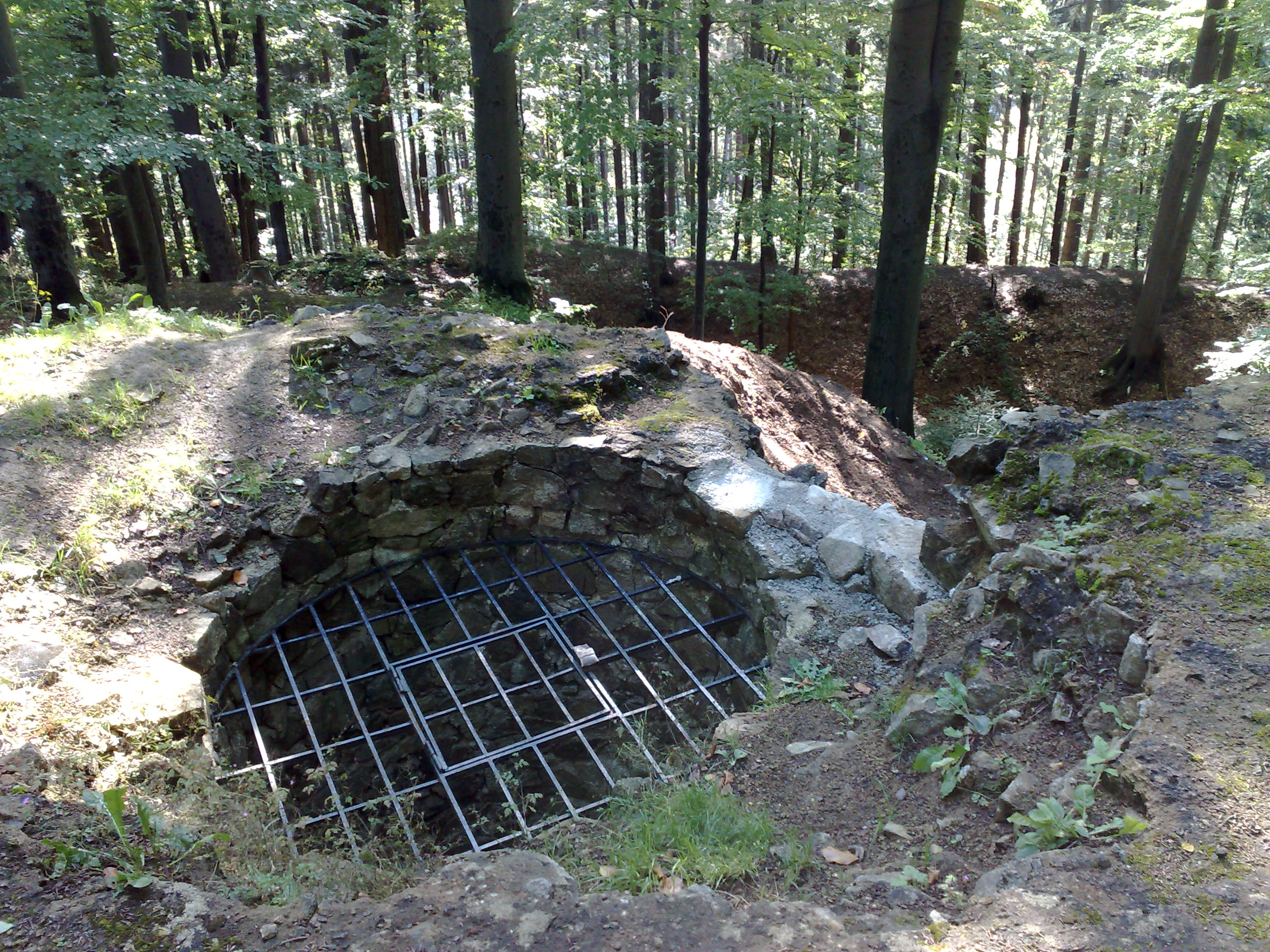
- Krasny Buk cave

Site information
- Code: CZ
- Condition: burgstall (no above-ground ruins)

Location
- Coordinates: 50°55′15″N 14°29′00″E

Site history
- Built: 13th century

Krásný Buk Castle (German: Schönbuche) is a ruined a medieval castle near the village of the same name (German: Schönbüchel) in the borough of Krásná Lípa (Schönlinde) in the Šluknov Hook in the Czech Republic. Of the original castle only a few section of wall and parts of the circular rampart (Ringwall) and castle moat have survived.

== History ==
Krásný Buk was probably founded in the second half of the 13th century. From 1263 its owners could have been the Markwartitz family, but there is no definite evidence of that. At the start of the 14th century the castle belonged to Henry of Leipa, who sold it on in 1319 to the Bohemian king, John of Luxembourg.

A little later the Wartenbergs were owners of the castle. They used it especially as a base for their raids. As a result, Krásný Buk was seized and destroyed on 15 September 1339 by troops of the Lusatian League. The castle was not rebuilt again and fell into ruins.

Excavations in 1850 at the castle brought shards of pottery and reportedly also horseshoes, arrowheads and a Hussite mace to light. In addition, not far from the castle on a field a badly weathered Roman coin, broken in two, was found dating to the rule of the Emperor Hadrian (117–138 A.D.).

== See also ==
- List of castles in the Czech Republic
