= Vrbičany (Kladno District) =

- Municipality
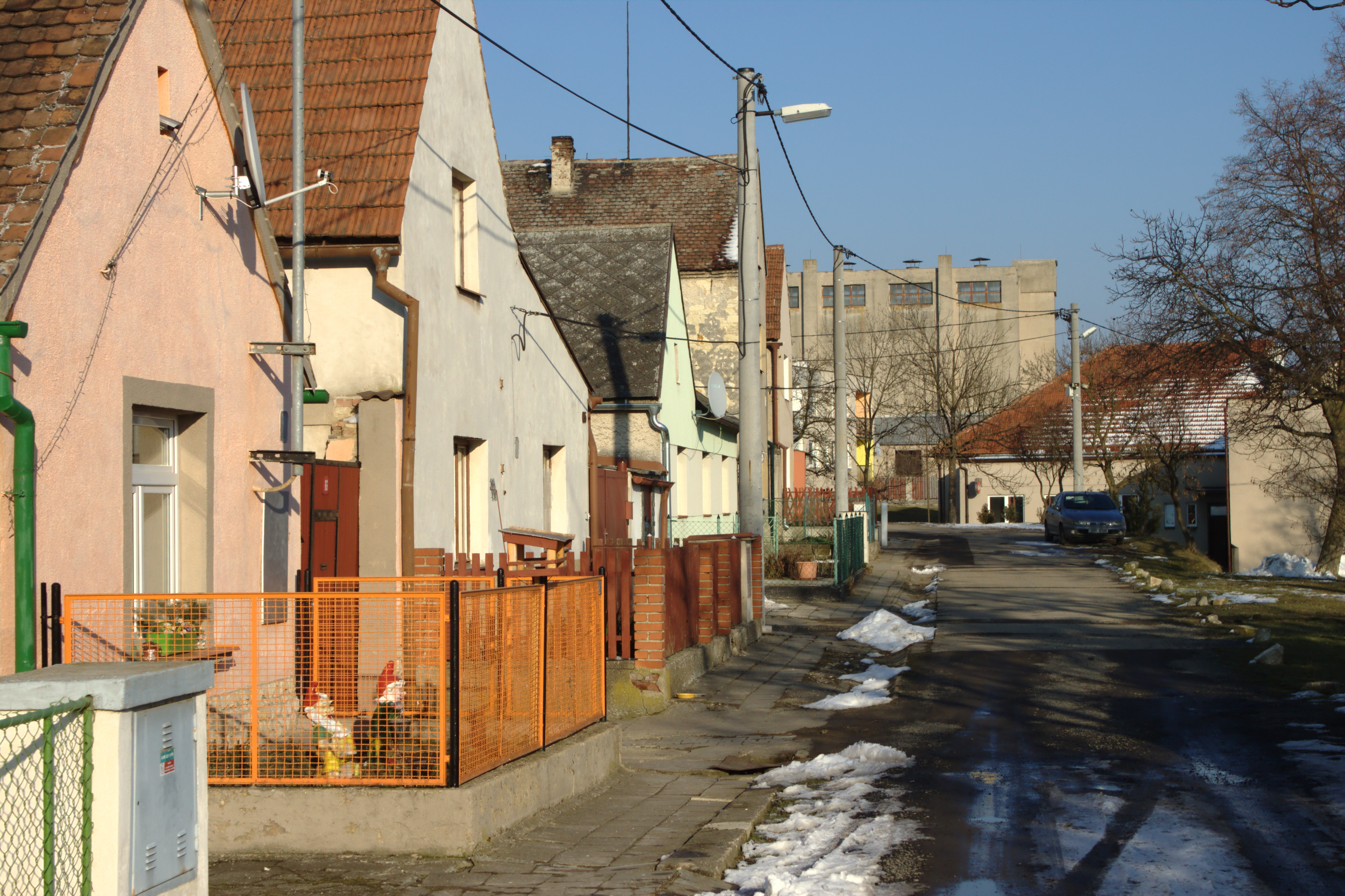
- A street in Vrbičany

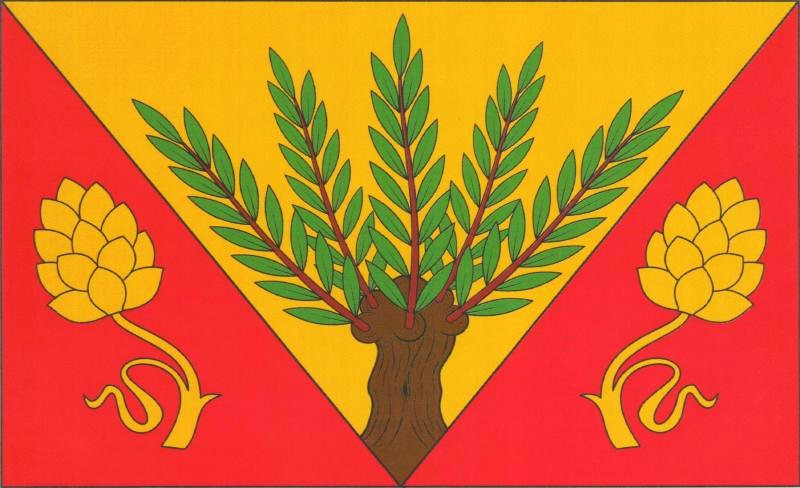
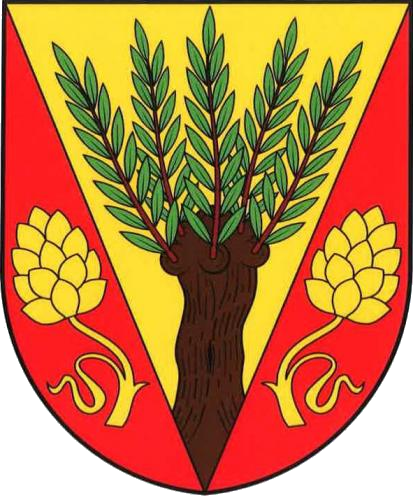
- Flag Coat of arms

- Location in the Czech Republic
- Coordinates: 50°18′29″N 13°59′45″E
- Country: Czech Republic
- Region: Central Bohemian
- District: Kladno
- First mentioned: 1318

Area
  - Total: 3.50 km^{2} (1.35 sq mi)
- Elevation: 310 m (1,020 ft)

Population (2026-01-01)
  - Total: 213
  - Density: 60.9/km^{2} (158/sq mi)
- Time zone: UTC+1 (CET)
  - Summer (DST): UTC+2 (CEST)
- Postal code: 273 74
- Website: www.obecvrbicany.cz

Vrbičany (German: Worwitschan) is a municipality and village in Kladno District in the Central Bohemian Region of the Czech Republic. It has about 200 inhabitants.

== Demographics ==
Historical population
Year	Pop.	±%
1869	306	—
1880	368	+20.3%
1890	398	+8.2%
1900	442	+11.1%
1910	442	+0.0%
1921	403	−8.8%
1930	448	+11.2%
1950	393	−12.3%
1961	330	−16.0%
1970	295	−10.6%
1980	232	−21.4%
1991	161	−30.6%
2001	174	+8.1%
2011	213	+22.4%
2021	202	−5.2%
Source: Censuses
