= Velké Žernoseky =

- Municipality
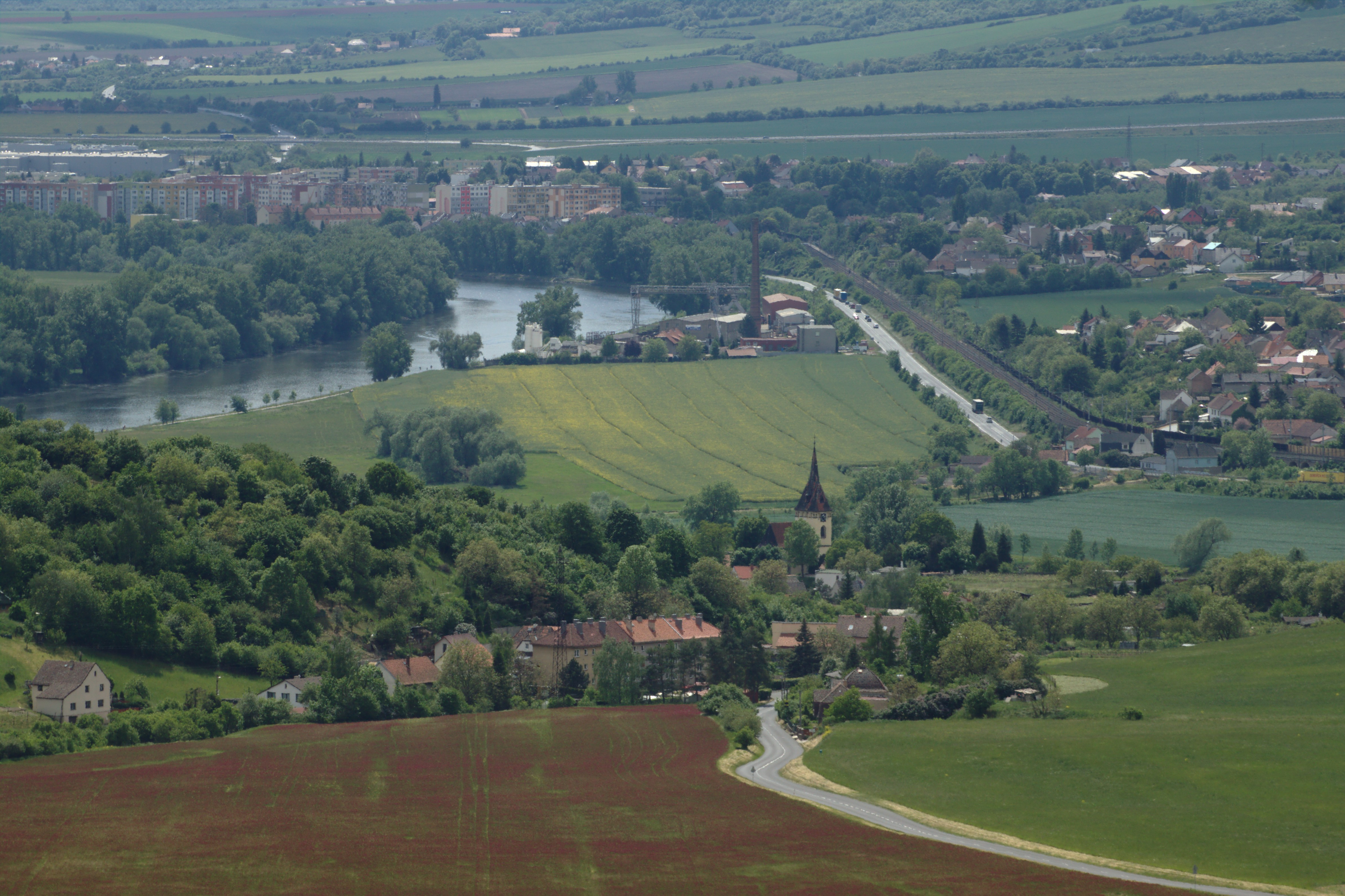
- View from the northeast

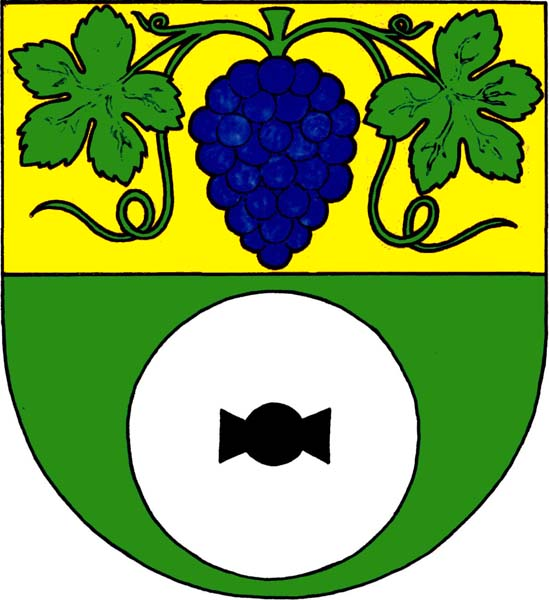
- Flag Coat of arms

- Location in the Czech Republic
- Coordinates: 50°33′19″N 14°9′24″E
- Country: Czech Republic
- Region: Ústí nad Labem
- District: Litoměřice
- First mentioned: 1218

Area
  - Total: 2.96 km^{2} (1.14 sq mi)
- Elevation: 151 m (495 ft)

Population (2026-01-01)
  - Total: 507
  - Density: 171/km^{2} (444/sq mi)
- Time zone: UTC+1 (CET)
  - Summer (DST): UTC+2 (CEST)
- Postal code: 412 01
- Website: www.velke-zernoseky.cz

Velké Žernoseky (Czech pronunciation: [ˈvɛlkɛː ˈʒɛrnosɛkɪ]) is a municipality and village in Litoměřice District in the Ústí nad Labem Region of the Czech Republic. It has about 500 inhabitants. The municipality is located on the Elbe River in the Central Bohemian Uplands and is known for viticulture.

== Etymology ==
The name Žernoseky is derived from the older Czech word žernosek ('millstone maker').The prefix velké ('great') distinguishes the village from the nearby village of Malé Žernoseky ('small Žernoseky').

== Geography ==
Velké Žernoseky is located about 4 kilometres (2 mi) west of Litoměřice and 14 km (9 mi) south of Ústí nad Labem. It lies in the Central Bohemian Uplands. The highest point is the hill Strážiště at 362 metres (1,188 ft) above sea level. The municipality is situated on the right bank of the Elbe River.

== History ==
The first written mention of Velké Žernoseky is in the foundation deed of the Litoměřice Chapter from 1218.

== Demographics ==
Historical population

| Year | Pop. | ±% |
|---|---|---|
| 1869 | 457 | — |
| 1880 | 439 | −3.9% |
| 1890 | 421 | −4.1% |
| 1900 | 481 | +14.3% |
| 1910 | 633 | +31.6% |

| Year | Pop. | ±% |
|---|---|---|
| 1921 | 601 | −5.1% |
| 1930 | 705 | +17.3% |
| 1950 | 581 | −17.6% |
| 1961 | 642 | +10.5% |
| 1970 | 581 | −9.5% |

| Year | Pop. | ±% |
|---|---|---|
| 1980 | 546 | −6.0% |
| 1991 | 442 | −19.0% |
| 2001 | 472 | +6.8% |
| 2011 | 473 | +0.2% |
| 2021 | 480 | +1.5% |

Source: Censuses

== Economy ==
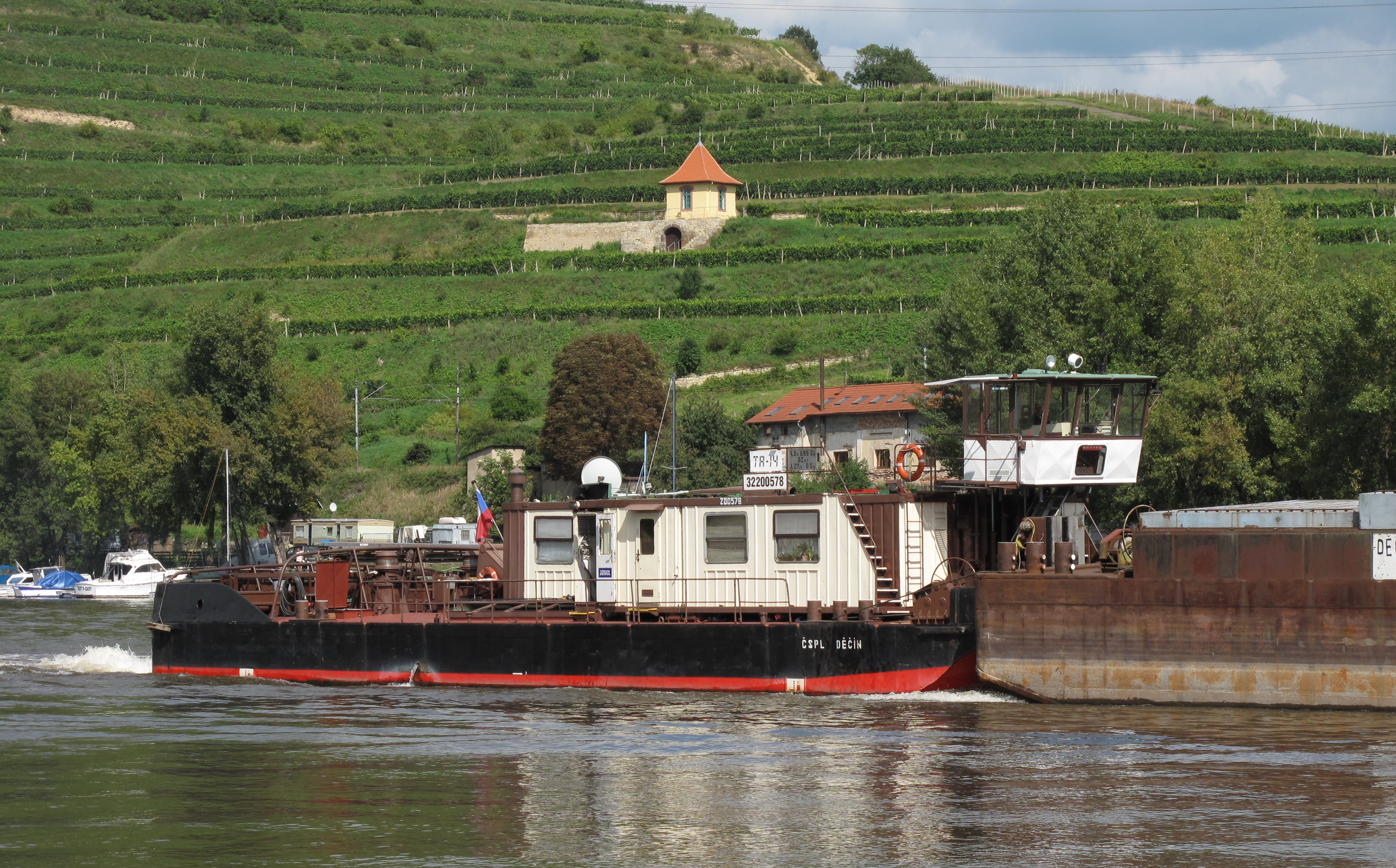
Vineyards

Since the 12th century, Velké Žernoseky has been known for viticulture. It belongs to the Litoměřická wine sub-region and is one of the northernmost wine-growing places in Europe.

== Transport ==
Velké Žernoseky is located on the railway line Ústí nad Labem–Lysá nad Labem.

== Sights ==
The main landmark of Velké Žernoseky is the Church of Saint Nicholas. It was built in the Gothic style in the 14th century and rebuilt in the 16th century.

The Velké Žernoseky Castle is located in the centre of the village. It was built in the early Baroque style in the 17th century by Giulio Broggi, on the site of a Gothic fortress. Under the castle, Gothic wine cellars have been preserved, founded no later than the 13th century. Today the castle is used as a winery and for accommodation.
