= Blšany u Loun =

- Municipality
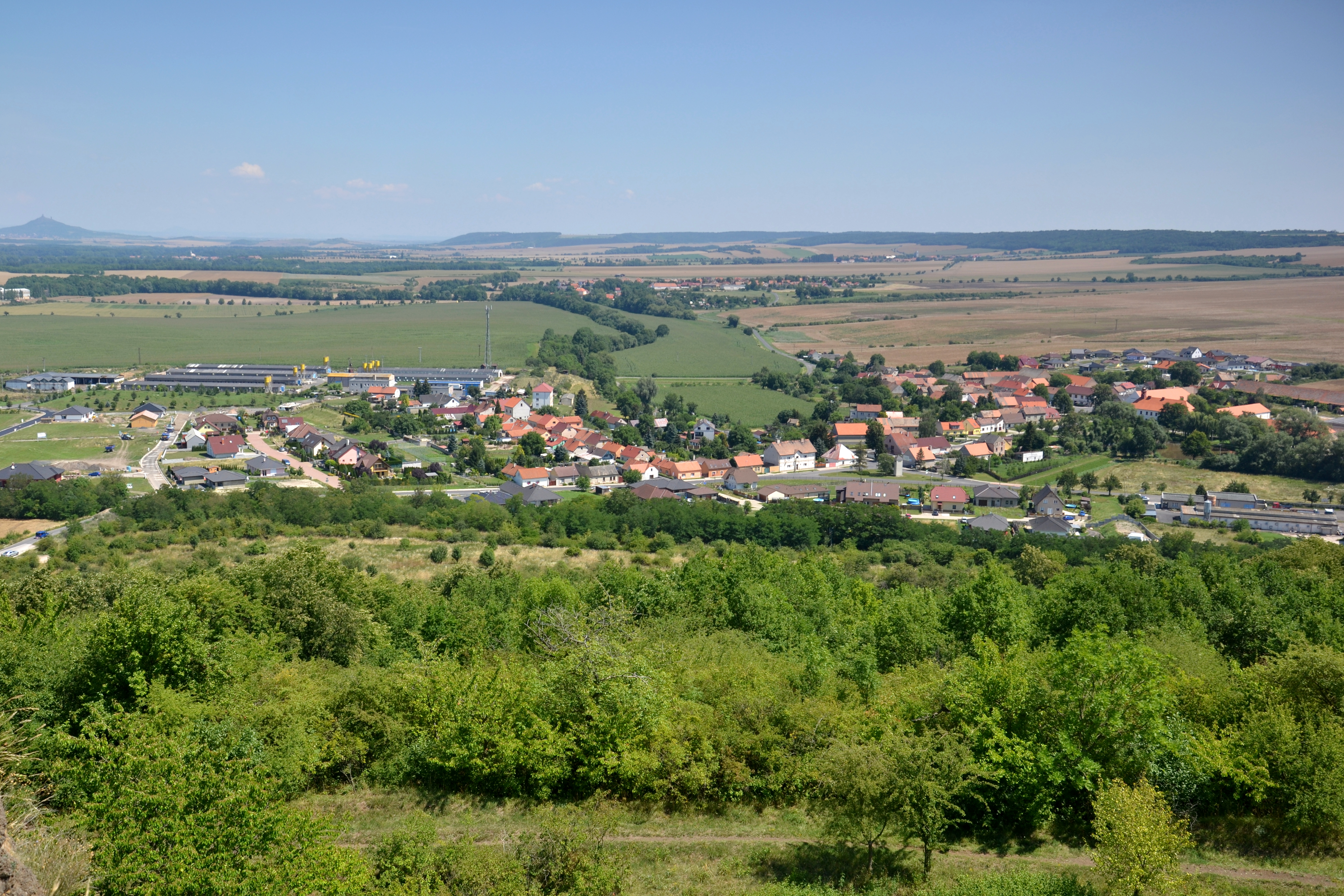
- View from the west

- Flag Coat of arms

- Location in the Czech Republic
- Coordinates: 50°20′49″N 13°51′10″E
- Country: Czech Republic
- Region: Ústí nad Labem
- District: Louny
- First mentioned: 1227

Area
  - Total: 4.29 km^{2} (1.66 sq mi)
- Elevation: 199 m (653 ft)

Population (2026-01-01)
  - Total: 408
  - Density: 95.1/km^{2} (246/sq mi)
- Time zone: UTC+1 (CET)
  - Summer (DST): UTC+2 (CEST)
- Postal code: 440 01
- Website: blsanyuloun.cz

Blšany u Loun (German: Pschan) is a municipality and village in Louny District in the Ústí nad Labem Region of the Czech Republic. It has about 400 inhabitants.

Blšany u Loun lies approximately 5 kilometres (3 mi) east of Louny, 38 km (24 mi) south of Ústí nad Labem, and 50 km (31 mi) north-west of Prague.

== Demographics ==
Historical population
Year	Pop.	±%
1869	328	—
1880	401	+22.3%
1890	424	+5.7%
1900	497	+17.2%
1910	549	+10.5%
1921	473	−13.8%
1930	441	−6.8%
1950	307	−30.4%
1961	304	−1.0%
1970	302	−0.7%
1980	270	−10.6%
1991	207	−23.3%
2001	203	−1.9%
2011	239	+17.7%
2021	392	+64.0%
Source: Censuses
