= Chřibský hrádek =

- Karlštejn, Unterer Karlstein, Wüstes Schloss
- Chřibská
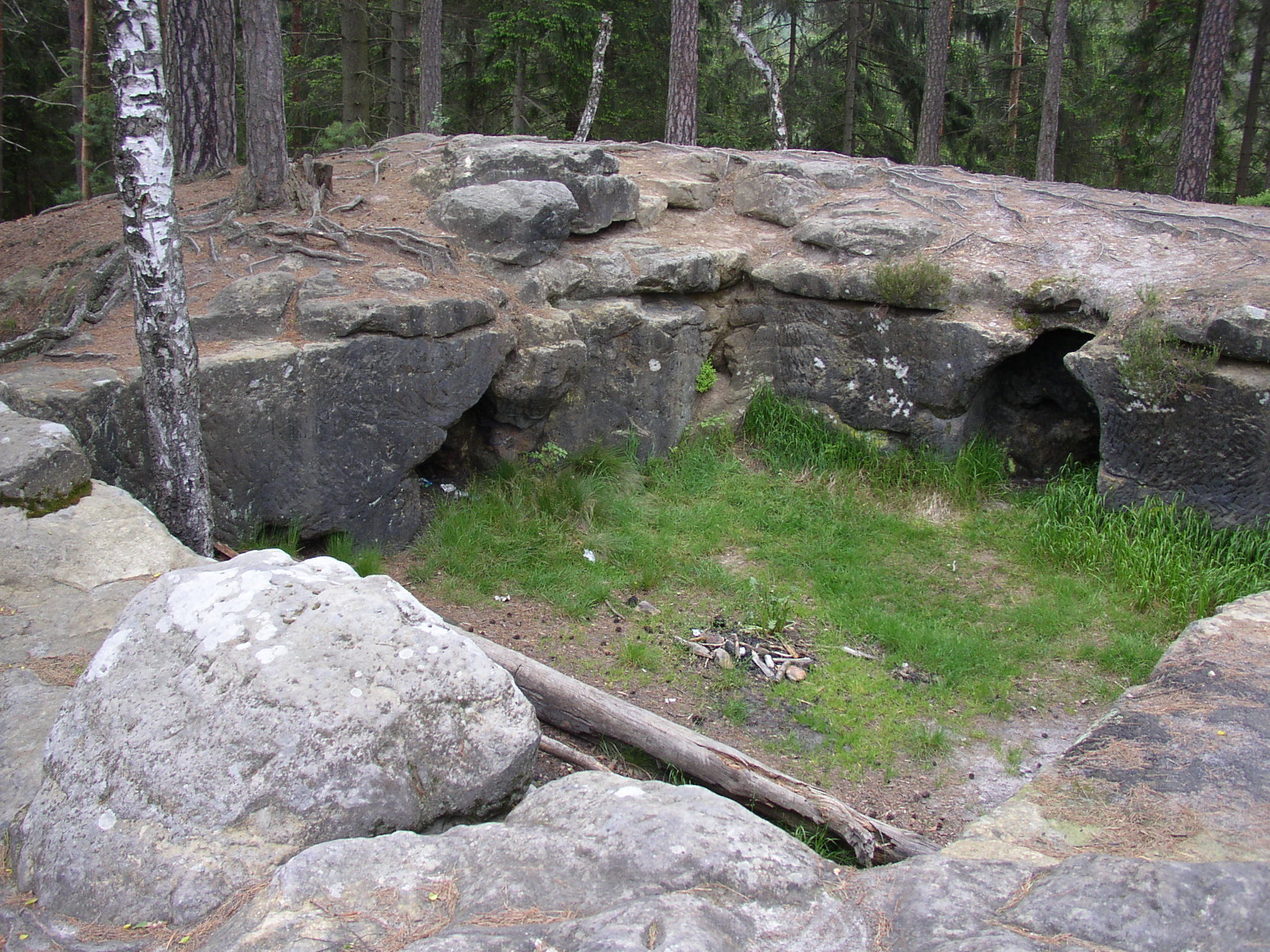
- Room carved out of the rock

Site information
- Condition: burgstall (no above-ground ruins)

Location
- Coordinates: 50°52′23.47″N 14°27′6.55″E

Chřibský hrádek (older name Karlštejn; German: Unterer Karlstein or Wüstes Schloss) is a ruined rock castle in Doubice in the Ústí nad Labem Region of the Czech Republic. It is located in the Elbe Sandstone Mountains.

== Location ==
Chřibský hrádek Castle lies in the southernmost tip of the municipal territory of Doubice near its border with the town of Chřibská. It is located in the Elbe Sandstone Mountains, in the Lusatian Mountains Protected Landscape Area near its border with the Bohemian Switzerland National Park. The castle is situated on a rock outcrop in the valley of the Doubický Stream not far from the isolated gamekeeper's house of Hájovna Saula (also U Sloupu) that, today, houses an information office for the Bohemian Switzerland National Park.

== History ==
The castle was founded by the Michalovice family in the second half of the 13th century to protect a trade route to Lusatia. It was burned down during the Hussite Wars (1419–1434).

== See also ==
- List of castles in the Czech Republic

== Literature ==
- Anděl, Rudolf (et al.): Hrady, zámky a tvrze v Čechách, na Moravě a ve Slezsku. Bd. III : Severní Čechy. Svoboda, Prague, 1984
- Klos, Richard: Die sechs Felsenburgen in der Böhmischen Schweiz. In: Sächsische Heimatblätter Heft 3/1968, pp. 97–103
