= Divec =

- Municipality
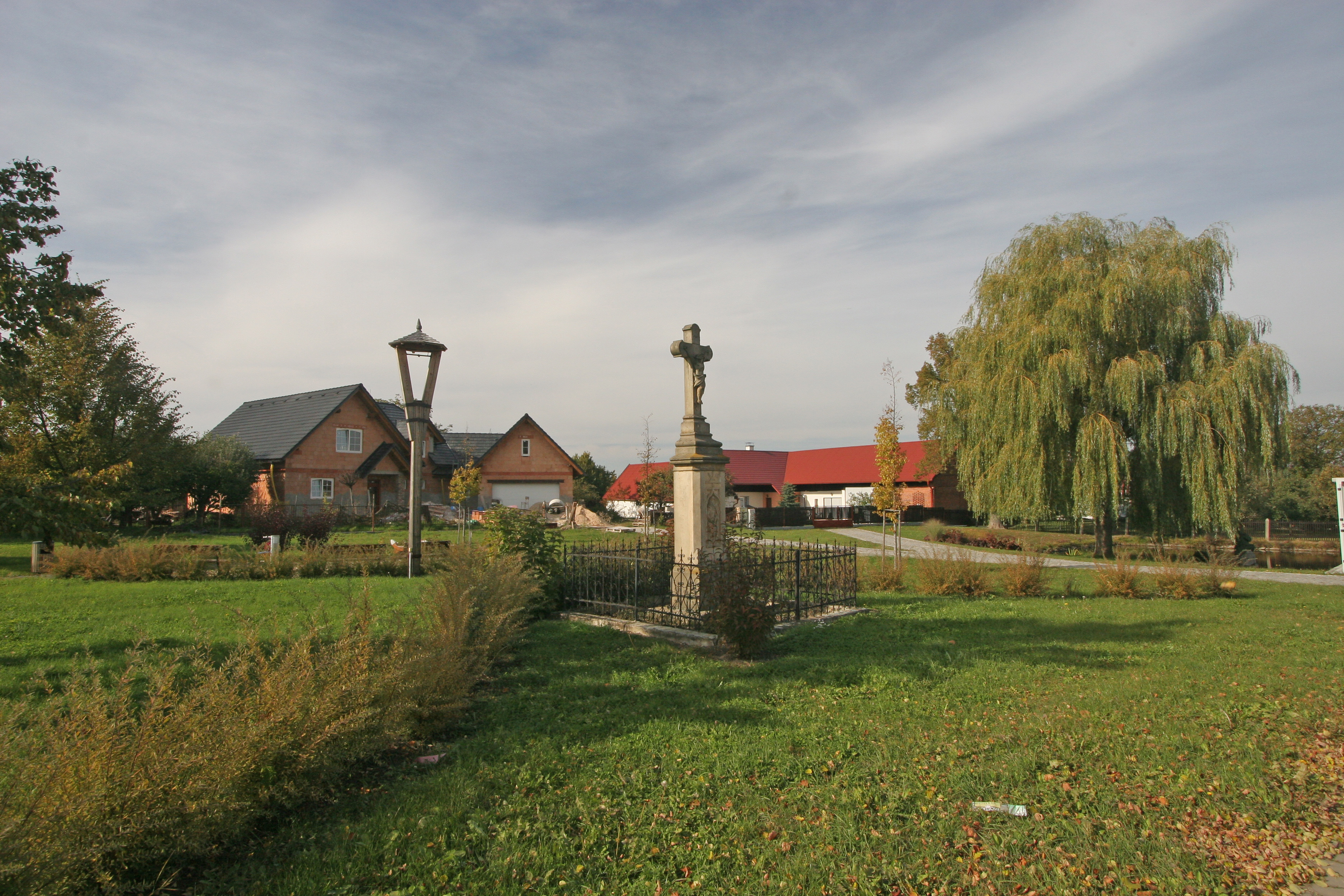
- Belfry and a cross

- Flag Coat of arms

- Location in the Czech Republic
- Coordinates: 50°14′23″N 15°55′18″E
- Country: Czech Republic
- Region: Hradec Králové
- District: Hradec Králové
- First mentioned: 1306

Area
  - Total: 3.51 km^{2} (1.36 sq mi)
- Elevation: 253 m (830 ft)

Population (2026-01-01)
  - Total: 272
  - Density: 77.5/km^{2} (201/sq mi)
- Time zone: UTC+1 (CET)
  - Summer (DST): UTC+2 (CEST)
- Postal code: 500 03
- Website: www.divec.cz

Divec is a municipality and village in Hradec Králové District in the Hradec Králové Region of the Czech Republic. It has about 300 inhabitants.

== Demographics ==
Historical population
Year	Pop.	±%
1869	257	—
1880	236	−8.2%
1890	240	+1.7%
1900	245	+2.1%
1910	262	+6.9%
1921	266	+1.5%
1930	254	−4.5%
1950	170	−33.1%
1961	155	−8.8%
1970	153	−1.3%
1980	128	−16.3%
1991	97	−24.2%
2001	120	+23.7%
2011	208	+73.3%
2021	248	+19.2%
Source: Censuses
