= Vesce (Tábor District) =

- Municipality
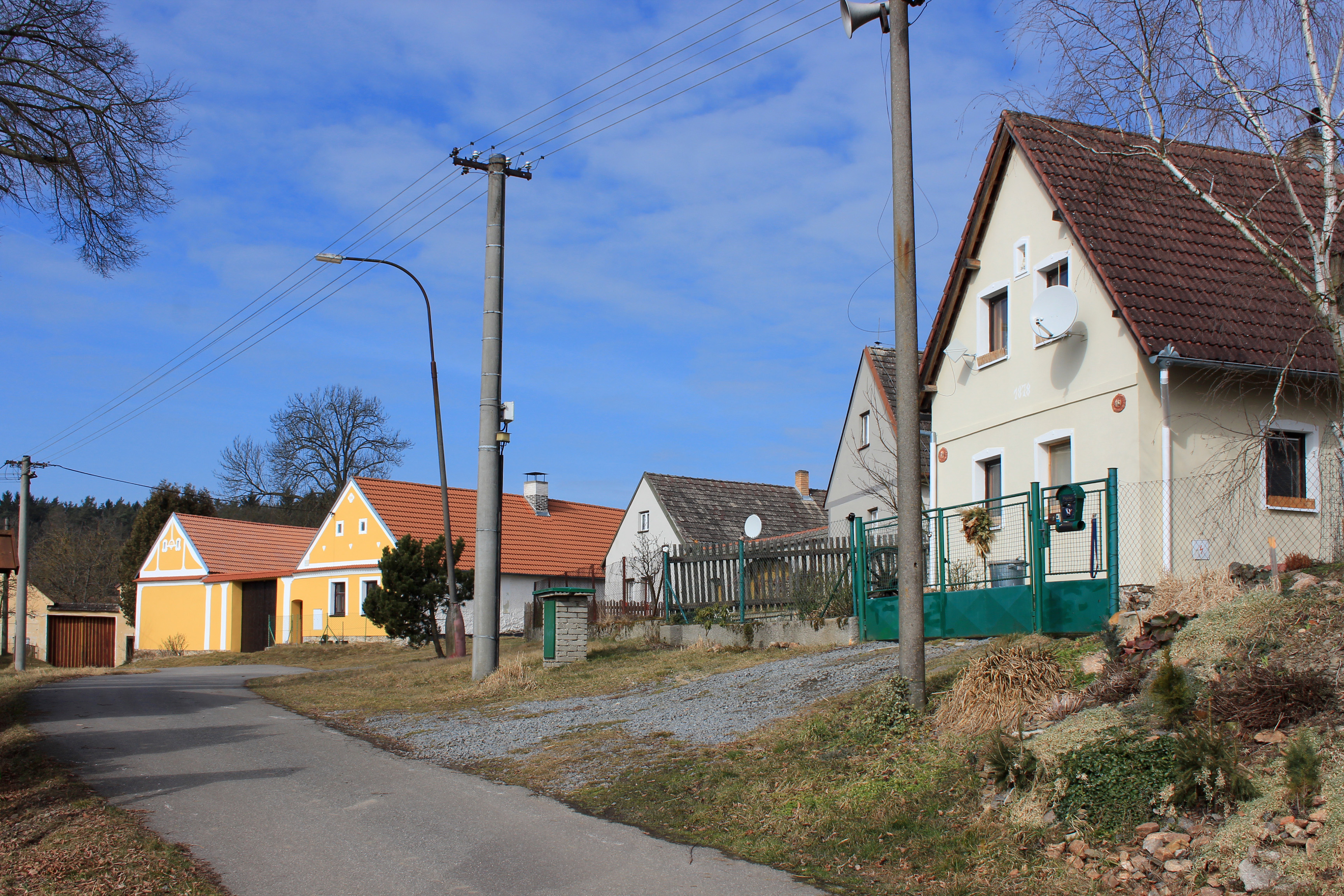
- Čeraz, a part of Vesce

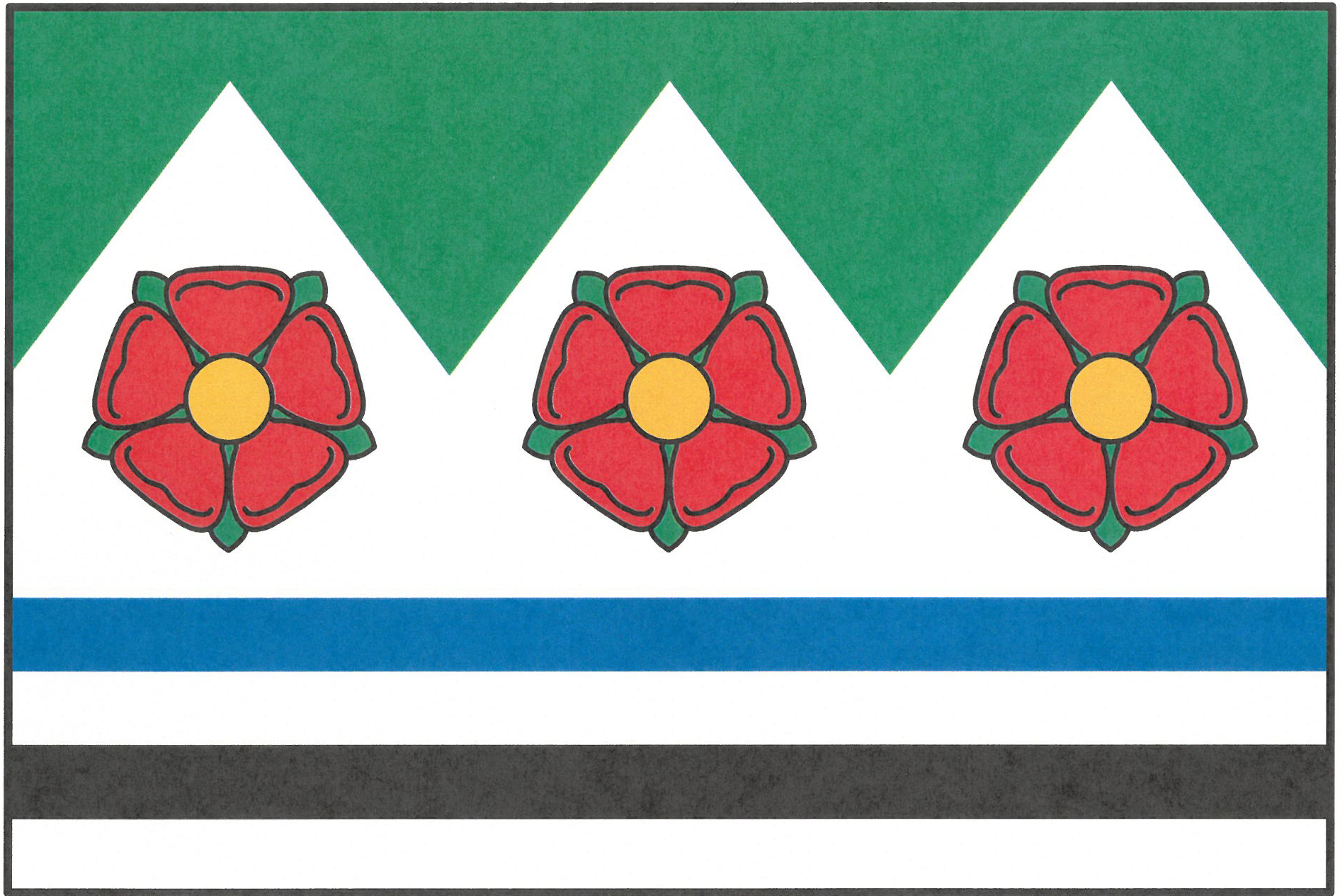
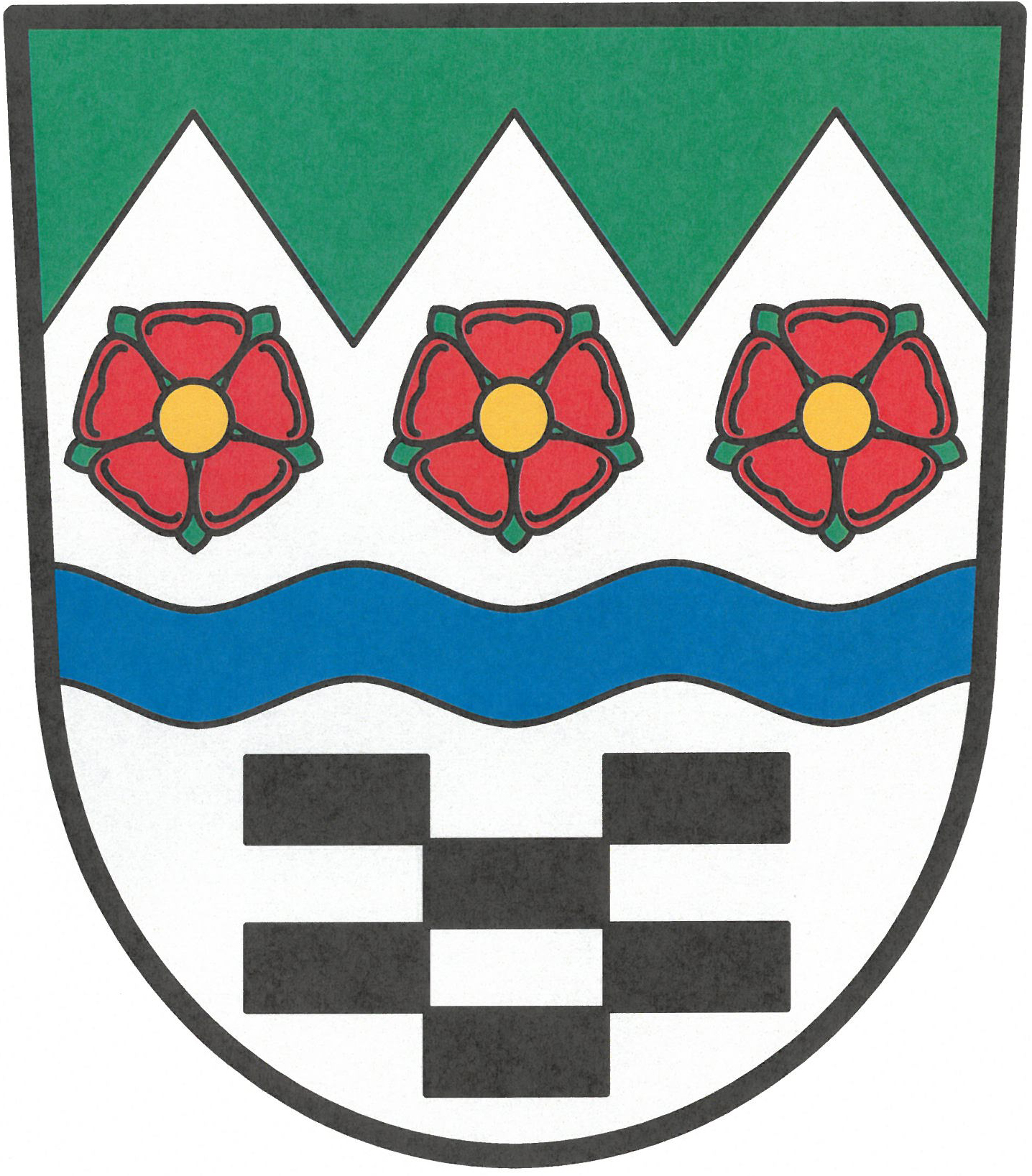
- Flag Coat of arms

- Location in the Czech Republic
- Coordinates: 49°14′59″N 14°40′37″E
- Country: Czech Republic
- Region: South Bohemian
- District: Tábor
- First mentioned: 1421

Area
  - Total: 7.44 km^{2} (2.87 sq mi)
- Elevation: 465 m (1,526 ft)

Population (2026-01-01)
  - Total: 302
  - Density: 40.6/km^{2} (105/sq mi)
- Time zone: UTC+1 (CET)
  - Summer (DST): UTC+2 (CEST)
- Postal code: 392 01
- Website: www.obecvesce.cz

Vesce is a municipality and village in Tábor District in the South Bohemian Region of the Czech Republic. It has about 300 inhabitants.

Vesce lies approximately 20 kilometres (12 mi) south of Tábor, 34 km (21 mi) north-east of České Budějovice, and 96 km (60 mi) south of Prague.

== Administrative division ==
Vesce consists of three municipal parts (in brackets population according to the 2021 census):

- Vesce (177)
- Čeraz (50)
- Mokrá (39)

== Demographics ==
Historical population
Year	Pop.	±%
1869	380	—
1880	402	+5.8%
1890	422	+5.0%
1900	372	−11.8%
1910	399	+7.3%
1921	418	+4.8%
1930	384	−8.1%
1950	303	−21.1%
1961	301	−0.7%
1970	274	−9.0%
1980	269	−1.8%
1991	237	−11.9%
2001	221	−6.8%
2011	269	+21.7%
2021	266	−1.1%
Source: Censuses
