= Kostomlaty pod Milešovkou =

- Municipality
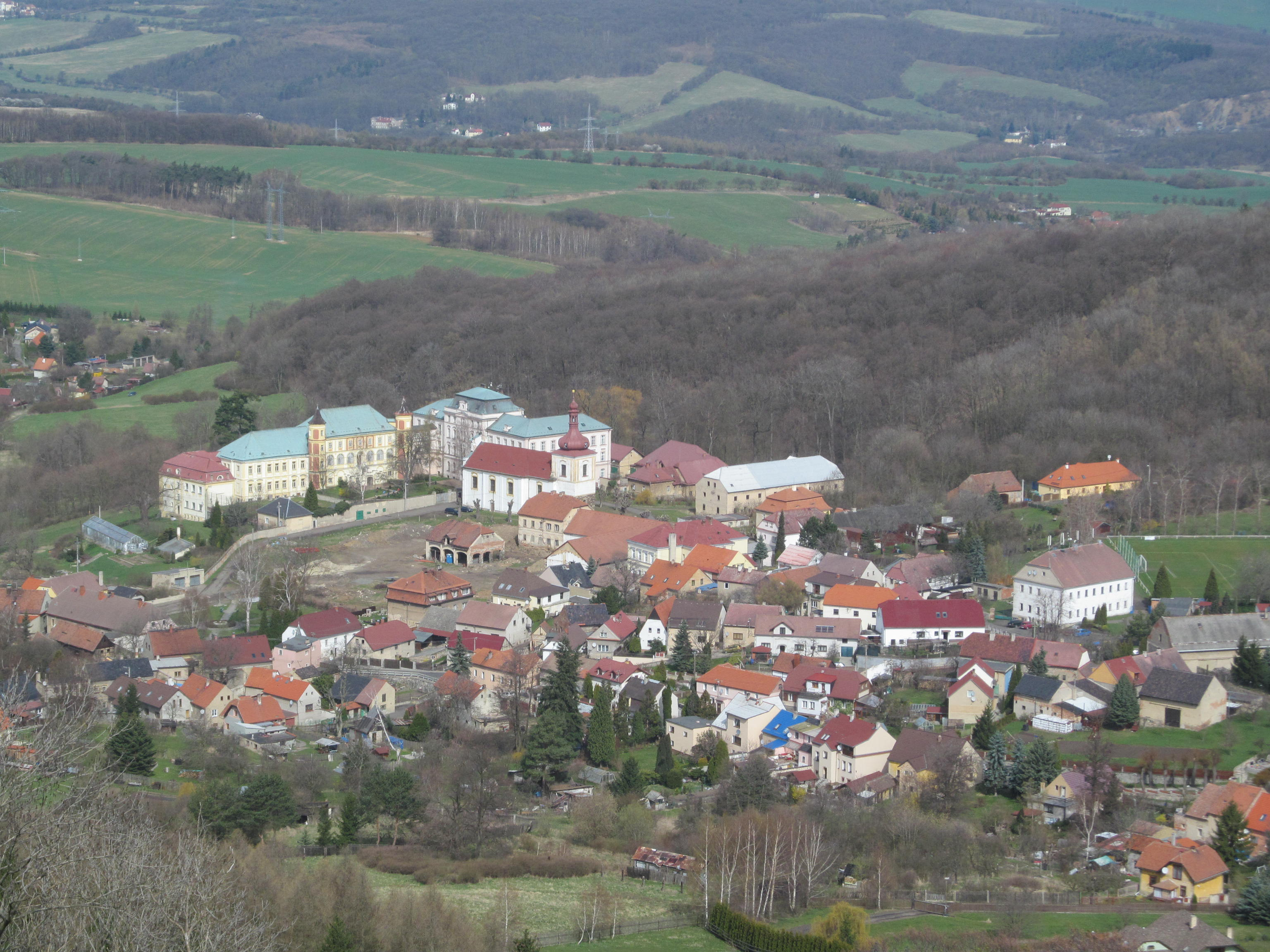
- View from the Kostomlaty castle

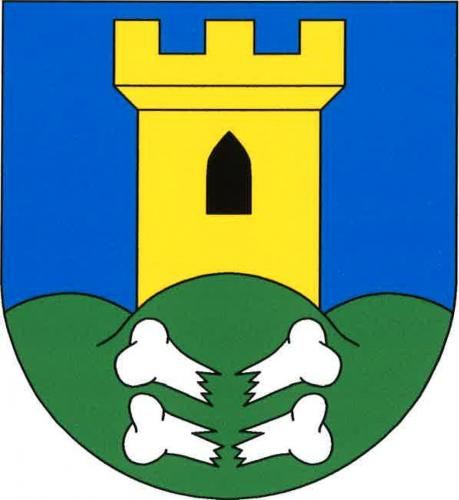
- Flag Coat of arms

- Location in the Czech Republic
- Coordinates: 50°33′37″N 13°52′23″E
- Country: Czech Republic
- Region: Ústí nad Labem
- District: Teplice
- First mentioned: 1333

Area
  - Total: 11.15 km^{2} (4.31 sq mi)
- Elevation: 405 m (1,329 ft)

Population (2026-01-01)
  - Total: 916
  - Density: 82.2/km^{2} (213/sq mi)
- Time zone: UTC+1 (CET)
  - Summer (DST): UTC+2 (CEST)
- Postal code: 417 54
- Website: kostomlatypm.cz

Kostomlaty pod Milešovkou (German: Kostenblat) is a municipality and village in Teplice District in the Ústí nad Labem Region of the Czech Republic. It has about 900 inhabitants.

Kostomlaty pod Milešovkou lies approximately 10 kilometres (6 mi) south-east of Teplice, 17 km (11 mi) south-west of Ústí nad Labem, and 66 km (41 mi) north-west of Prague.

== Administrative division ==
Kostomlaty pod Milešovkou consists of two municipal parts (in brackets population according to the 2021 census):

- Kostomlaty pod Milešovkou (913)
- Hlince (19)

== Demographics ==
Historical population
Year	Pop.	±%
1869	1,016	—
1880	1,083	+6.6%
1890	1,178	+8.8%
1900	1,323	+12.3%
1910	1,520	+14.9%
1921	1,635	+7.6%
1930	1,720	+5.2%
1950	1,017	−40.9%
1961	1,183	+16.3%
1970	1,034	−12.6%
1980	957	−7.4%
1991	788	−17.7%
2001	848	+7.6%
2011	876	+3.3%
2021	932	+6.4%
Source: Censuses
