= Perštejn =

- Municipality
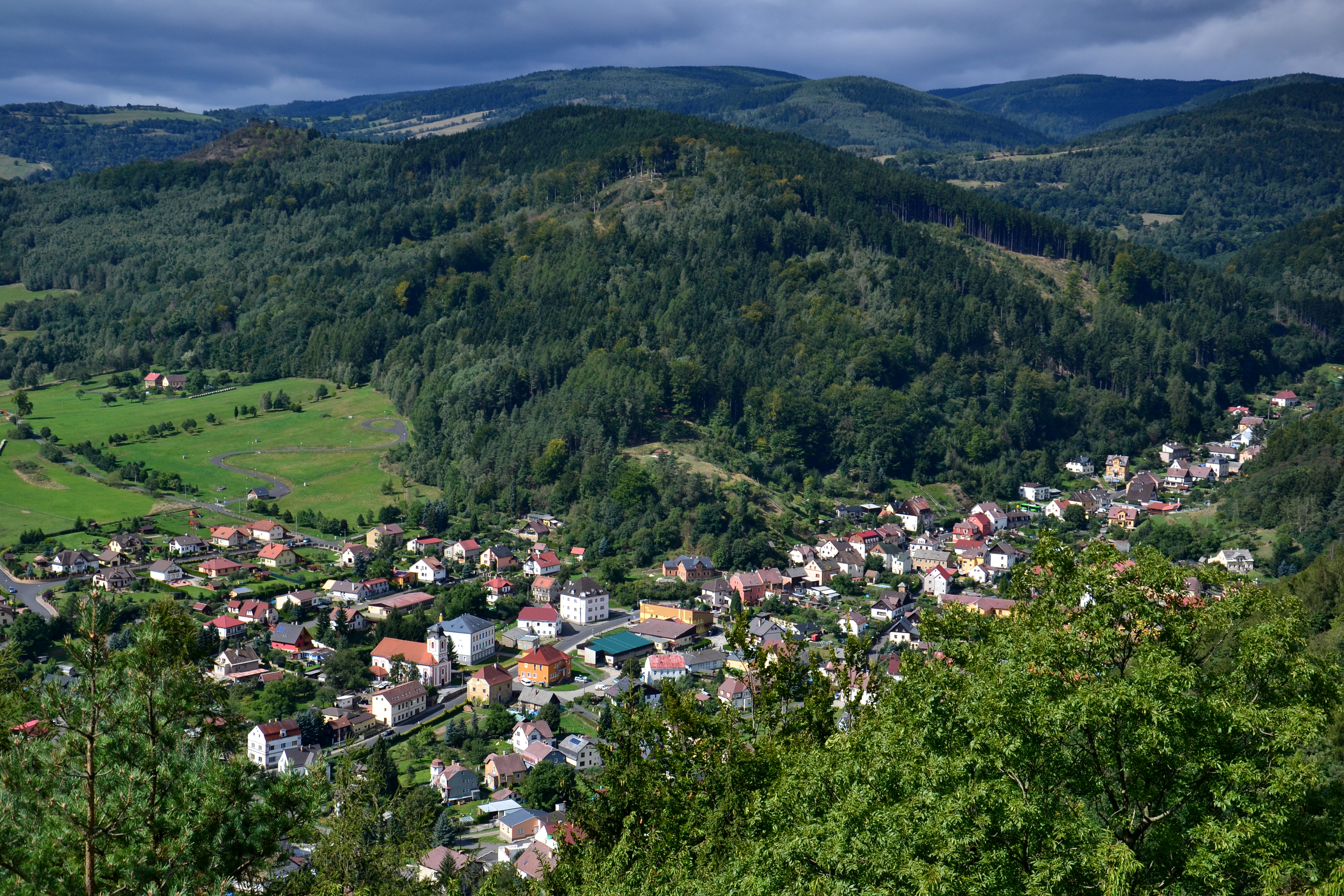
- Perštejn as seen from Hradiště hill

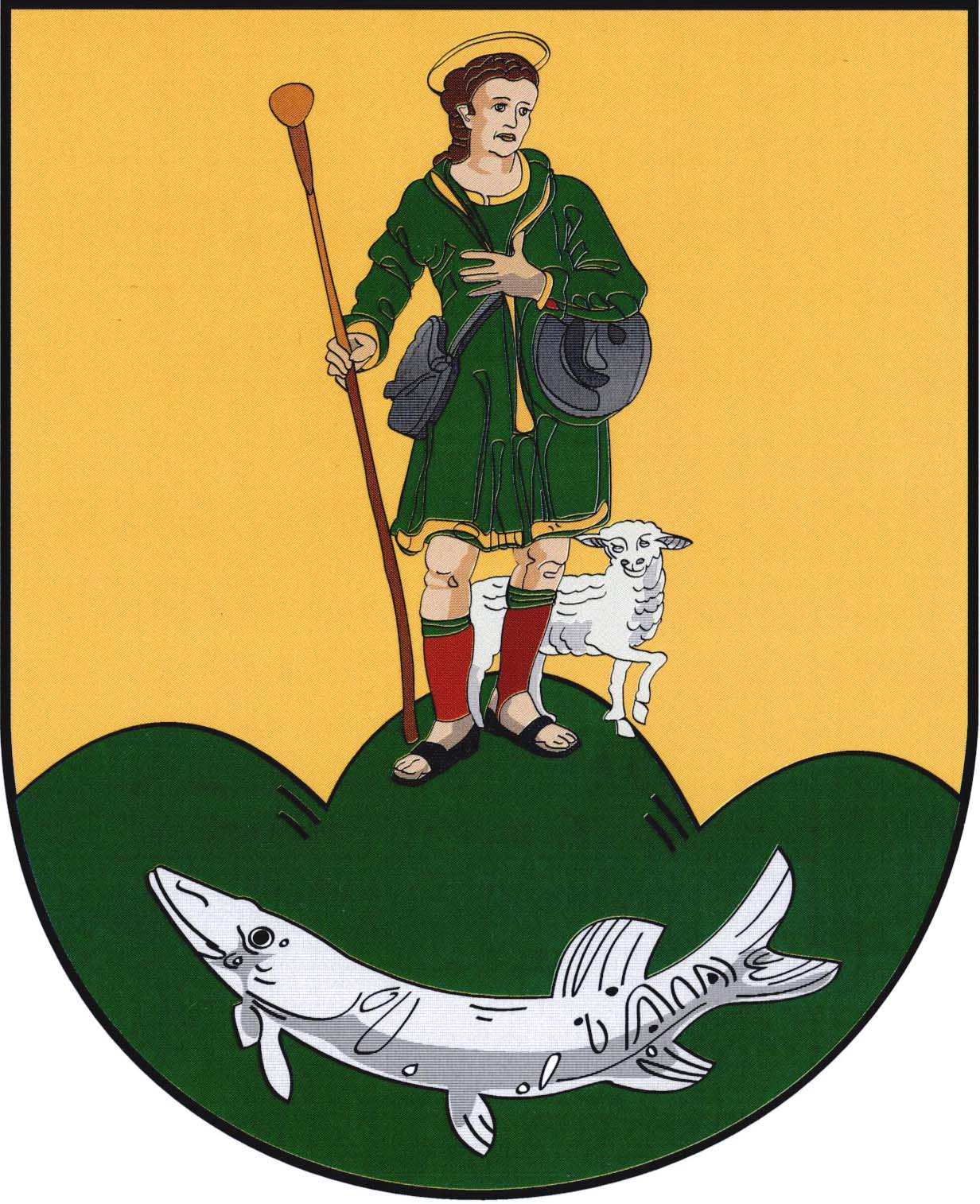
- Flag Coat of arms

- Location in the Czech Republic
- Coordinates: 50°22′54″N 13°6′37″E
- Country: Czech Republic
- Region: Ústí nad Labem
- District: Chomutov
- First mentioned: 1344

Area
  - Total: 20.59 km^{2} (7.95 sq mi)
- Elevation: 365 m (1,198 ft)

Population (2026-01-01)
  - Total: 1,157
  - Density: 56.19/km^{2} (145.5/sq mi)
- Time zone: UTC+1 (CET)
  - Summer (DST): UTC+2 (CEST)
- Postal code: 431 63
- Website: www.obec-perstejn.cz

Perštejn (German: Pürstein) is a municipality and village in Chomutov District in the Ústí nad Labem Region of the Czech Republic. It has about 1,200 inhabitants.

Perštejn lies approximately 23 kilometres (14 mi) south-west of Chomutov, 73 km (45 mi) south-west of Ústí nad Labem, and 99 km (62 mi) west of Prague.

== Administrative division ==
Perštejn consists of seven municipal parts (in brackets population according to the 2021 census):

- Perštejn (717)
- Černýš (126)
- Lužný (177)
- Ondřejov (29)
- Rájov (38)
- Údolíčko (50)
- Vykmanov (13)

== Demographics ==
Historical population
Year	Pop.	±%
1869	2,026	—
1880	2,373	+17.1%
1890	2,422	+2.1%
1900	2,204	−9.0%
1910	2,489	+12.9%
1921	2,563	+3.0%
1930	2,796	+9.1%
1950	1,459	−47.8%
1961	1,432	−1.9%
1970	1,134	−20.8%
1980	1,009	−11.0%
1991	933	−7.5%
2001	1,021	+9.4%
2011	1,080	+5.8%
2021	1,150	+6.5%
Source: Censuses
