= Snědovice =

- Municipality
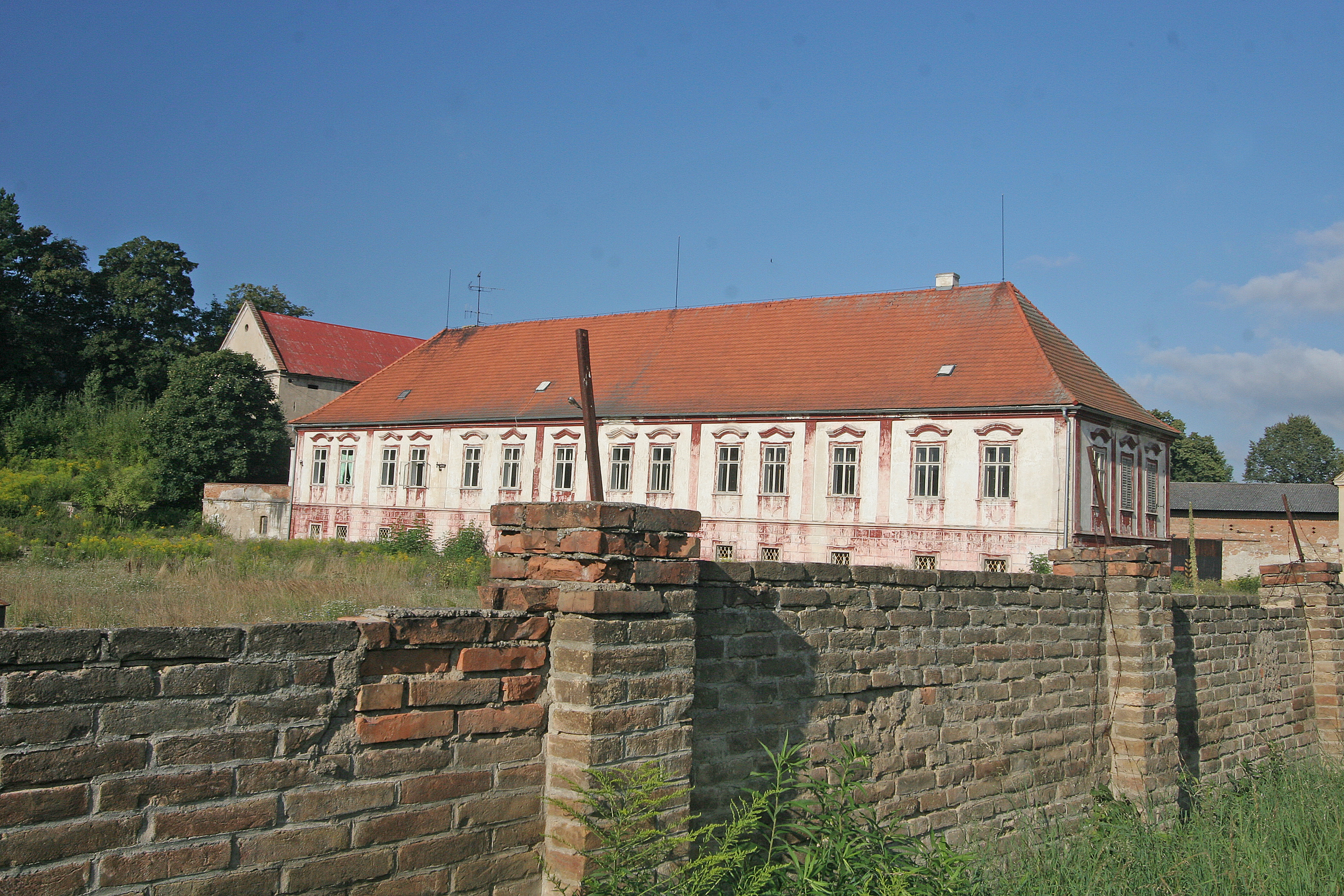
- Sukorady Castle

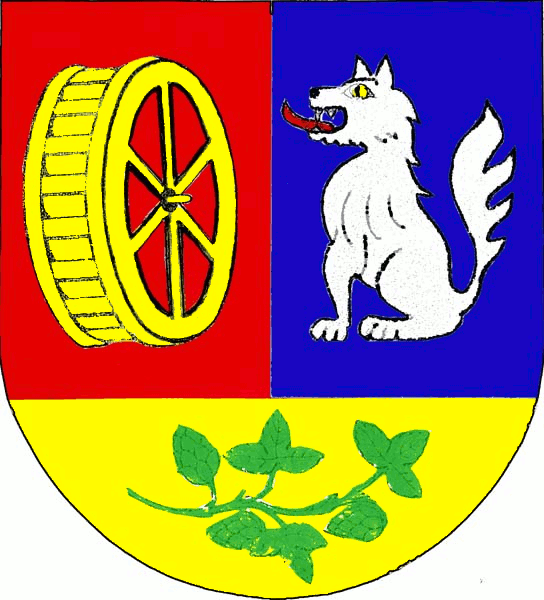
- Flag Coat of arms

- Location in the Czech Republic
- Coordinates: 50°30′13″N 14°23′16″E
- Country: Czech Republic
- Region: Ústí nad Labem
- District: Litoměřice
- First mentioned: 1350

Area
  - Total: 30.12 km^{2} (11.63 sq mi)
- Elevation: 214 m (702 ft)

Population (2026-01-01)
  - Total: 787
  - Density: 26.1/km^{2} (67.7/sq mi)
- Time zone: UTC+1 (CET)
  - Summer (DST): UTC+2 (CEST)
- Postal codes: 411 08, 411 62, 411 74
- Website: www.snedovice.cz

Snědovice (German: Schnedowitz) is a municipality and village in Litoměřice District in the Ústí nad Labem Region of the Czech Republic. It has about 800 inhabitants.

Snědovice lies approximately 20 kilometres (12 mi) east of Litoměřice, 31 km (19 mi) south-east of Ústí nad Labem, and 47 km (29 mi) north of Prague.

== Administrative division ==
Snědovice consists of eight municipal parts (in brackets population according to the 2021 census):

- Snědovice (268)
- Bylochov (15)
- Křešov (73)
- Mošnice (11)
- Strachaly (75)
- Střížovice (115)
- Sukorady (139)
- Velký Hubenov (82)

== Demographics ==
Historical population
Year	Pop.	±%
1869	2,333	—
1880	2,369	+1.5%
1890	2,165	−8.6%
1900	2,067	−4.5%
1910	2,036	−1.5%
1921	1,997	−1.9%
1930	1,991	−0.3%
1950	949	−52.3%
1961	863	−9.1%
1970	739	−14.4%
1980	736	−0.4%
1991	643	−12.6%
2001	700	+8.9%
2011	732	+4.6%
2021	778	+6.3%
Source: Censuses
