= Lukavec (Litoměřice District) =

- Municipality
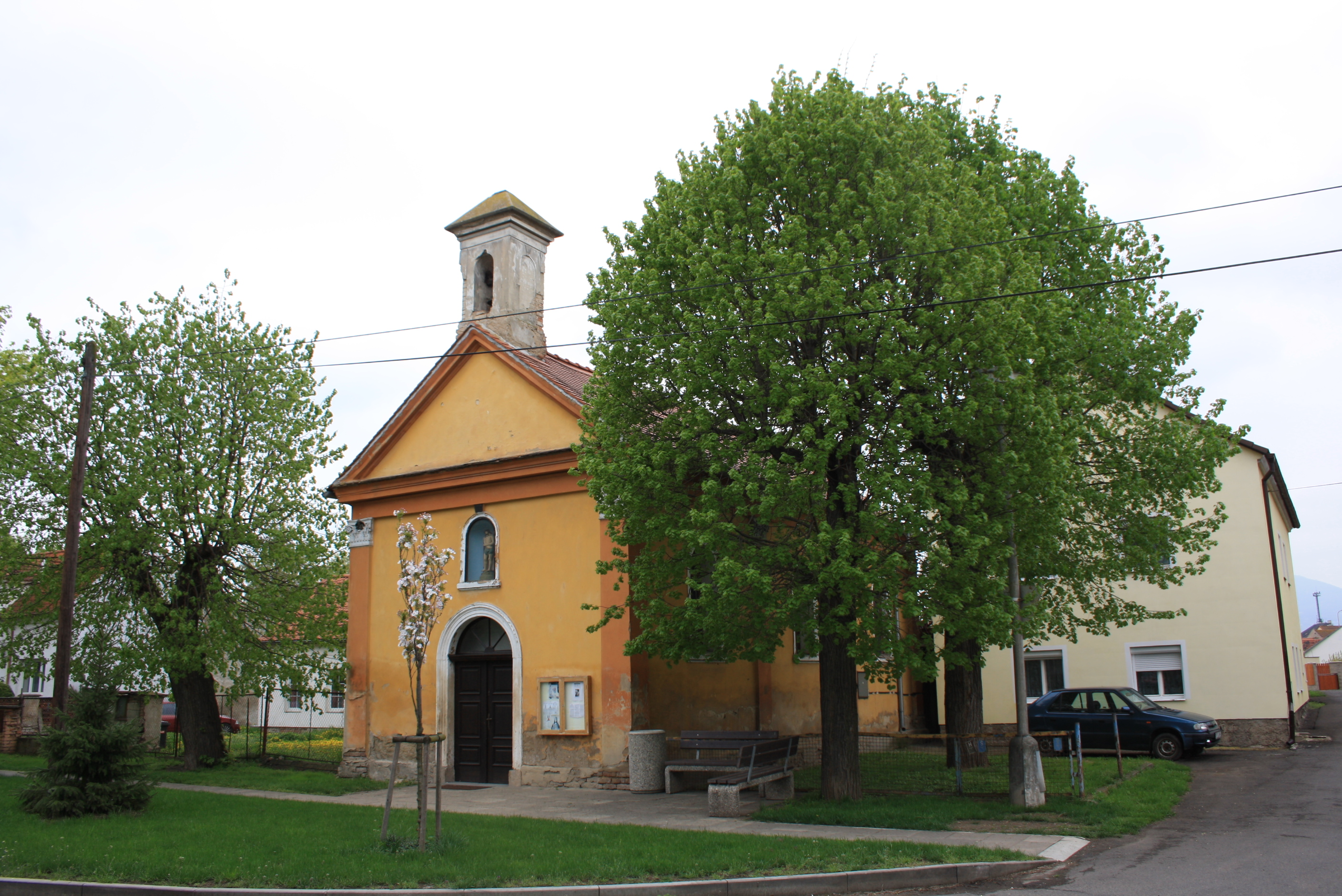
- Chapel of Saint Procopius

- Flag Coat of arms

- Location in the Czech Republic
- Coordinates: 50°30′6″N 14°5′9″E
- Country: Czech Republic
- Region: Ústí nad Labem
- District: Litoměřice
- First mentioned: 1057

Area
  - Total: 3.35 km^{2} (1.29 sq mi)
- Elevation: 147 m (482 ft)

Population (2026-01-01)
  - Total: 367
  - Density: 110/km^{2} (284/sq mi)
- Time zone: UTC+1 (CET)
  - Summer (DST): UTC+2 (CEST)
- Postal code: 410 02
- Website: www.obec-lukavec.cz

Lukavec is a municipality and village in Litoměřice District in the Ústí nad Labem Region of the Czech Republic. It has about 400 inhabitants.

Lukavec lies approximately 5 kilometres (3 mi) south-west of Litoměřice, 19 km (12 mi) south of Ústí nad Labem, and 52 km (32 mi) north-west of Prague.

== Demographics ==
Historical population
| Year | Pop. | ±% |
|---|---|---|
| 1869 | 472 | — |
| 1880 | 490 | +3.8% |
| 1890 | 465 | −5.1% |
| 1900 | 629 | +35.3% |
| 1910 | 714 | +13.5% |
| 1921 | 615 | −13.9% |
| 1930 | 693 | +12.7% |
| 1950 | 456 | −34.2% |
| 1961 | 521 | +14.3% |
| 1970 | 461 | −11.5% |
| 1980 | 380 | −17.6% |
| 1991 | 280 | −26.3% |
| 2001 | 309 | +10.4% |
| 2011 | 356 | +15.2% |
| 2021 | 348 | −2.2% |
Source: Censuses
