= Kyjovský hrádek =

Coordinates: 50°54′40.4″N 14°27′09.8″E

Kyjovský hrádek, also Horní Karlštejn and Pustý hrádek (German: Oberer Karlstein and Wüstes Schloss) is the name of the ruins of what is supposed to have been a rock castle (Felsenburg) near Kyjov (Khaa) in the Bohemian Switzerland in the Czech Republic. The site is in the Kyjovské údolí (Khaatal) valley on a rock terrace above the River Kirnitzsch (Křinice) and covers and area of 150 by 150 metres (490 by 490 ft). Beam supports and the remnants of rooms carved out of the rock are still visible.

== History ==
Nothing is known of the history of the castle site. Castle researchers previously thought that the castle was built in early part of the 14th century.

More recent research now doubts, however, that the site was a castle at all. Ceramic finds date the settlement of the area to the 14th century. It could have served as a place that miners used as a place to live and work, where iron ore was processed and smelted. Old names such as Zlatý potok (Goldbach or "Gold Stream") or Železná jáma (Eisengrube or "Iron Pit"), have survived to the present day in the surrounding area, which indicates medieval mining took place here.

== See also ==
- List of castles in the Czech Republic
