= Vrbičany (Litoměřice District) =

- Municipality
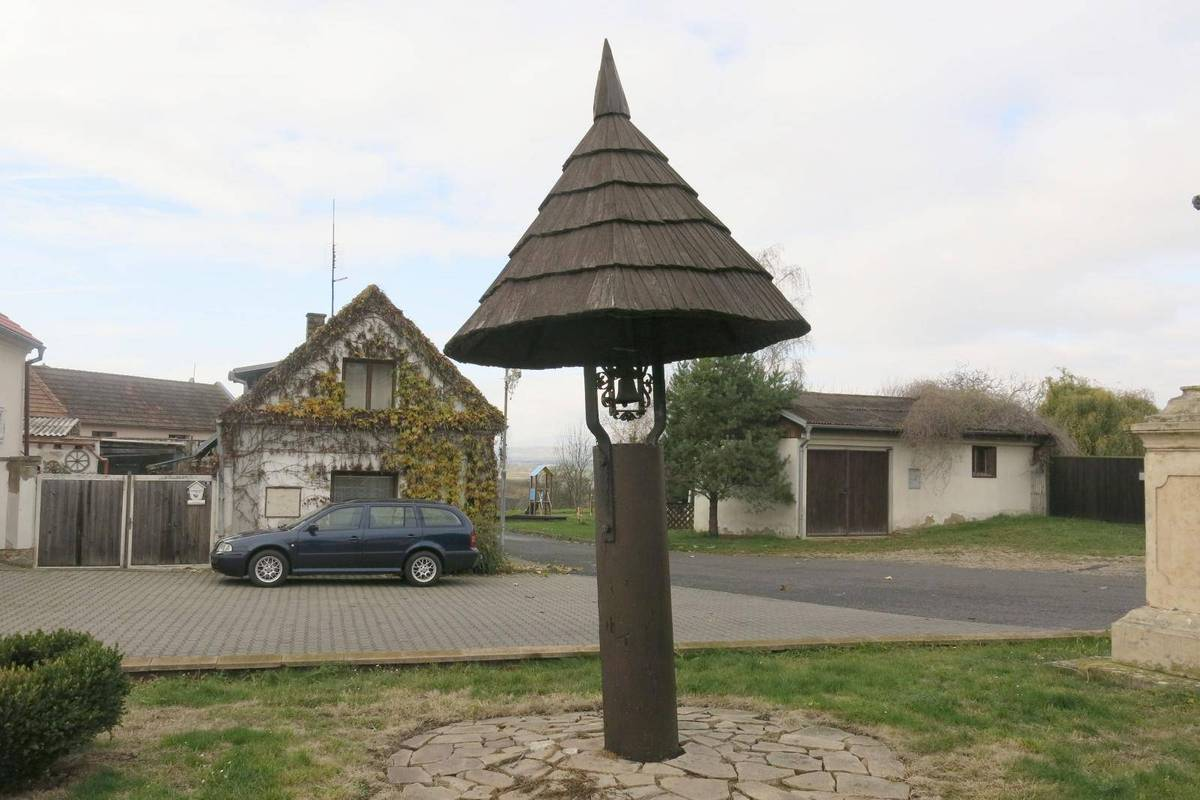
- Centre of Vrbičany

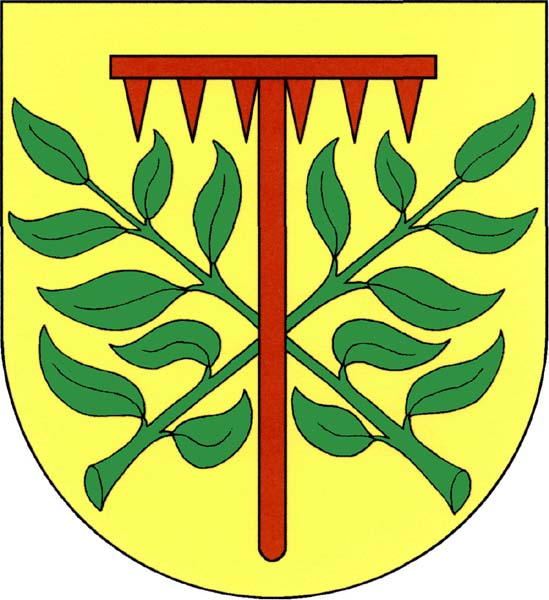
- Flag Coat of arms

- Location in the Czech Republic
- Coordinates: 50°27′46″N 14°5′5″E
- Country: Czech Republic
- Region: Ústí nad Labem
- District: Litoměřice
- First mentioned: 1225

Area
  - Total: 2.41 km^{2} (0.93 sq mi)
- Elevation: 206 m (676 ft)

Population (2026-01-01)
  - Total: 315
  - Density: 131/km^{2} (339/sq mi)
- Time zone: UTC+1 (CET)
  - Summer (DST): UTC+2 (CEST)
- Postal code: 411 21
- Website: www.vrbicany.cz

Vrbičany is a municipality and village in Litoměřice District in the Ústí nad Labem Region of the Czech Republic. It has about 300 inhabitants.

Vrbičany lies approximately 9 kilometres (6 mi) south of Litoměřice, 22 km (14 mi) south of Ústí nad Labem, and 49 km (30 mi) north-west of Prague.

== History ==
The first written mention of Vrbičany is from 1225.

== Demographics ==
Historical population
Year	Pop.	±%
1869	269	—
1880	316	+17.5%
1890	314	−0.6%
1900	312	−0.6%
1910	344	+10.3%
1921	376	+9.3%
1930	431	+14.6%
1950	476	+10.4%
1961	390	−18.1%
1970	374	−4.1%
1980	330	−11.8%
1991	286	−13.3%
2001	294	+2.8%
2011	312	+6.1%
2021	301	−3.5%
Source: Censuses
