= Krabčice =

- Municipality
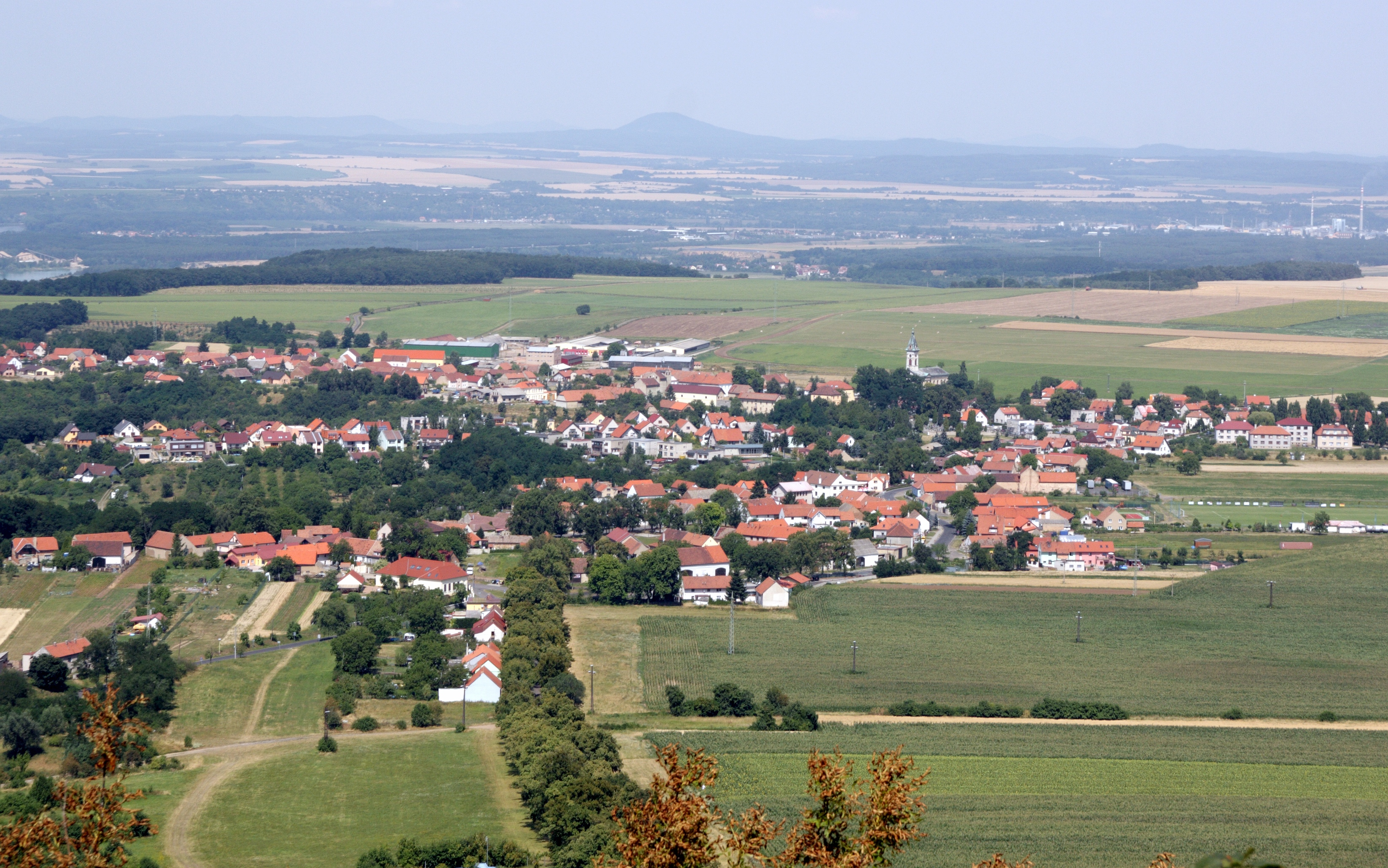
- View of Krabčice from Říp

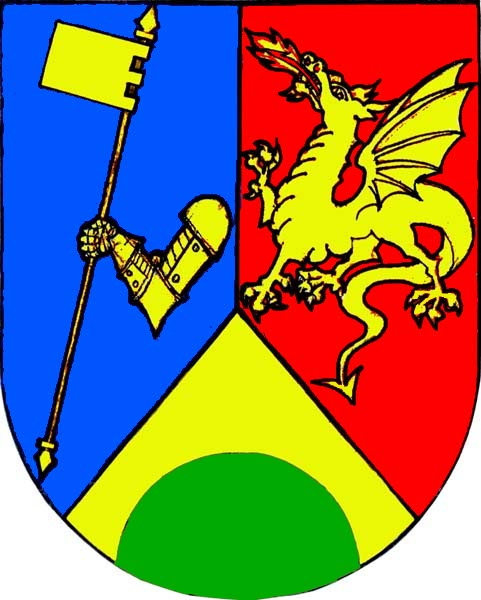
- Flag Coat of arms

- Location in the Czech Republic
- Coordinates: 50°24′20″N 14°18′5″E
- Country: Czech Republic
- Region: Ústí nad Labem
- District: Litoměřice
- First mentioned: 1226

Area
  - Total: 10.31 km^{2} (3.98 sq mi)
- Elevation: 268 m (879 ft)

Population (2026-01-01)
  - Total: 957
  - Density: 92.8/km^{2} (240/sq mi)
- Time zone: UTC+1 (CET)
  - Summer (DST): UTC+2 (CEST)
- Postal code: 411 87
- Website: www.krabcice.cz

Krabčice (German: Krabschitz) is a municipality and village in Litoměřice District in the Ústí nad Labem Region of the Czech Republic. It has about 1,000 inhabitants.

== Administrative division ==
Krabčice consists of three municipal parts (in brackets population according to the 2021 census):

- Krabčice (436)
- Rovné (400)
- Vesce (86)

== Etymology ==
The name Krabčice is derived from the surname Krabka, meaning "the village of Krabka's people".

== Geography ==
Krabčice is located about 19 kilometres (12 mi) southeast of Litoměřice and 33 km (21 mi) north of Prague. It lies in the Lower Ohře Table, in the Polabí lowlands. The highest point is a contour line at the northern slope of the mountain Říp at 320 m (1,050 ft) above sea level.

== History ==
The first written mention of Krabčice is from 1226, when Matěj and Václav Nemoj from the Vršovci family gave the land to the monastery in Doksany. However, it was taken away from Doksany by Emperor Sigismund in order to assign it as a pledge to the Lords Rous of Svinov. At the end of the 16th century, it was purchased by William of Rosenberg. Then it was acquired by the Lobkowicz family, who owned it until 1850.

== Demographics ==
Historical population

Year	Pop.	±%
1869	686	—
1880	803	+17.1%
1890	855	+6.5%
1900	974	+13.9%
1910	1,056	+8.4%

Year	Pop.	±%
1921	1,122	+6.2%
1930	1,129	+0.6%
1950	833	−26.2%
1961	993	+19.2%
1970	912	−8.2%

Year	Pop.	±%
1980	880	−3.5%
1991	852	−3.2%
2001	910	+6.8%
2011	928	+2.0%
2021	922	−0.6%

Source: Censuses

== Transport ==
There are no railways or major roads passing through the municipality.

== Sights ==
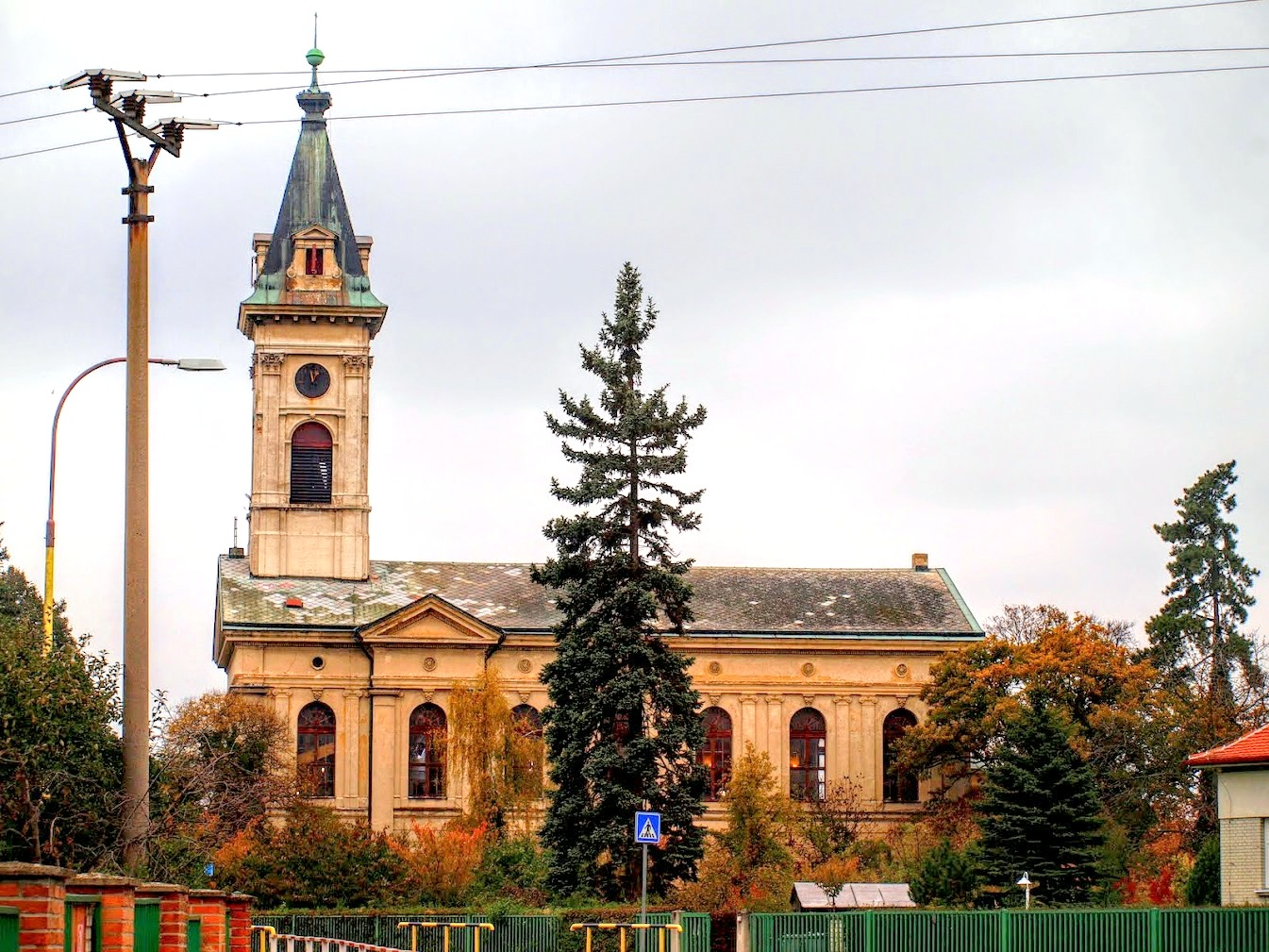
Evangelic church

The main landmark of Krabčice is the Evangelic church. It was built in the neo-Renaissance style in 1885, when it replaced a church from 1790.
