= Třebušín =

- Municipality
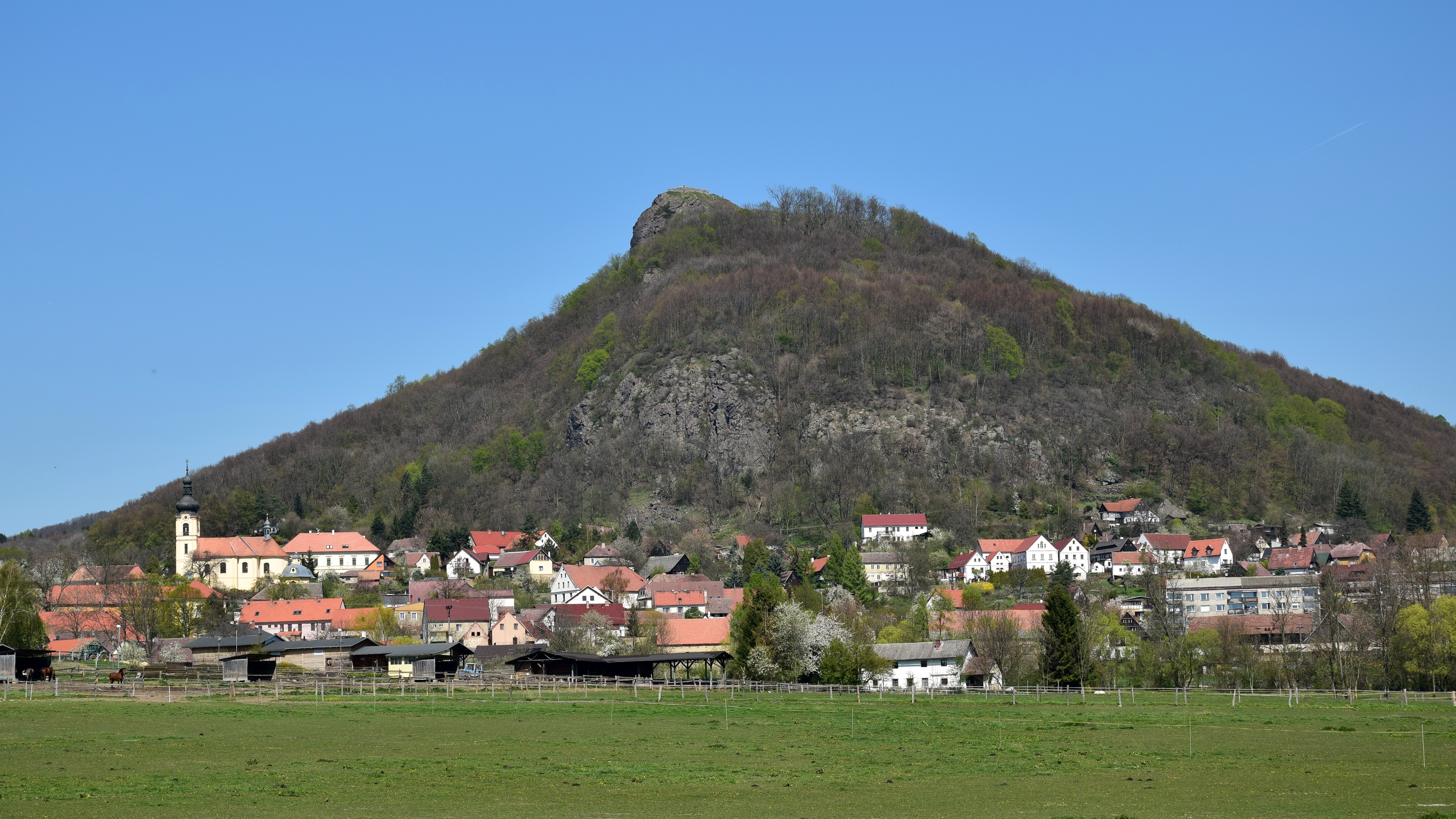
- The village of Třebušín under Kalich Hill

- Flag Coat of arms

- Location in the Czech Republic
- Coordinates: 50°35′59″N 14°12′20″E
- Country: Czech Republic
- Region: Ústí nad Labem
- District: Litoměřice
- First mentioned: 1169

Area
  - Total: 15.62 km^{2} (6.03 sq mi)
- Elevation: 423 m (1,388 ft)

Population (2026-01-01)
  - Total: 630
  - Density: 40/km^{2} (100/sq mi)
- Time zone: UTC+1 (CET)
  - Summer (DST): UTC+2 (CEST)
- Postal code: 412 01
- Website: www.trebusin.cz

Třebušín is a municipality and village in Litoměřice District in the Ústí nad Labem Region of the Czech Republic. It has about 600 inhabitants.

Třebušín lies approximately 10 kilometres (6 mi) north-east of Litoměřice, 14 km (9 mi) south-east of Ústí nad Labem, and 59 km (37 mi) north of Prague.

== Administrative division ==
Třebušín consists of five municipal parts (in brackets population according to the 2021 census):

- Třebušín (372)
- Dolní Týnec (57)
- Horní Týnec (48)
- Kotelice (36)
- Řepčice (77)

== Demographics ==
Historical population
Year	Pop.	±%
1869	1,516	—
1880	1,391	−8.2%
1890	1,498	+7.7%
1900	1,383	−7.7%
1910	1,356	−2.0%
1921	1,301	−4.1%
1930	1,347	+3.5%
1950	637	−52.7%
1961	657	+3.1%
1970	518	−21.2%
1980	505	−2.5%
1991	418	−17.2%
2001	451	+7.9%
2011	545	+20.8%
2021	590	+8.3%
Source: Censuses
