= Mnetěš =

- Municipality
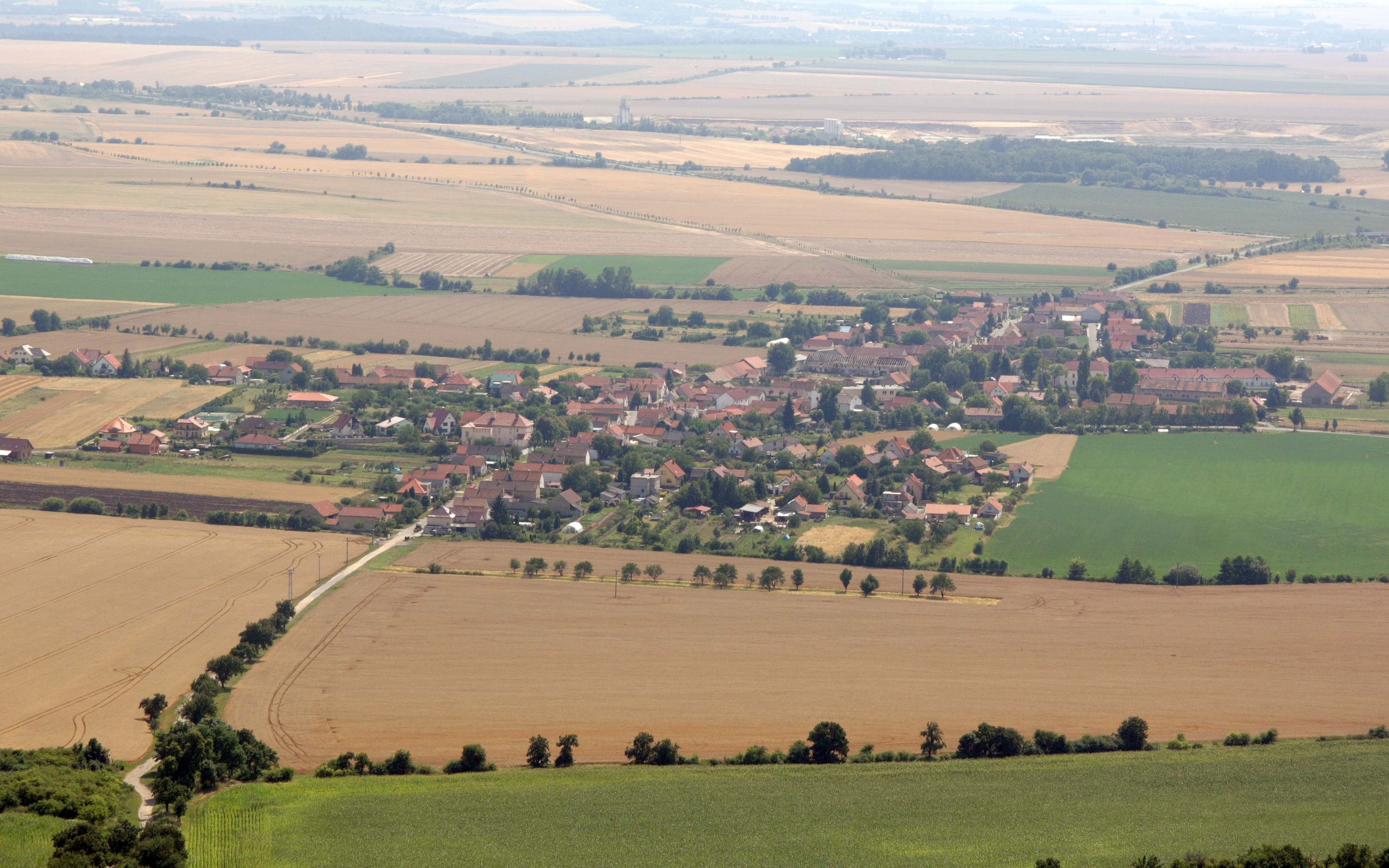
- Mnetěš seen from Říp

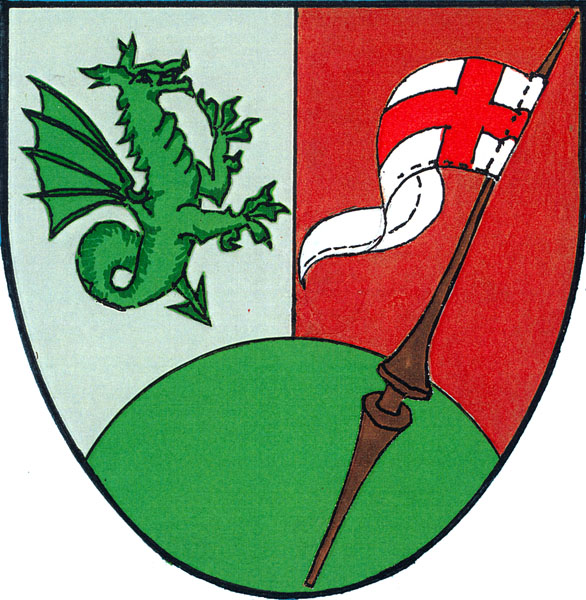
- Flag Coat of arms

- Location in the Czech Republic
- Coordinates: 50°21′56″N 14°16′55″E
- Country: Czech Republic
- Region: Ústí nad Labem
- District: Litoměřice
- First mentioned: 1226

Area
  - Total: 7.65 km^{2} (2.95 sq mi)
- Elevation: 212 m (696 ft)

Population (2026-01-01)
  - Total: 584
  - Density: 76.3/km^{2} (198/sq mi)
- Time zone: UTC+1 (CET)
  - Summer (DST): UTC+2 (CEST)
- Postal code: 413 01
- Website: www.mnetes.cz

Mnetěš (Czech pronunciation: [ˈmnɛcɛʃ]; until 1922 Netěš) is a municipality and village in Litoměřice District in the Ústí nad Labem Region of the Czech Republic. It has about 600 inhabitants. The municipality is located on the stream Vražkovský potok in the Lower Ohře Table.

Mnetěš is known for the mountain Říp and the Rotunda of Saint George on its top. The mountain is connected with the legend of Czech forefather and is protected as a national cultural monument.

== Etymology ==
The village was named after its founder Mnětech.

== Geography ==
Mnetěš is located about 22 kilometres (14 mi) southeast of Litoměřice and 29 km (18 mi) north of Prague. It lies in the Lower Ohře Table. The mountain Říp, connected with the legend of Czech forefather, is located in the municipal territory. With an altitude of 461 metres (1,512 ft), it is the highest point of Mnetěš and the whole Lower Ohře Table region. The stream Vražkovský potok flows through the municipality.

== History ==
The first written mention of Mnetěš is in a deed of King Ottokar I from 1226. From 1603 until the establishment of an independent municipality in the 19th century, it was owned by the Lobkowicz family. The name of the municipality changed several times until 1922, when it was definitely changed from Netěš to Mnetěš.

== Demographics ==
Historical population

Year	Pop.	±%
1869	575	—
1880	652	+13.4%
1890	686	+5.2%
1900	703	+2.5%
1910	700	−0.4%

Year	Pop.	±%
1921	675	−3.6%
1930	737	+9.2%
1950	611	−17.1%
1961	589	−3.6%
1970	546	−7.3%

Year	Pop.	±%
1980	493	−9.7%
1991	416	−15.6%
2001	459	+10.3%
2011	538	+17.2%
2021	550	+2.2%

Source: Censuses

== Transport ==
The D8 motorway from Prague to Ústí nad Labem runs through the municipality.

Mnetěš is located on a railway line of local importance heading from Straškov to Vraňany.

== Sights ==
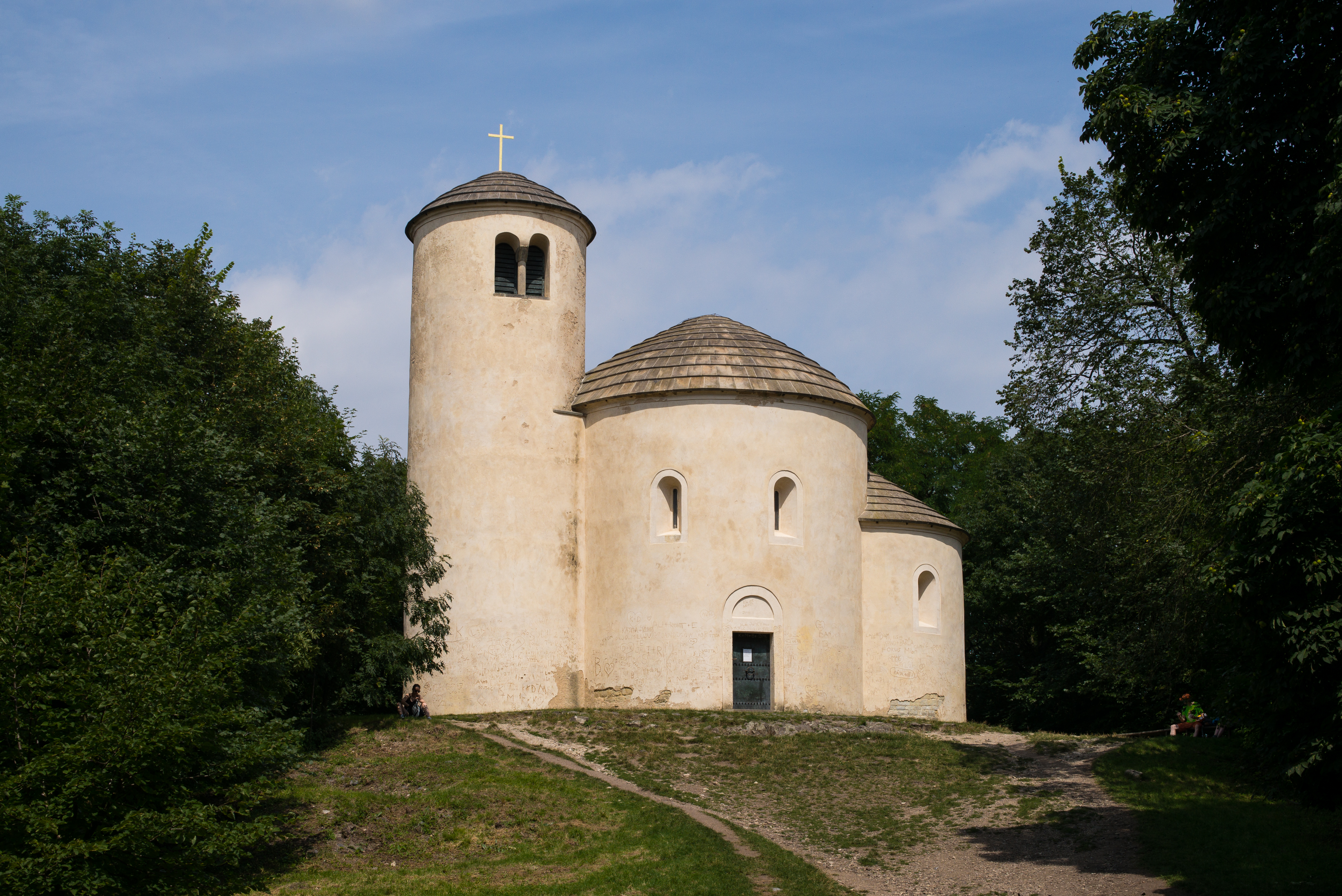
Rotunda of Saint George

The most important building is the Rotunda of Saint George on the top of Říp, protected together with the entire mountain as a national cultural monument. It was built around 1039 and it is one of the oldest preserved Romanesque buildings in the country. The church was extended and consecrated in 1126. The entrance was moved in 1869–1881.
