= Kostomlaty pod Řípem =

- Municipality
- View towards the church

- Location in the Czech Republic
- Coordinates: 50°22′59″N 14°19′59″E
- Country: Czech Republic
- Region: Ústí nad Labem
- District: Litoměřice
- First mentioned: 1285

Area
  - Total: 7.90 km^{2} (3.05 sq mi)
- Elevation: 219 m (719 ft)

Population (2026-01-01)
  - Total: 421
  - Density: 53.3/km^{2} (138/sq mi)
- Time zone: UTC+1 (CET)
  - Summer (DST): UTC+2 (CEST)
- Postal code: 413 01
- Website: www.kostomlaty-pod-ripem.cz

Kostomlaty pod Řípem is a municipality and village in Litoměřice District in the Ústí nad Labem Region of the Czech Republic. It has about 400 inhabitants.

== Etymology ==
The name Kostomlaty was derived from the Czech words kost ('bone') and mlátit ('thresh'). It was a village of people who threshed bones.

== Geography ==
Kostomlaty pod Řípem is located about 22 kilometres (14 mi) southeast of Litoměřice and 31 km (19 mi) north of Prague. It lies in a predominantly agricultural landscape; the western part of the municipality with the village proper lies in the Lower Ohře Table and the eastern part lies in the Central Elbe Table. The highest point is at 269 m (883 ft) above sea level. The mountain Říp, included in the name of the municipality, is located west of Kostomlaty pod Řípem, outside its territory.

== History ==
The first written mention of Kostomlaty pod Řípem is from 1285. At that time the village was divided into two parts, one being owned by Lord Lévy and one being administered as part of neighbouring Ctiněves. In 1352, the village was acquired by the monastery in Glatz (now Kłodzko, Poland). In 1571, the village with the local fortress was sold to the Lobkowicz family.

On 15 March 1575, Emperor Maximilian II exchanged the Kostomlaty estate for the village of Altwilmsdorf (now Stary Wielisław) near Glatz, which had previously been held by the Bohemian sovereign. As a result, Kostomlaty became a royal property.

== Demographics ==
Historical population

Year	Pop.	±%
1869	582	—
1880	645	+10.8%
1890	682	+5.7%
1900	678	−0.6%
1910	694	+2.4%

Year	Pop.	±%
1921	665	−4.2%
1930	728	+9.5%
1950	593	−18.5%
1961	564	−4.9%
1970	529	−6.2%

Year	Pop.	±%
1980	493	−6.8%
1991	401	−18.7%
2001	407	+1.5%
2011	427	+4.9%
2021	414	−3.0%

Source: Censuses

== Transport ==
Kostomlaty pod Řípem is located on the short railway line Straškov–Vraňany.

== Sights ==
The main landmark of Kostomlaty pod Řípem is the Church of Saints Peter and Paul. It was built in the late Romanesque style, probably in the first quarter of the 13th century. The Renaissance tower was added in the first half of the 16th century and modified in the Baroque style in 1748.
