= Libkovice pod Řípem =

- Municipality
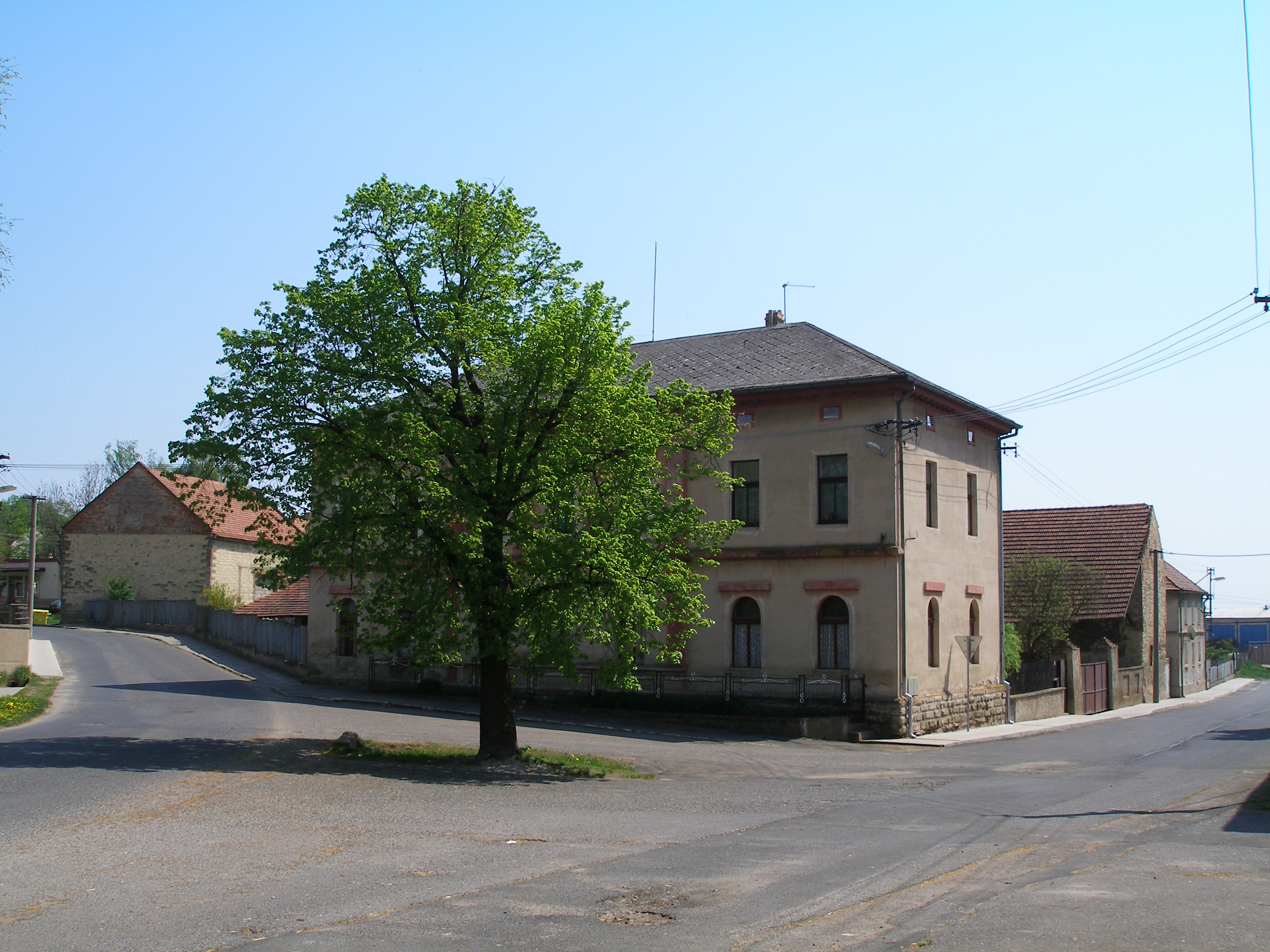
- Crossroads in Libkovice pod Řípem

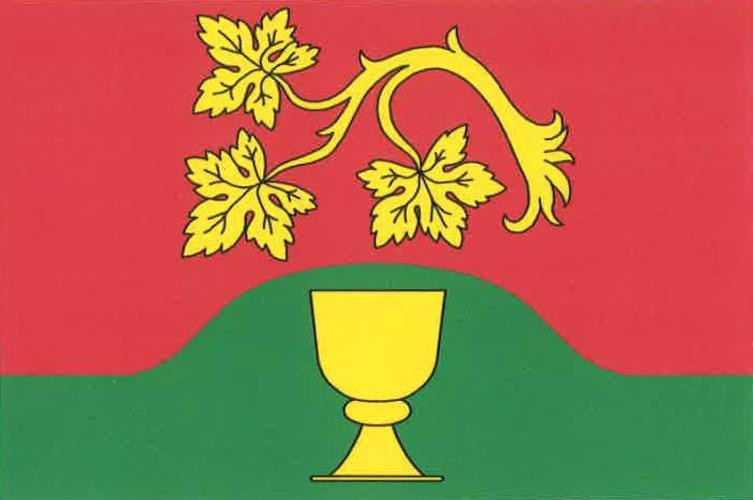
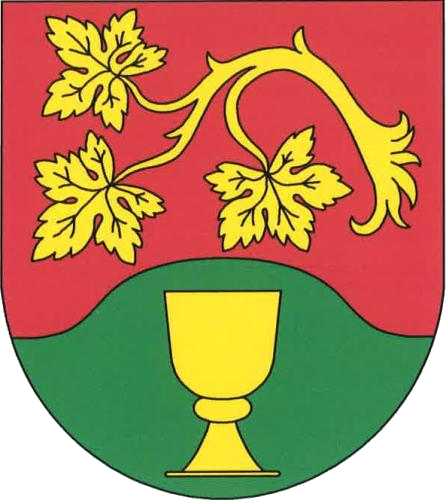
- Flag Coat of arms

- Location in the Czech Republic
- Coordinates: 50°23′33″N 14°20′33″E
- Country: Czech Republic
- Region: Ústí nad Labem
- District: Litoměřice
- First mentioned: 1351

Area
  - Total: 7.95 km^{2} (3.07 sq mi)
- Elevation: 220 m (720 ft)

Population (2026-01-01)
  - Total: 529
  - Density: 66.5/km^{2} (172/sq mi)
- Time zone: UTC+1 (CET)
  - Summer (DST): UTC+2 (CEST)
- Postal code: 413 01
- Website: www.libkovicepodripem.cz

Libkovice pod Řípem is a municipality and village in Litoměřice District in the Ústí nad Labem Region of the Czech Republic. It has about 500 inhabitants.

== Etymology ==
The name Libkovice is probably derived from the name of the first family which lived in this place. The great-grandfather of this family was named Ljubek, so the name of the village was initially Ljubekovice.

== Geography ==
Libkovice pod Řípem is located about 22 kilometres (14 mi) southeast of Litoměřice and 31 km (19 mi) north of Prague. It lies in a flat agricultural landscape in the Lower Ohře Table. It is situated near the mountain Říp, which lies outside the municipal territory. The highest point is at 263 m (863 ft) above sea level.

== History ==
The first written mention of Libkovice pod Řípem is from 1351. The village was probably founded around 1000, during the rule of the Vršovci family.

== Demographics ==
Historical population

Year	Pop.	±%
1869	595	—
1880	644	+8.2%
1890	676	+5.0%
1900	673	−0.4%
1910	679	+0.9%

Year	Pop.	±%
1921	658	−3.1%
1930	712	+8.2%
1950	530	−25.6%
1961	585	+10.4%
1970	526	−10.1%

Year	Pop.	±%
1980	563	+7.0%
1991	463	−17.8%
2001	488	+5.4%
2011	539	+10.5%
2021	540	+0.2%

Source: Censuses

== Sights ==
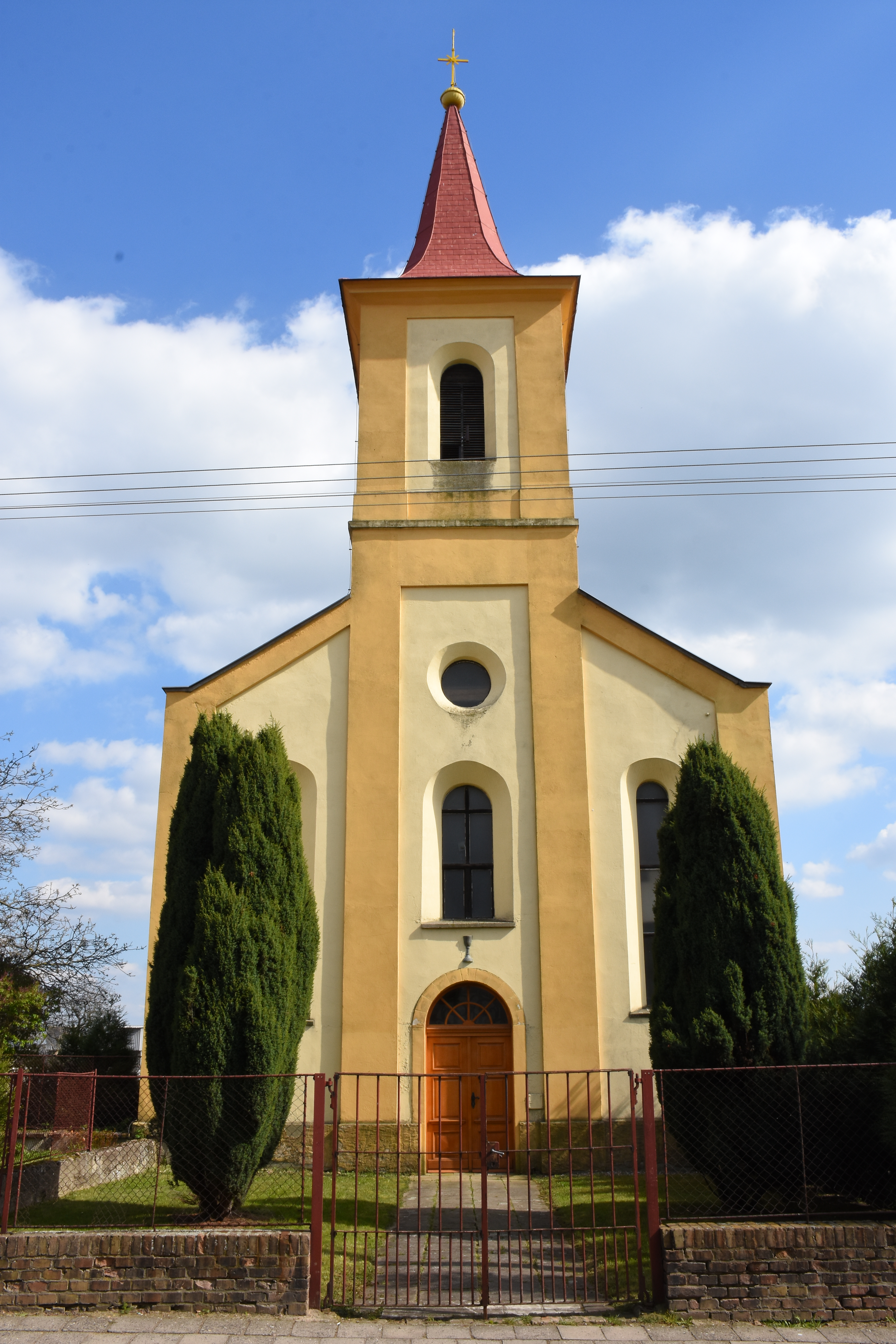
Evangelical church

The Evangelical church was built in 1852–1855. It was the first Evangelical church in the Czech Republic with a tower and bells.
