= Vražkov =

- Municipality
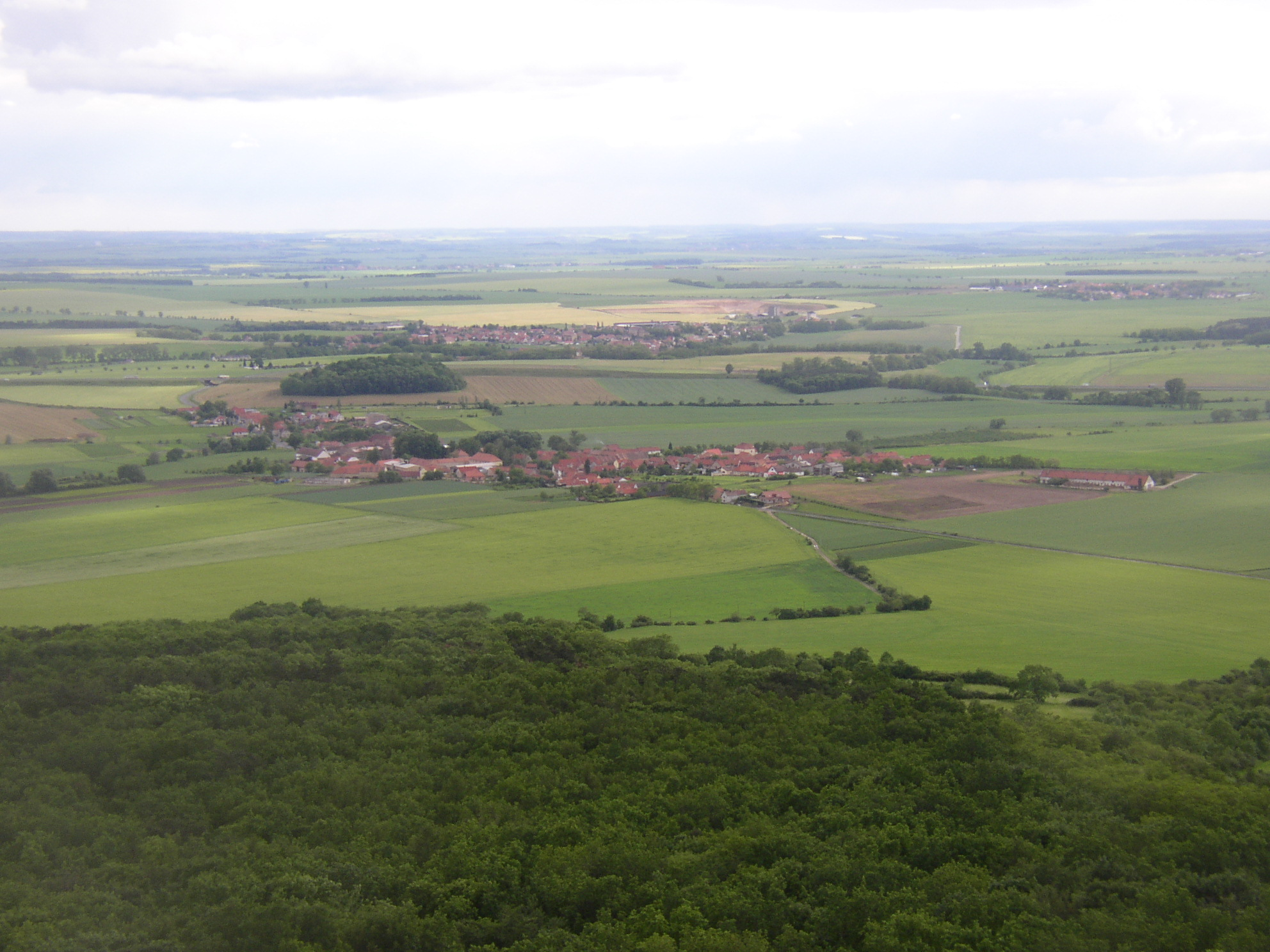
- Vražkov as seen from Říp

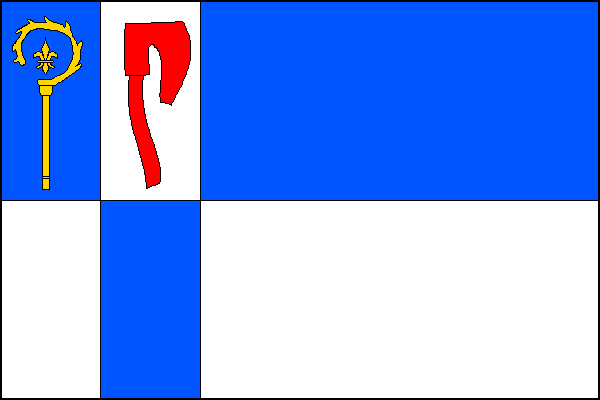
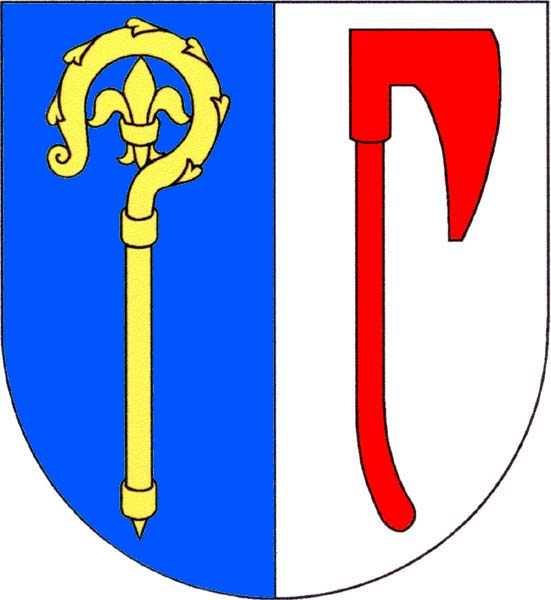
- Flag Coat of arms

- Location in the Czech Republic
- Coordinates: 50°22′25″N 14°16′5″E
- Country: Czech Republic
- Region: Ústí nad Labem
- District: Litoměřice
- First mentioned: 1100

Area
  - Total: 7.63 km^{2} (2.95 sq mi)
- Elevation: 205 m (673 ft)

Population (2026-01-01)
  - Total: 444
  - Density: 58.2/km^{2} (151/sq mi)
- Time zone: UTC+1 (CET)
  - Summer (DST): UTC+2 (CEST)
- Postal code: 413 01
- Website: www.vrazkov.cz

Vražkov is a municipality and village in Litoměřice District in the Ústí nad Labem Region of the Czech Republic. It has about 400 inhabitants.

Vražkov lies approximately 21 kilometres (13 mi) south-east of Litoměřice, 36 km (22 mi) south-east of Ústí nad Labem, and 34 km (21 mi) north of Prague.

== Demographics ==
Historical population
Year	Pop.	±%
1869	451	—
1880	509	+12.9%
1890	557	+9.4%
1900	592	+6.3%
1910	628	+6.1%
1921	643	+2.4%
1930	702	+9.2%
1950	542	−22.8%
1961	535	−1.3%
1970	478	−10.7%
1980	393	−17.8%
1991	390	−0.8%
2001	371	−4.9%
2011	418	+12.7%
2021	405	−3.1%
Source: Censuses
