= Kostomlaty =

Kostomlaty may refer to the following locations in the Czech Republic:

- Kostomlaty nad Labem, a village in Nymburk District
- Kostomlaty pod Milešovkou, a village in Teplice District
- Kostomlaty pod Řípem, a village in Litoměřice District
