= Cítov =

- Municipality
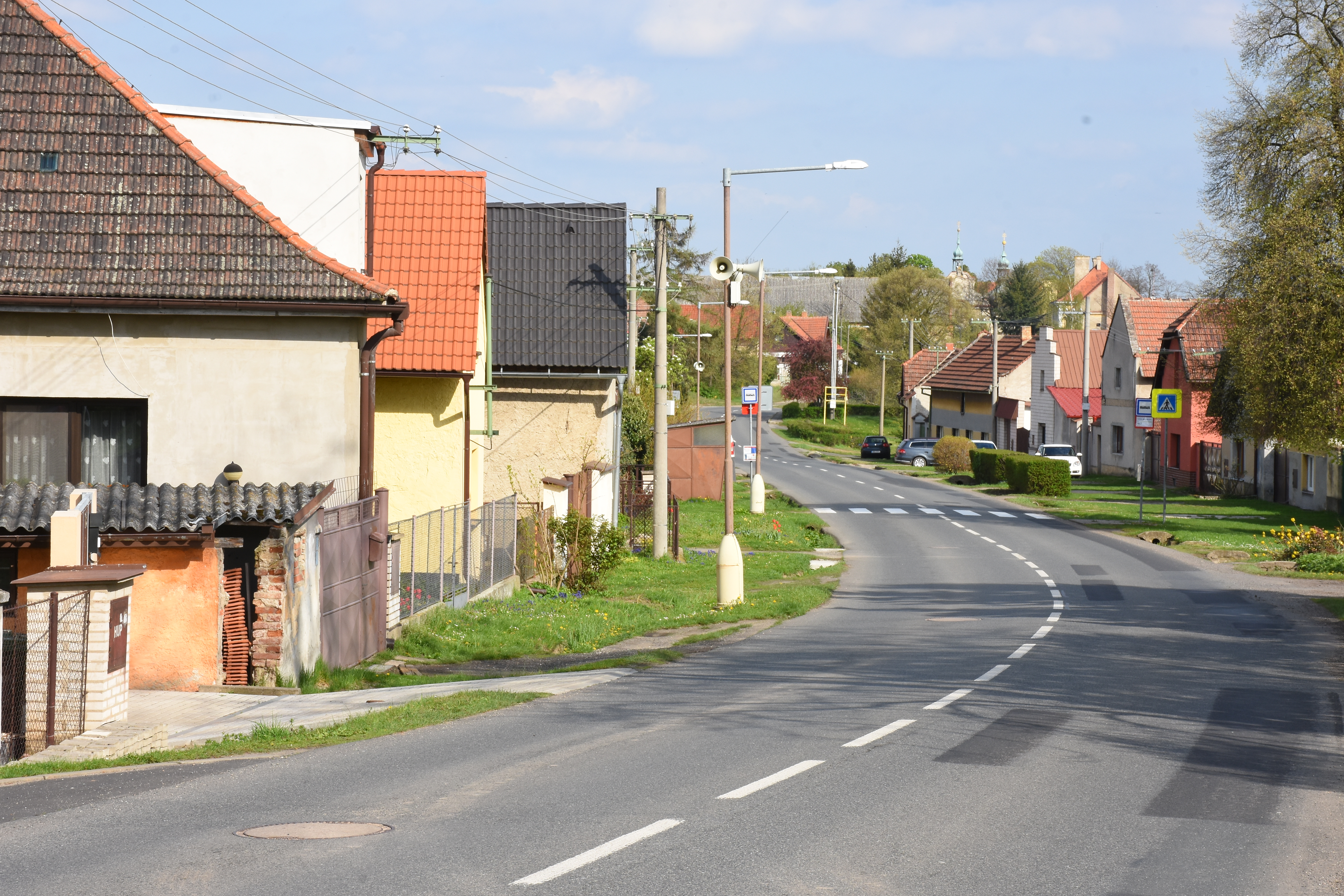
- Western part of Cítov

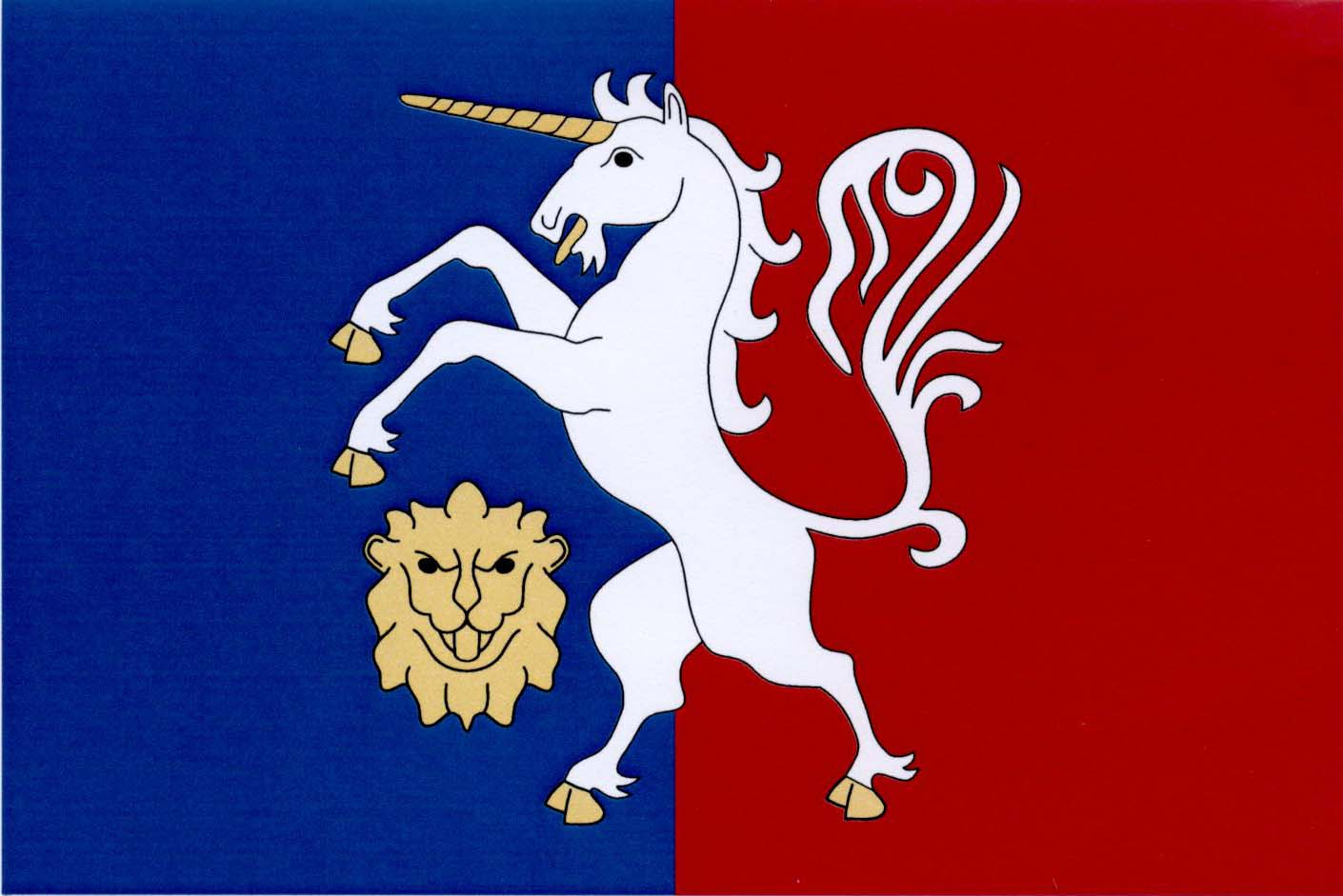
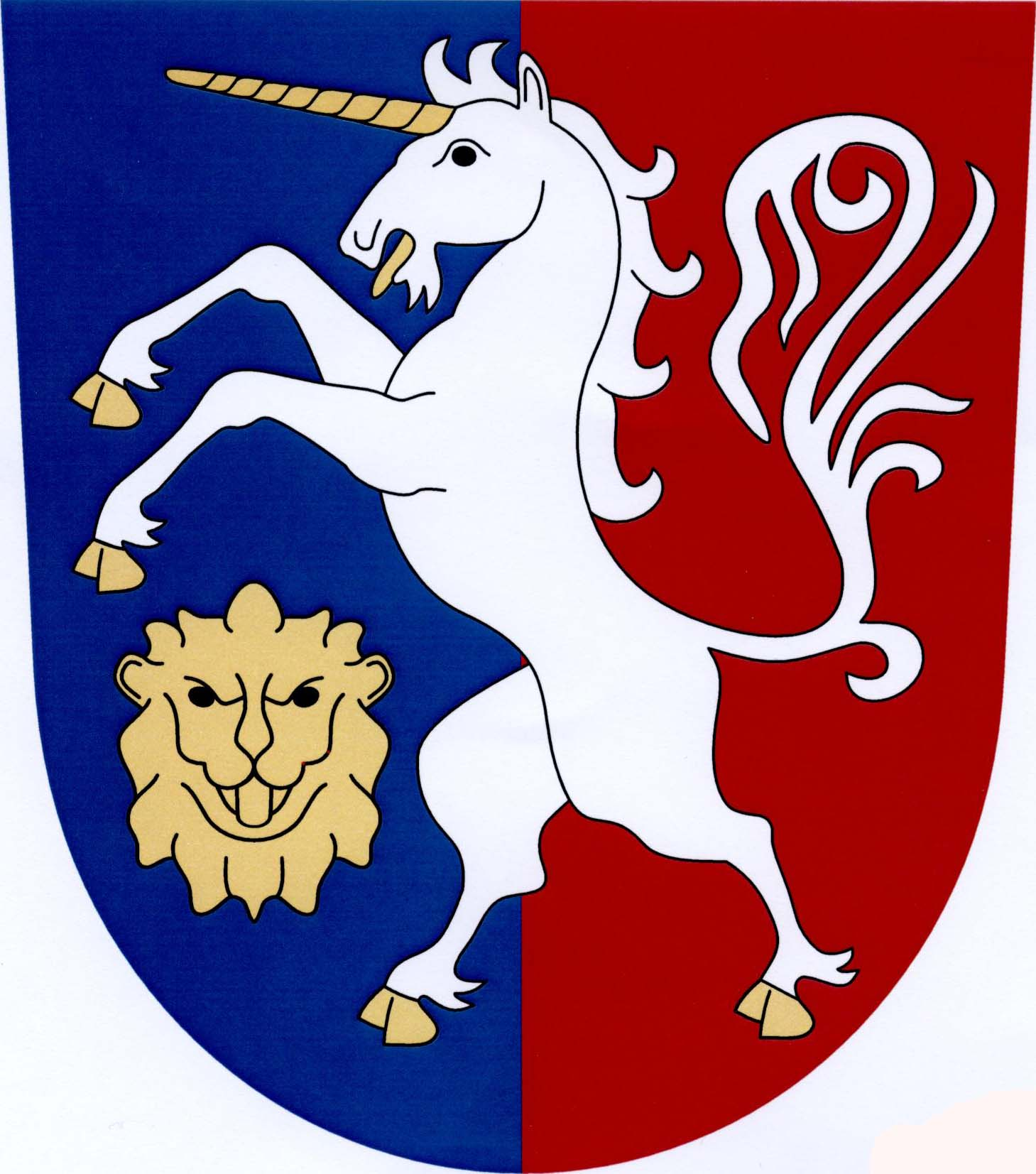
- Flag Coat of arms

- Location in the Czech Republic
- Coordinates: 50°22′20″N 14°23′54″E
- Country: Czech Republic
- Region: Central Bohemian
- District: Mělník
- First mentioned: 1268

Area
  - Total: 15.80 km^{2} (6.10 sq mi)
- Elevation: 181 m (594 ft)

Population (2026-01-01)
  - Total: 1,320
  - Density: 83.5/km^{2} (216/sq mi)
- Time zone: UTC+1 (CET)
  - Summer (DST): UTC+2 (CEST)
- Postal code: 277 04
- Website: www.citov.cz

Cítov is a municipality and village in Mělník District in the Central Bohemian Region of the Czech Republic. It has about 1,300 inhabitants.

== Administrative division ==
Cítov consists of two municipal parts (in brackets population according to the 2021 census):

- Cítov (1,148)
- Daminěves (73)

== Etymology ==
The name (written in Old Czech as Cietov) was derived from the personal name Cieta, meaning "Cieta's (court)".

== Geography ==
Cítov is located about 5 kilometres (3 mi) west of Mělník and 28 km (17 mi) north of Prague. It lies mostly in the Central Elbe Table. The northern part of the municipality extends into the Lower Ohře Table and includes the highest point of Cítov at 240 m (790 ft) above sea level.

== History ==
The first written mention of Cítov is in a deed of King Ottokar II from 1268. From 1782 until the establishment of an independent municipality, it was owned by the Lobkowicz family. The village was predominantly agricultural.

== Demographics ==
Historical population

Year	Pop.	±%
1869	1,384	—
1880	1,489	+7.6%
1890	1,527	+2.6%
1900	1,601	+4.8%
1910	1,582	−1.2%

Year	Pop.	±%
1921	1,562	−1.3%
1930	1,532	−1.9%
1950	1,244	−18.8%
1961	1,194	−4.0%
1970	1,199	+0.4%

Year	Pop.	±%
1980	1,061	−11.5%
1991	950	−10.5%
2001	986	+3.8%
2011	1,162	+17.8%
2021	1,221	+5.1%

Source: Censuses

== Transport ==
Cítov is located on the railway line Prague–Ústí nad Labem.

== Sights ==
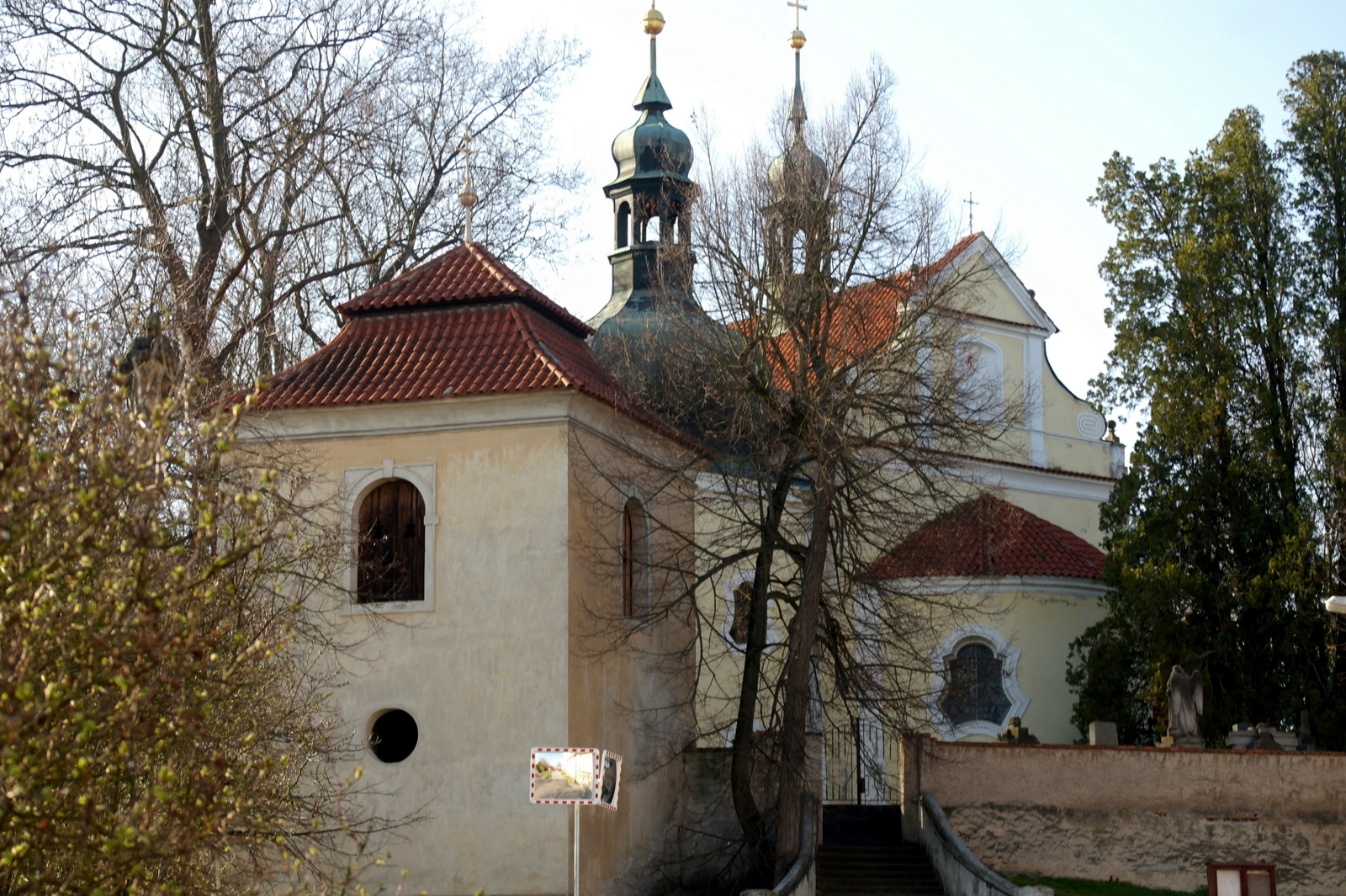
Church of Saint Leonard

The main landmark of Cítov is the Church of Saint Leonard. It is originally a Romanesque church, rebuilt in the Baroque style in 1753. Next to the church is a separate bell tower.
