= Václav Renč =

Czech poet, writer, dramatist and translator

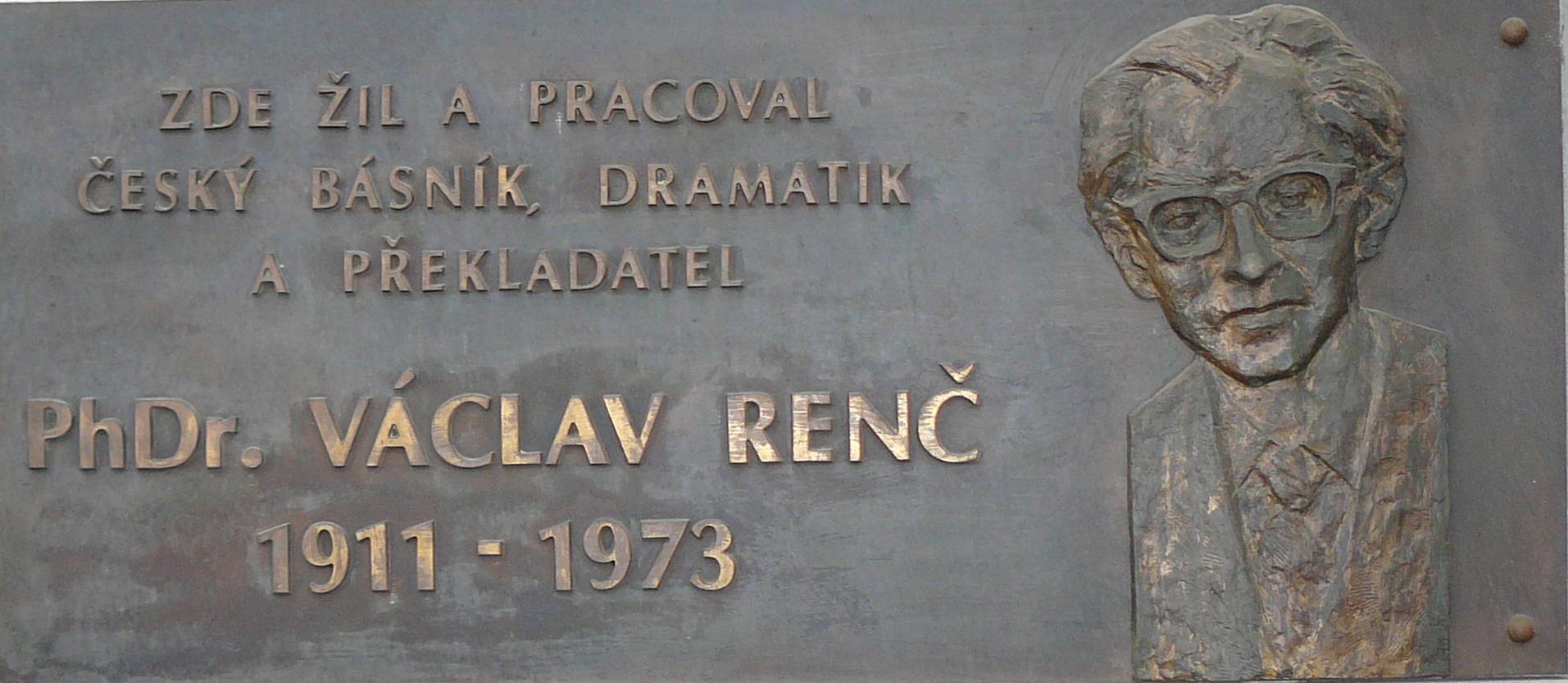
Plaque dedicated to Renč in Fryšták

Václav Renč (28 November 1911 – 30 April 1973) was a Czech poet, children's writer, dramatist and translator. Like other Catholic ruralistic writers, his themes included God, traditions and the countryside.

== Life ==
Renč was born in Vodochody on 28 November 1911. He graduated from the Faculty of Arts of the Charles University in Prague in 1936. He edited the journal Rozhledy po literatuře (i.e. "Views over literature") together with František Halas (between 1933 and 1936). Then he worked as an editor at several journals (Akord, Obnova and Řád), later as a publishing editor. He was also a dramaturgist in Olomouc theatre (1945–1948) and in Zemské divadlo theatre in Brno in 1947.

After the 1948 communist coup in Czechoslovakia he and other catholic writers were hated by the regime. In 1951, Renč was arrested and in 1952 he was sentenced to 25 years in prison without any evidence. He was released in 1962, rehabilitated in 1968. He became dramaturg operetta dramaturgist in Olomouc in 1969. He died in Brno on 30 April 1973, aged 61.

== Works ==
- Jitření, 1933
- Studánky, 1935
- Sedmihradská zem, 1937
- Vinný lis, 1938
- Trojzpěvy, 1940
- Marnotratný syn, 1942
- Císařův mim, 1944
- Barbora Celská, 1948 drama
- Tom Sawyer od řeky Mississippi, 1964, stage play for children based on novel by Mark Twain.
- Královské vraždění: Polonius, tragická komedie o pěti dějstvích, 1967
- Hoře z návratu: Dramatická báseň o dvou dílech, 1969
- Popelka Nazaretská, 1969
- Setkání s Minotaurem, 1969 lyrical poems written in years 1963 – 1967
- Skřivaní věž, 1970 poems written in prison
- Pražská legenda, 1974
- Sluncem oděná, 1979
- České žalmy, 1989
- Perníková chaloupka, 1990
- Kůzlátka a hloupý vlk, 1992 fairy tales
- Loretánské světlo, 1992
- Podoben větru, 1994 summary of poetry
- S anděly si nelze připíjet, 2000
- Vrstvení achátu, 2000

Aside his own work he has also translated from German, English, French, Italian and Polish.

== See also ==
- List of Czech writers
