= Straškov-Vodochody =

- Municipality
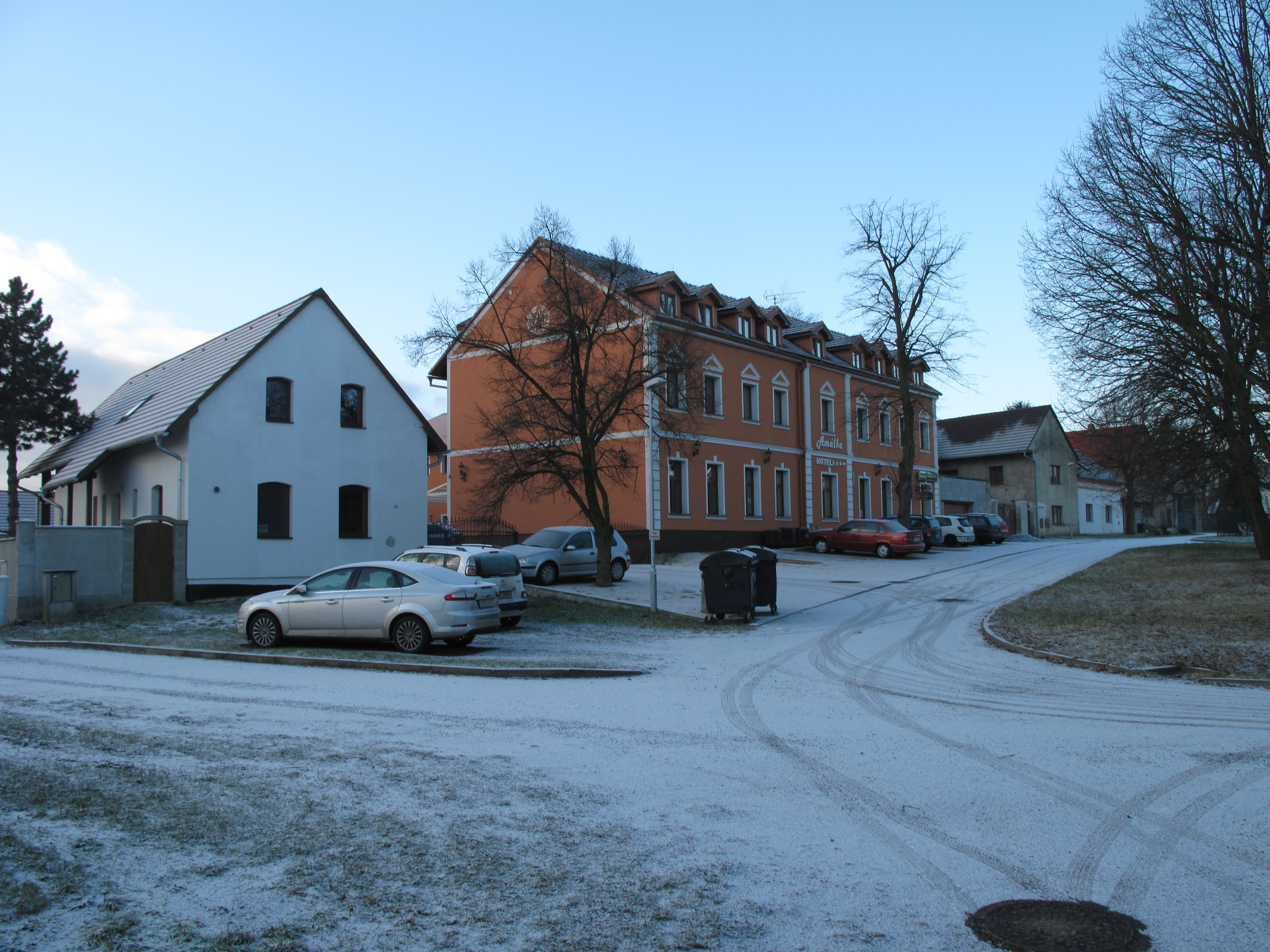
- Centre of Vodochody

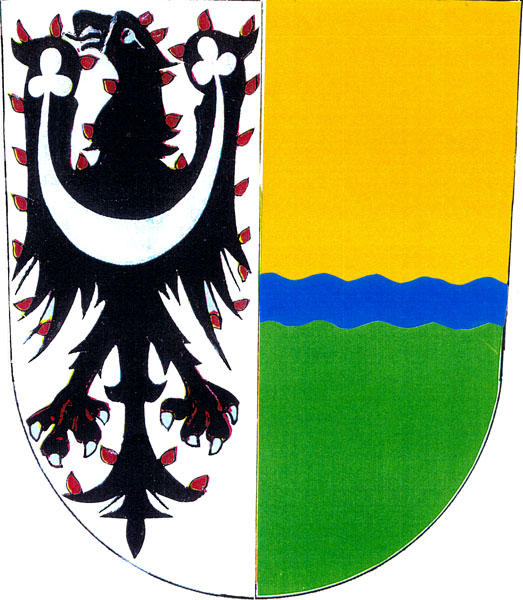
- Flag Coat of arms

- Location in the Czech Republic
- Coordinates: 50°21′51″N 14°15′1″E
- Country: Czech Republic
- Region: Ústí nad Labem
- District: Litoměřice
- First mentioned: 999

Area
  - Total: 8.44 km^{2} (3.26 sq mi)
- Elevation: 205 m (673 ft)

Population (2026-01-01)
  - Total: 1,100
  - Density: 130/km^{2} (340/sq mi)
- Time zone: UTC+1 (CET)
  - Summer (DST): UTC+2 (CEST)
- Postal code: 411 84
- Website: www.straskov.cz

Straškov-Vodochody is a municipality in Litoměřice District in the Ústí nad Labem Region of the Czech Republic. It has about 1,100 inhabitants.

== Administrative division ==
Straškov-Vodochody consists of two municipal parts (in brackets population according to the 2021 census):

- Straškov (632)
- Vodochody (409)

== Geography ==
Straškov-Vodochody is located about 21 kilometres (13 mi) southeast of Litoměřice and 31 km (19 mi) north of Prague. It lies in a flat agricultural landscape in the Lower Ohře Table.

== History ==
The first written mention of Vodochody is from 999, when Duke Boleslaus II donated the village to the Ostrov Monastery in Davle. The first written mention of Straškov is from 1271. The municipality was established on 1 January 1950 by the merger of the municipalities of Straškov and Vodochody.

== Demographics ==
Historical population

Year	Pop.	±%
1869	785	—
1880	818	+4.2%
1890	818	+0.0%
1900	781	−4.5%
1910	899	+15.1%

Year	Pop.	±%
1921	1,013	+12.7%
1930	1,098	+8.4%
1950	894	−18.6%
1961	934	+4.5%
1970	915	−2.0%

Year	Pop.	±%
1980	927	+1.3%
1991	846	−8.7%
2001	899	+6.3%
2011	1,045	+16.2%
2021	1,041	−0.4%

Source: Censuses

== Transport ==
The D8 motorway from Prague to Ústí nad Labem runs near the northern municipal border.

Straškov is located on two railway lines of local importance: Roudnice nad Labem–Bříza and Straškov–Vraňany.

== Sights ==
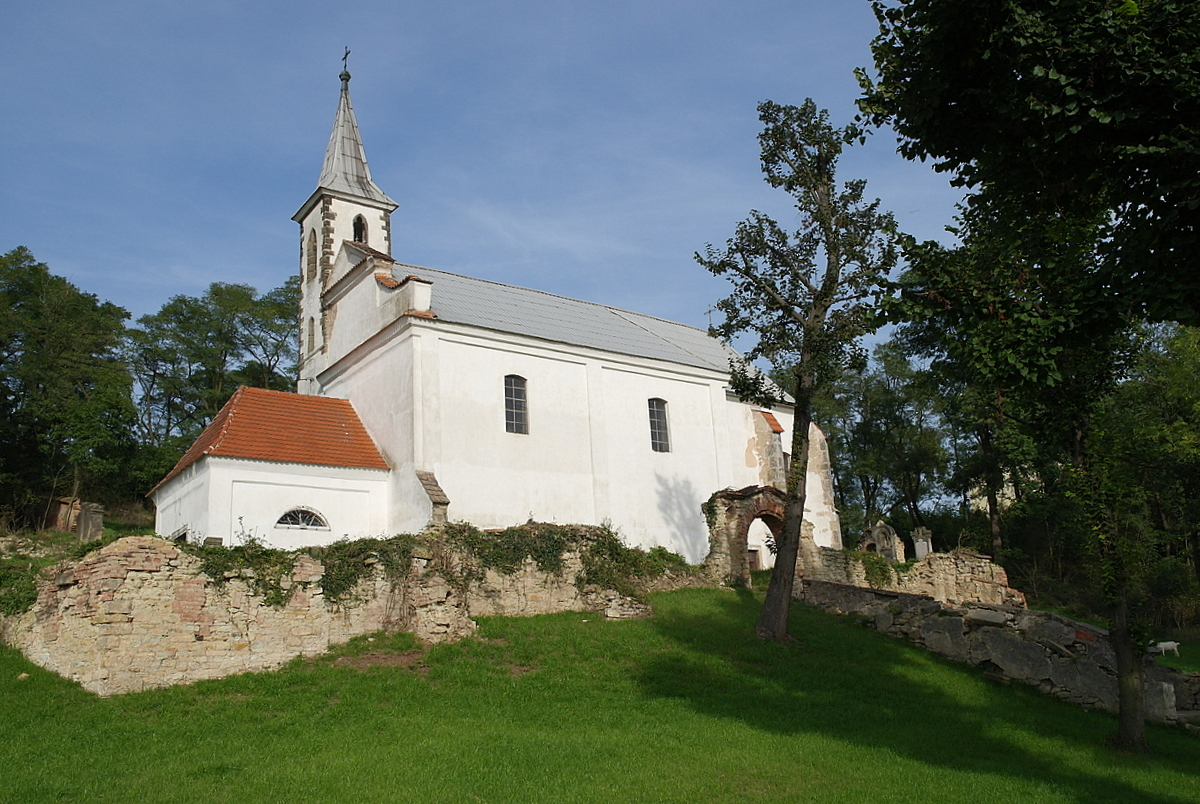
Church of Saint Wenceslaus

The main landmark of the municipality is the Church of Saint Wenceslaus in Straškov. The complex of the original Romanesque church from the 12th century was rebuilt in the Gothic style in the 14th century, but several Romanesque elements have been preserved to this day. In the 18th century, Baroque modifications were made.

== Notable people ==
- Václav Renč (1911–1973), poet and translator
