= Lech, Czech, and Rus =

Legendary ancestors of the Slavic peoples

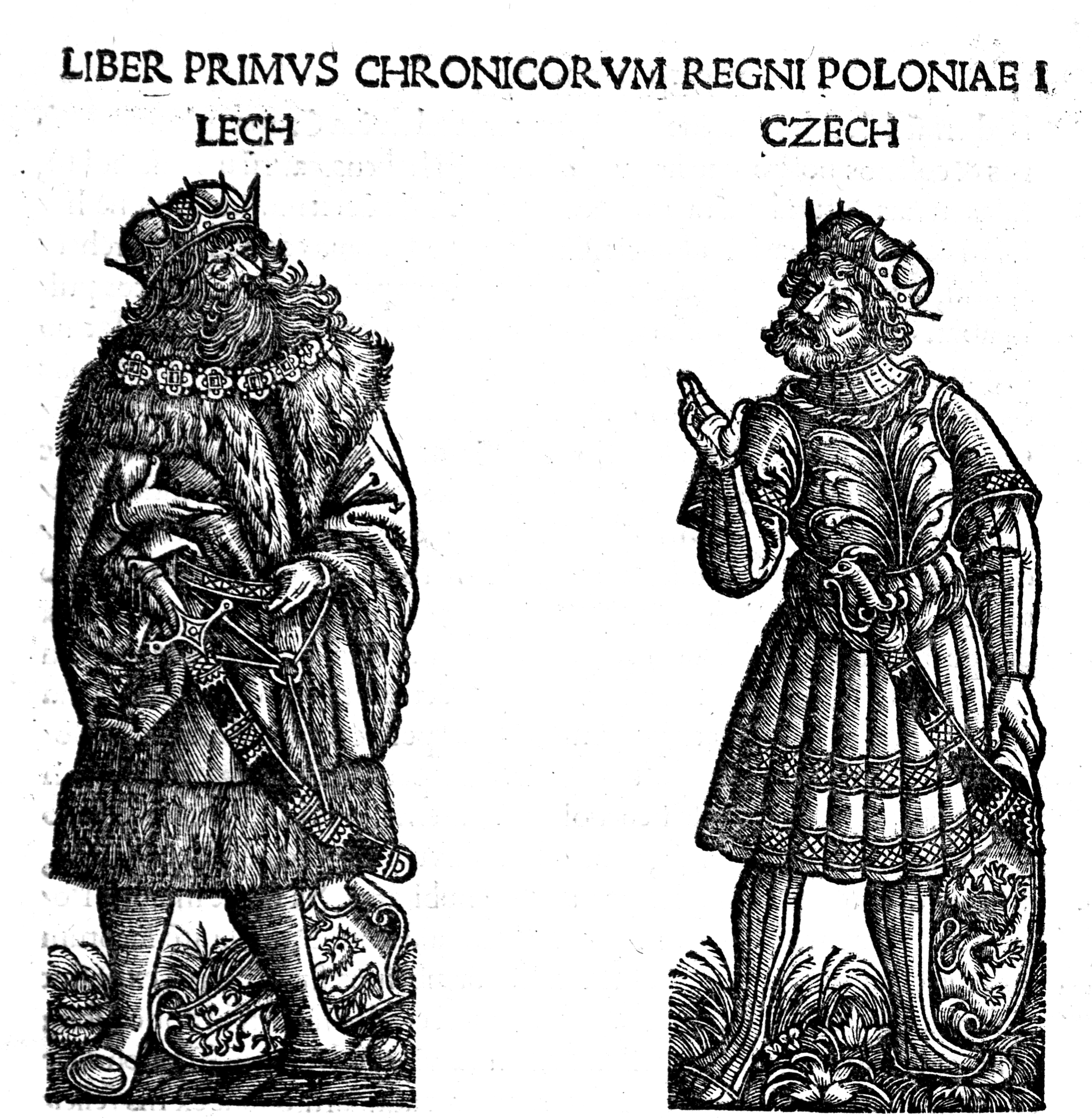
The brothers Lech and Czech, founders of West Slavic lands of Lechia (Poland) and Bohemia (now in the Czech Republic) in "Chronica Polonorum" (1506)

Lech, Czech and Rus (Czech pronunciation: [lɛx tʃɛx rus], Polish pronunciation: [lɛx t͡ʂɛx rus]) refers to a founding legend of three Slavic brothers who founded three Slavic peoples: the Poles, the Czechs, and the Rus'. The three legendary brothers appear together in the Wielkopolska Chronicle, compiled in the early 14th century. The legend states that the brothers, on a hunting trip, followed different prey and thus travelled (and settled) in different directions: Lech in the northwest, Czech in the west, and Rus in the northeast. There are multiple versions of the legend, including several regional variants throughout West Slavic, and to a lesser extent, other Slavic countries that mention only one or two brothers. The Czech version of this legend is the oldest and only mentions two brothers, Čech and Lech. The three also figure into the origin myth of South Slavic peoples in some legends. Their stories are often, to some extent, as well, used as a myth to understand the eventual foundation of the Polish, Czech and Ruthenian states, in accordance with the legend.

== Polish version ==
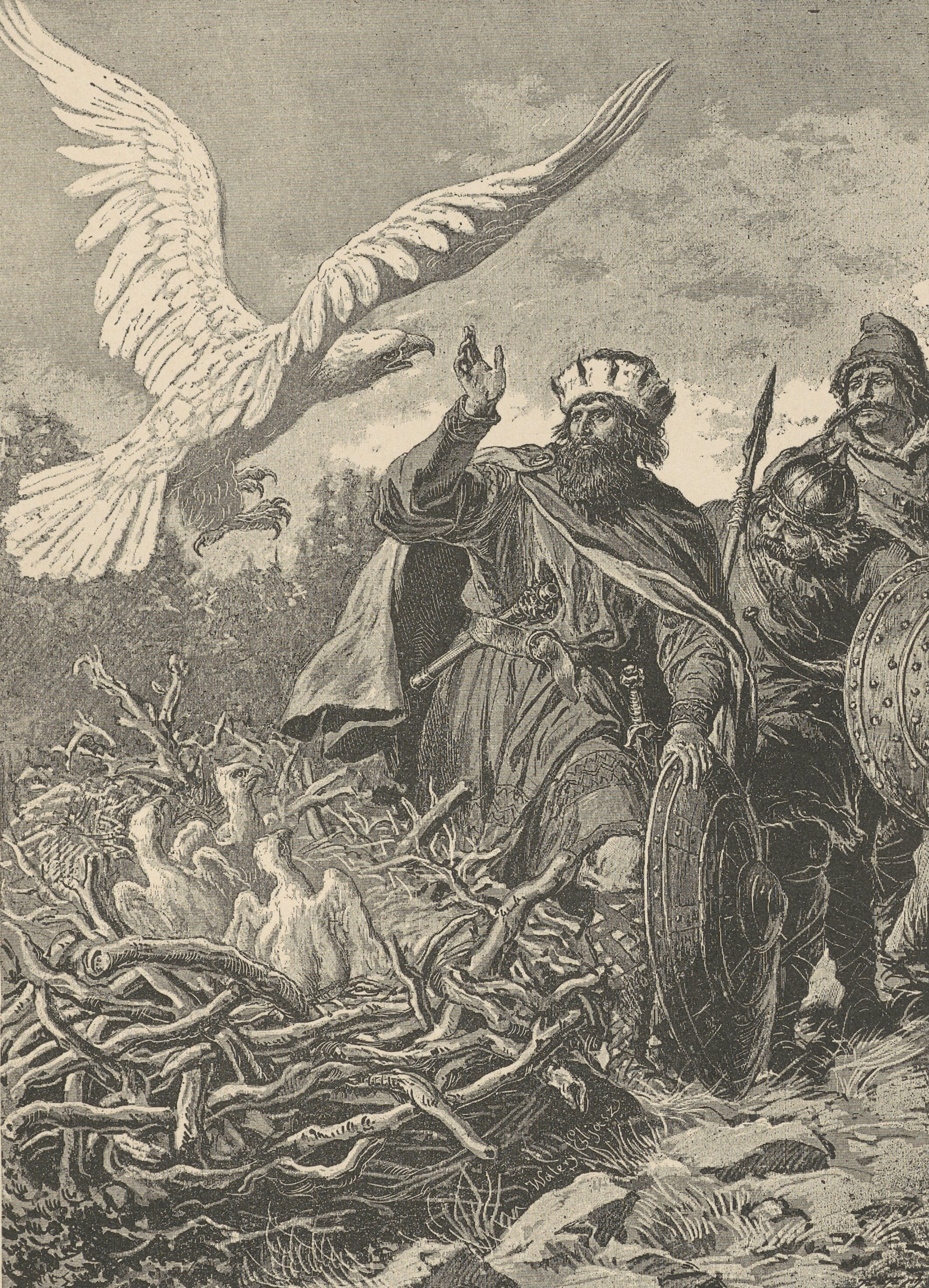
Lech, Czech, Rus and the White Eagle, as painted by Walery Eljasz-Radzikowski (1841–1905)

In the Polish version of the legend, three brothers go hunting together, but each follows a different prey, and eventually, they travel in different directions. Rus went to the east, Čech headed west to settle on Říp, a mountain rising from the Bohemian hilly countryside, while Lech travelled north. While hunting, Lech followed his arrow and suddenly found himself face-to-face with a fierce, white eagle guarding its nest from intruders. Seeing the eagle against the red of the setting sun, Lech took this as a good omen and decided to settle there. He named his gród ("fortified settlement") Gniezno (Polish: gniazdo "nest") in commemoration and adopted the White Eagle as his coat-of-arms. The white eagle remains a symbol of Poland to this day, and the colors of the eagle and the setting sun are depicted in the coat of arms of Poland, as well as its flag, with a white stripe on top for the eagle, and a red stripe on the bottom for the sunset. Lech founded the Polish Kingdom at the beginning of the fifth century.

According to the 13th century Wielkopolska Chronicle, Slavs are descendants of Prince Pan of Pannonia. He had three sons – Lech (the youngest), Rus, and Čech (the oldest), who decided to settle north, east, and west, respectively.

== Czech version ==
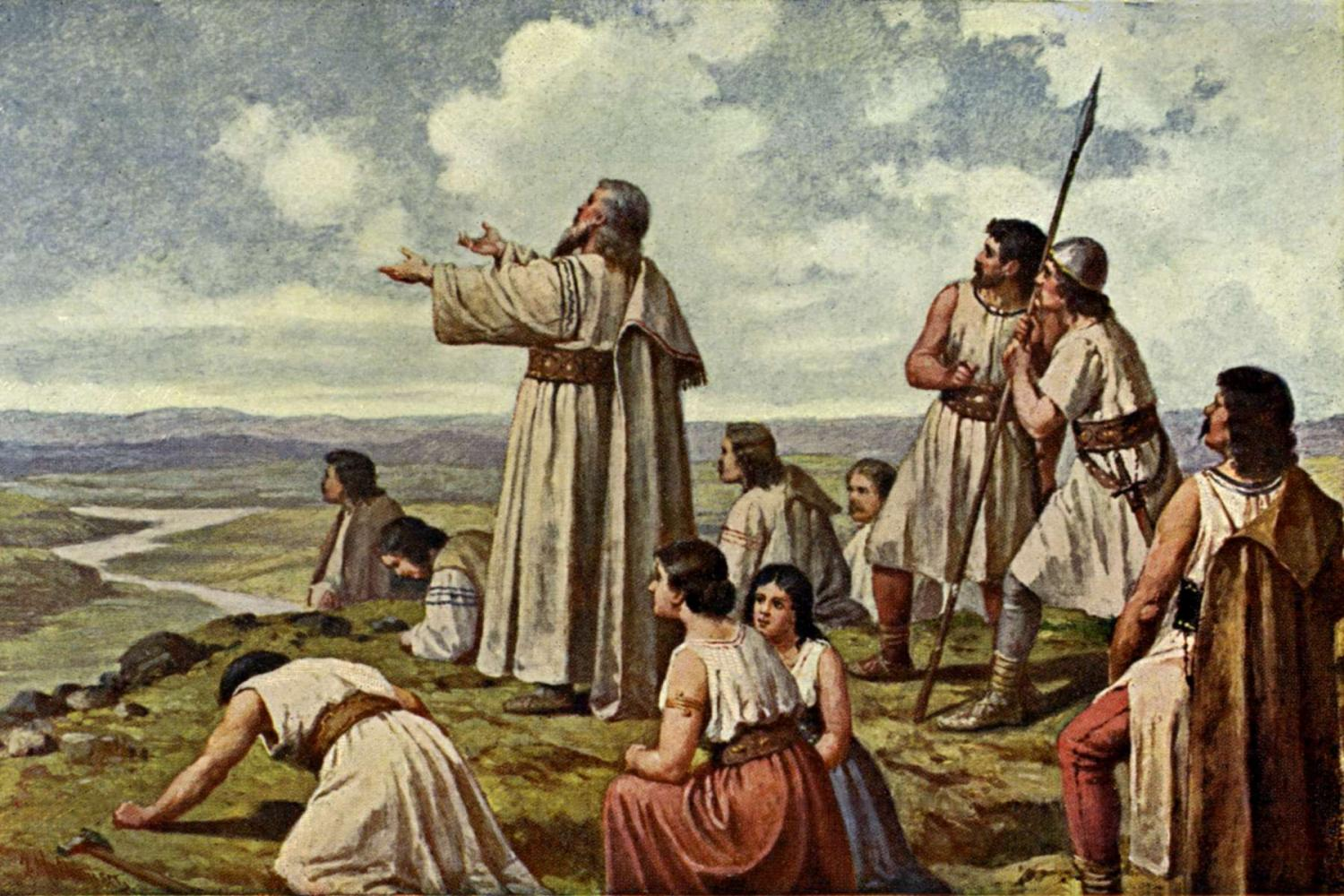
Čech on Říp Mountain

A variant of this legend, involving only two brothers (and three sisters), is also known in the Czech Republic. As in the Polish version, Čech is identified as the founder of the Czech nation (Češi pl.) and Lech as the founder of the Polish nation. Zdeněk Nejedlý argued that Cosmas of Prague's Chronica Boemorum (12th century) described Čech's arrival from Northeastern Bohemia, once called White Croatia. The older chronicles from 14th century (such as those of Dalimil, Wenceslaus Hajek and Přibík Pulkava z Radenína) do not specify the location of Čech and Lech's homeland Charvaty, but in the Alois Jirásek retelling of Staré pověsti české (Old Bohemian Legends) from 1894 it is more closely determined; Za Tatrami, v rovinách při řece Visle rozkládala se od nepaměti charvátská země, část prvotní veliké vlasti slovanské (Behind the Tatra Mountains, in the plains of the river Vistula, stretched from immemorial time Charvátská country (probably meaning so-called Great or White Croatia), the initial part of the great Slavic homeland), and V té charvátské zemi bytovala četná plemena, příbuzná jazykem, mravy, způsobem života (In Charvátská existed numerous tribes, related by language, manners, and way of life). In the same century, Charles IV, Holy Roman Emperor in 1347 claimed "seniority of Croatian". Dušan Třeštík saw parallels of number seven and else in the Croatian origo gentis of five brothers and two sisters from the 30th chapter of De Administrando Imperio by Constantine VII (10th century).

However, numerous battles had made the country very unfavourable for the people, who were accustomed to living in peace, cultivating the land and growing grain. According to other versions, the reason was that Čech had been accused of murder. They gathered their people and set off towards the sunset. According to the Chronicle of Dalimil (1314), when Čech and his people climbed Říp Mountain, he looked upon the landscape and told his six brothers that they have reached the promised land: a country where there are enough beasts, birds, fish, and bees so that their tables will be always full, and where they could defend themselves against enemies. He settled in the area with a tribe and, according to the Přibík Pulkava version (circa 1374), his brother Lech continued his journey to the lowlands over the snowy mountains of the north, where he founded Poland.

Wenceslaus Hajek's version from 1541 adds many (probably fanciful) details not found in other sources. According to Hájek, the brothers were dukes who had already owned castles in their homeland before their arrival in the region and date their arrival to the year 644.

== Croatian version ==
A similar legend with partly changed names (Čeh, Leh, Meh and sister Vilina) was also recorded in folk tales in the Kajkavian dialect of Krapina, in Zagorje (northern Croatia). However, some believe it isn't of ancient origin, but was rather introduced among commoners by literary people starting in the 16th century. Hajek was the first to mention Krapina as Leh's place of origin, while Čeh ruled over Psar near the stream or river Krupa; meanwhile Klemens Janicki wrote that Lech emigrated from the island Hvar in Dalmatia. Already by the 16th century Vinko Pribojević, Faust Vrančić, Mavro Orbini and others from today's Croatia wrote that Čeh and Leh arrived from "Croatia", and related the Czech and Polish languages with Croatian; Juraj Ratkaj was the first to assert that Čeh, Leh, and Meh's origin is in Krapina. Many wrote about it, including Johann Christoph Jordan who came to Krapina to hear it told by the local people and mentioned it in De Originibus Slavicis (1745). In 1702 the three brothers featured in a theatre play, and in 1848 on the coat of arms of Varaždin county, and the flag present during the office inauguration of Josip Jelačić; the legend was further especially popularized by Ljudevit Gaj, while Stjepan Ortner published the legend in full form in 1899. This legend was one of the reasons Croatian language was chosen in the 17th century as the common Slavic language for Catholic books for all Slavic nations.

== Debate ==
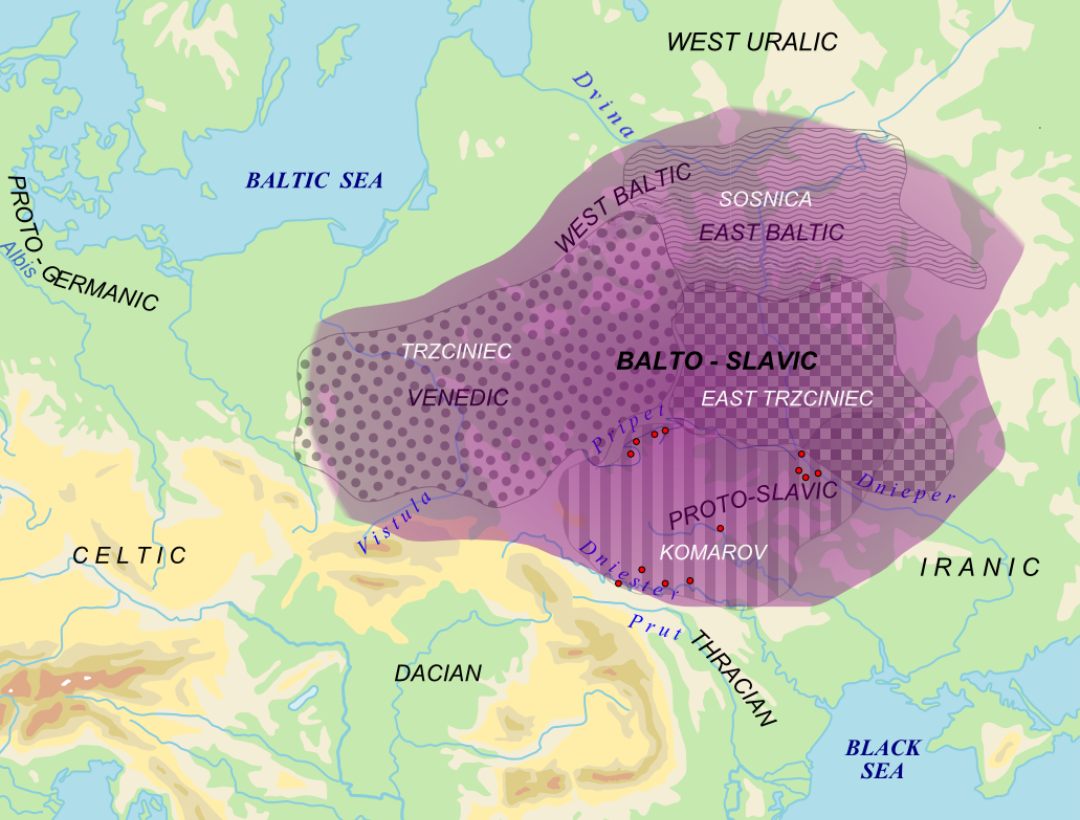
Area of Balto-Slavic dialectic continuum (purple) with proposed Bronze Age material cultures in white. Red dots indicate archaic Slavic hydronyms.

In the Bohemian chronicles, Čech appears on his own or only with Lech. Čech is first mentioned in Latin as Bohemus in the Cosmas' chronicle of 1125. The earliest Polish mention of Lech, Čech, and Rus is found in the Chronicle of Greater Poland written at the end of the 13th or the beginning of the 14th century.

The legend suggests a common ancestry of the Poles, Czechs and the Ruthenians (Rus), and illustrates the fact that as early as the 13th century, at least three different Slavic peoples were aware of being ethnically and linguistically interrelated. The legends also agree on the location of the homeland of the Early Slavic peoples in Eastern Europe. This area overlapped the region presumed by mainstream scholarship to be the Proto-Indo-European homeland in the general region of the Pontic–Caspian steppe. In the framework of the Kurgan hypothesis, "the Indo-Europeans who remained after the migrations became speakers of Balto-Slavic".

The most well-known version of the legend is seen to be somewhat Polonocentric, as it mentions a national symbol (the white eagle) only for Lech and the Polish nation, while relegating the two other brothers, Czech and Rus, to secondary characters. Furthermore, this particular version does not address the origin of the South Slavic peoples.

The legend also attempts to explain the etymology of the ethnonyms: Lechia (another name for Poland including Silesia), the Czech lands (including Bohemia, Moravia, and also Silesia), and Rus. Jan Kochanowski, a prominent Renaissance Polish man of letters, in his essay on the origin of the Slavs, makes no mention of the third "brother", Rus. Moreover, he dismisses the legend entirely, stating that "no historian who has taken up the subject of the Slavic nation [...] mentions any of those two Slavic leaders, Lech and Czech". He goes on to assume that "Czechy" and "Lechy" are quite probably the original names for the two nations, although he does not dismiss the possibility that there might have been a great leader by the name Lech whose name replaced the original and later forgotten name for the Polish nation.

== Legacy ==
=== Oaks of Rogalin ===
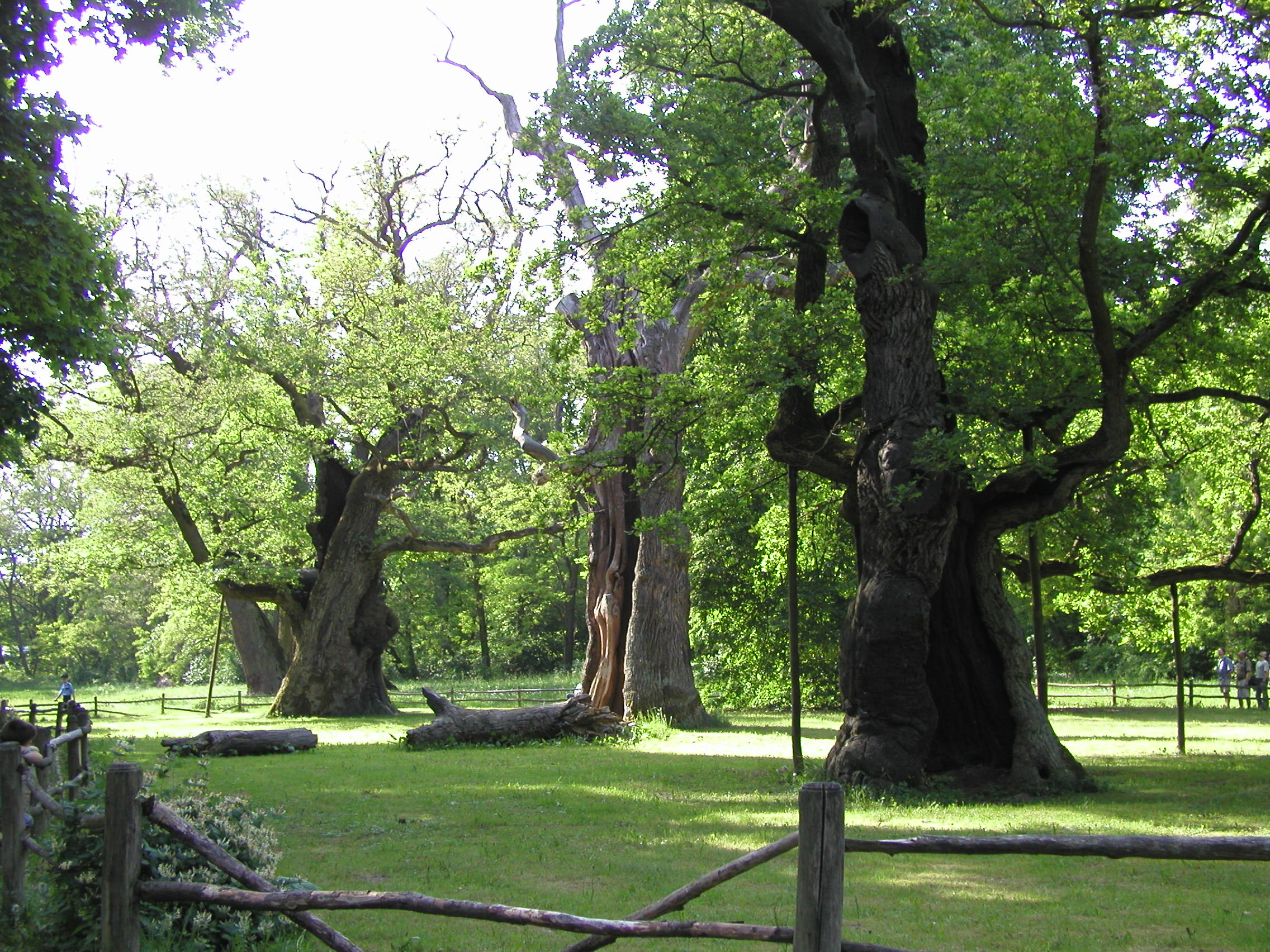
Lech, Czech, and Rus oaks in Rogalin, Poland

Three large oaks in the garden adjacent to the 18th-century palace in Rogalin, Greater Poland, are named after the brothers (Lech, Czech i Rus), and are several hundred years old. They vary between 670 and 930 centimetres (22 and 31 ft) in circumference. Rus is the oldest oak tree in Poland, about 800 years old.They are part of the Rogalin Landscape Park, and together with others they have been declared nature monuments and placed under protection.

== See also ==
- Kyi, Shchek and Khoryv, three brothers who are the legendary founders of Kyiv
- Jonakr's sons
- Romulus and Remus, two brothers in the founding myth of Rome
- List of national founders
