= Ctiněves =

- Municipality
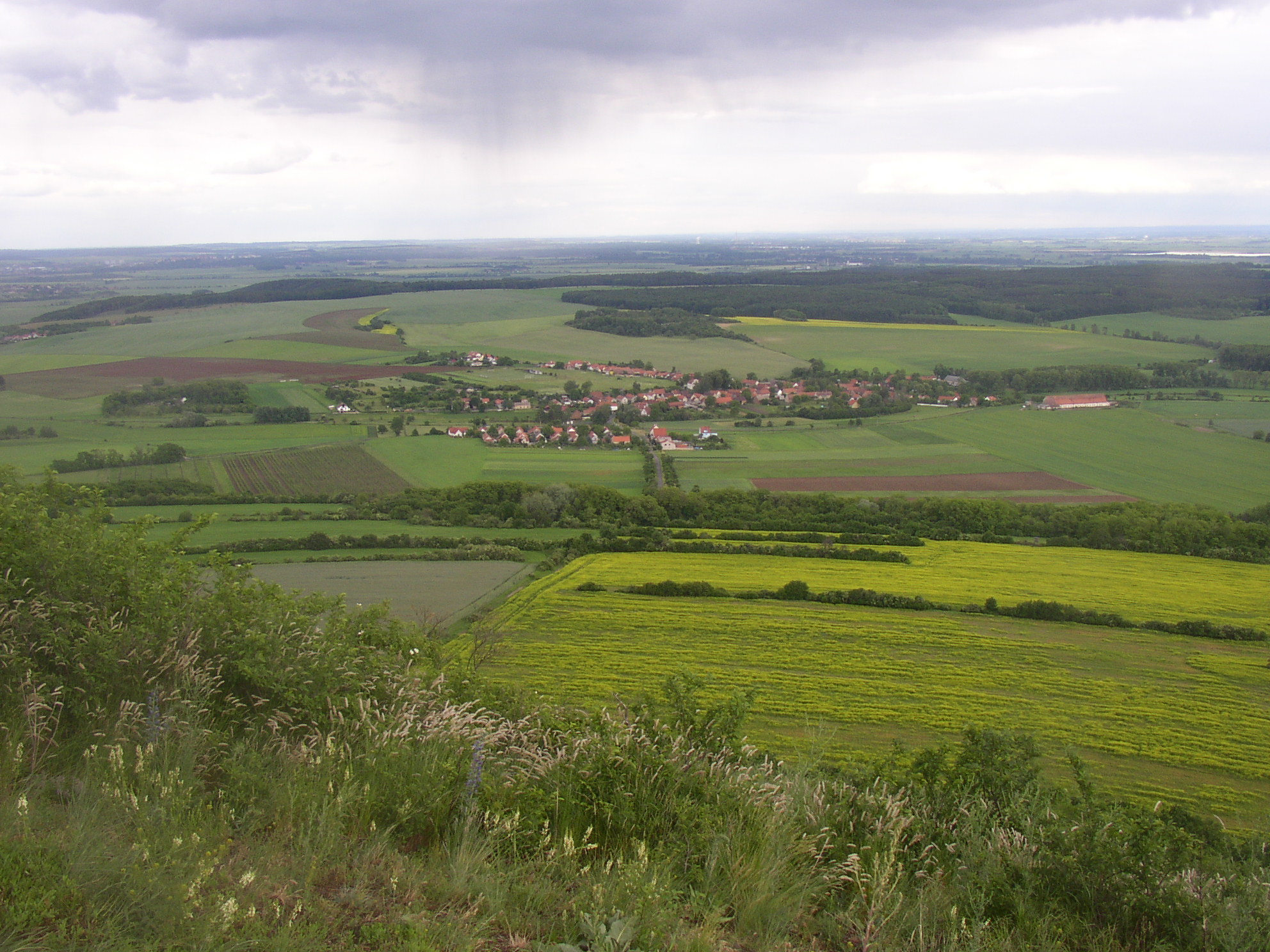
- View from the northwest

- Flag Coat of arms

- Location in the Czech Republic
- Coordinates: 50°22′29″N 14°18′26″E
- Country: Czech Republic
- Region: Ústí nad Labem
- District: Litoměřice
- First mentioned: 1318

Area
  - Total: 5.48 km^{2} (2.12 sq mi)
- Elevation: 240 m (790 ft)

Population (2026-01-01)
  - Total: 398
  - Density: 72.6/km^{2} (188/sq mi)
- Time zone: UTC+1 (CET)
  - Summer (DST): UTC+2 (CEST)
- Postal code: 413 01
- Website: www.obec-ctineves.cz

Ctiněves is a municipality and village in Litoměřice District in the Ústí nad Labem Region of the Czech Republic. It has about 400 inhabitants.

Ctiněves lies approximately 22 kilometres (14 mi) south-east of Litoměřice, 37 km (23 mi) south-east of Ústí nad Labem, and 34 km (21 mi) north of Prague.

== Demographics ==
Historical population
Year	Pop.	±%
1869	441	—
1880	431	−2.3%
1890	458	+6.3%
1900	461	+0.7%
1910	553	+20.0%
1921	560	+1.3%
1930	557	−0.5%
1950	503	−9.7%
1961	464	−7.8%
1970	395	−14.9%
1980	318	−19.5%
1991	248	−22.0%
2001	258	+4.0%
2011	315	+22.1%
2021	353	+12.1%
Source: Censuses
