= Říp =

Hill in the Czech Republic; central to Czech mythology

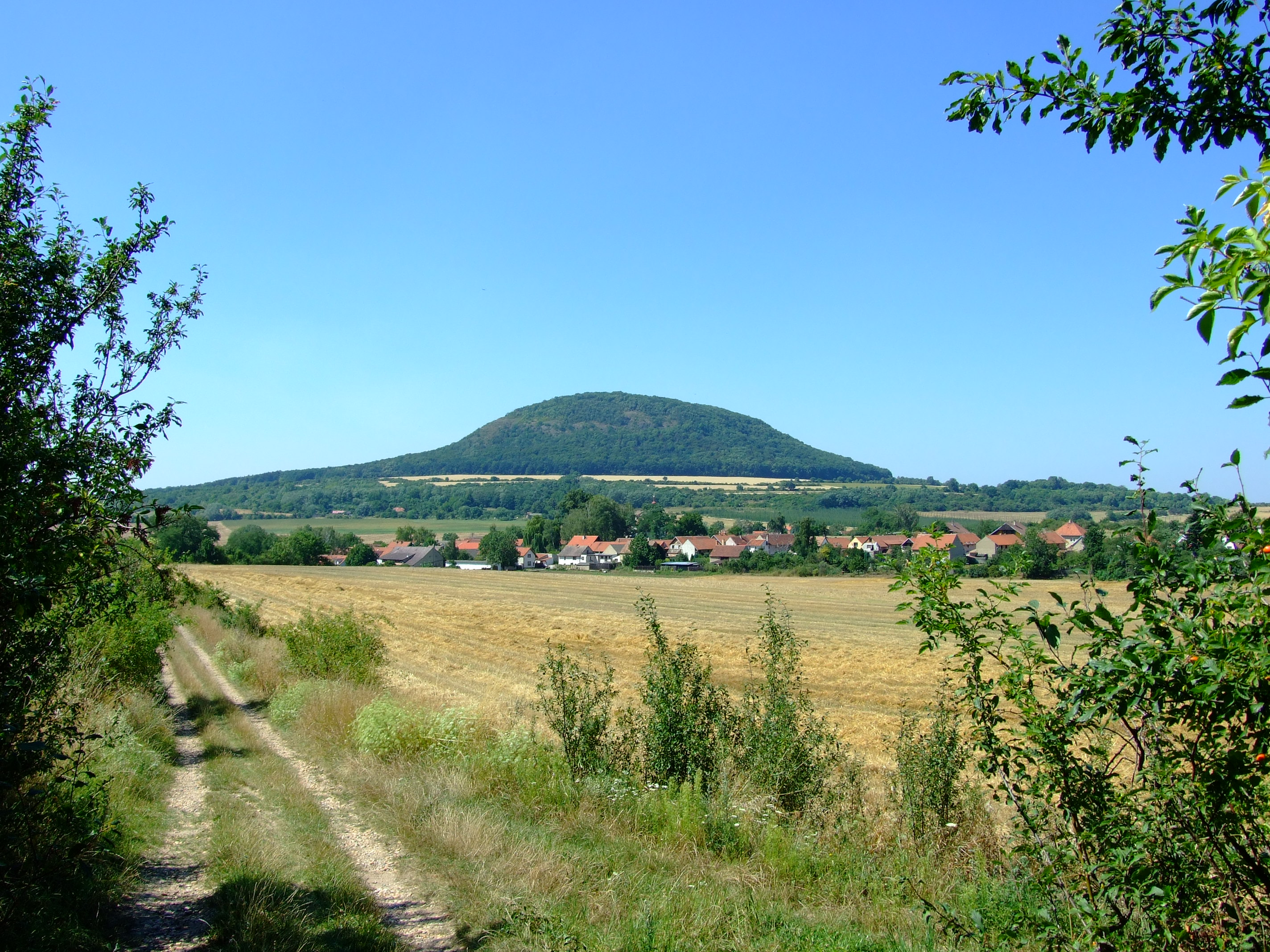
- Říp from the south

Highest point
- Elevation: 461 m (1,512 ft)
- Prominence: 200 m (660 ft)
- Isolation: 21.5 km (13.4 mi)
- Coordinates: 50°23′11″N 14°17′18″E

Geography
- Location within Czech Republic
- Location: Czech Republic
- Parent range: Lower Ohře Table

Říp (IPA: [ˈɦora ˈr̝iːp]; German: [Sankt] Georgsberg) is a 461 metres (1,512 ft) high solitary hill in the Lower Ohře Table in the Czech Republic. It is located 20 km (12 mi) southeast of Litoměřice. According to national legend, it is the place where the first Czechs settled. The mountain and the rotunda on its top are protected as a national cultural monument.

Říp, being visible from great distance, has always been an important orientation point in the Bohemian scenery and has attracted attention since the oldest times.

== Geomorphology ==
In terms of geomorphological division, Říp is located in a flatland of the Lower Ohře Table within the Central Bohemian Table macroregion, and is the highest peak of this entire macroregion.

== Geology ==
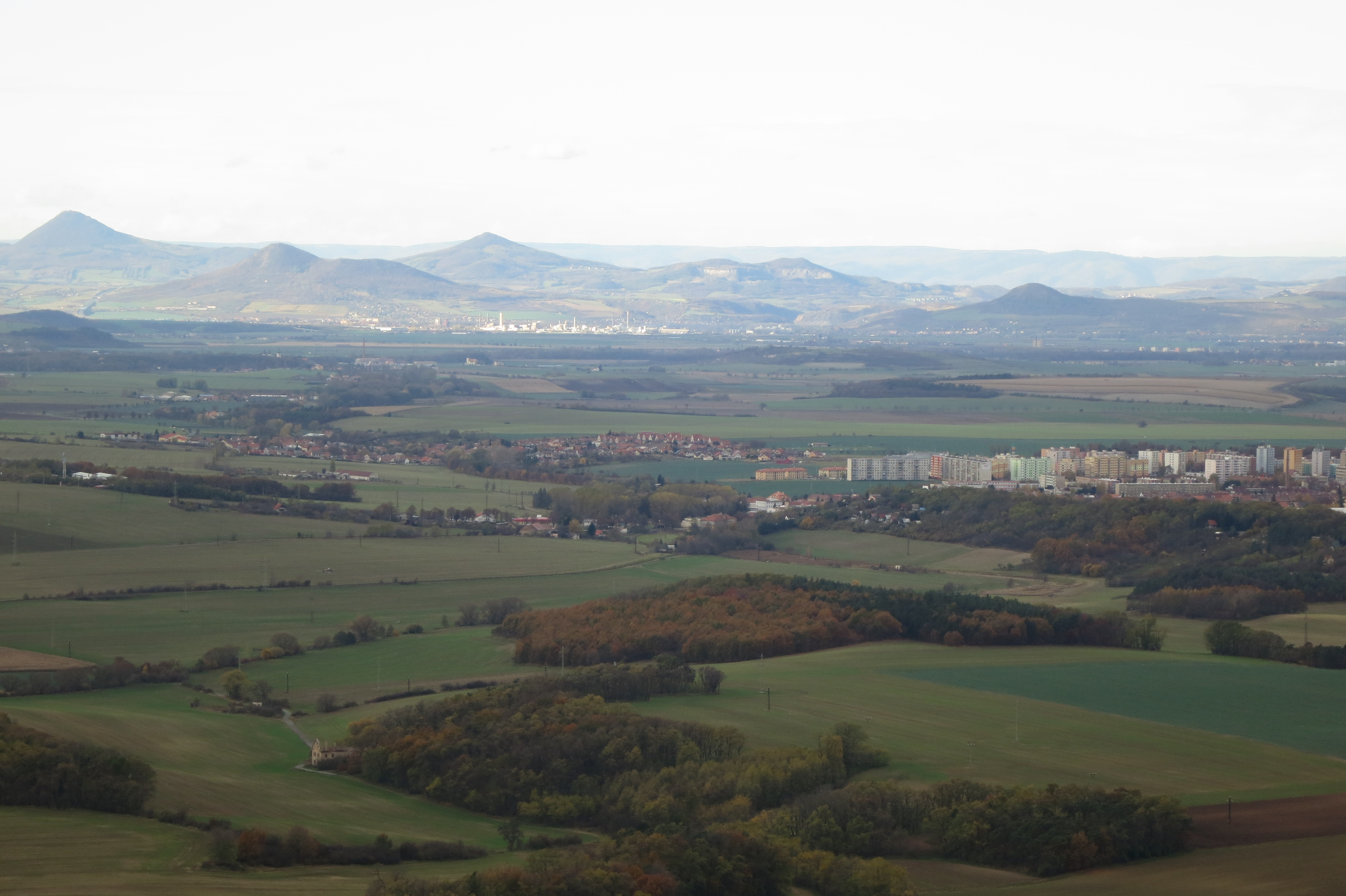
View from Říp

Geologically, Říp is the erosional remnant of a late Oligocene volcano and is composed of basalt nephelites containing olivine granules, amphibole, leucite and – among others – magnetite, so a local magnetic anomaly can even be observed there by the compass.

== Nature ==
The hill was bare until 1879 when Mořic Lobkowicz had it planted with trees. Today, almost all of the mountain is covered by an oak-and-hornbeam forest with some maple, pine, ash, and linden trees. Some rare thermophile plants can be found at the few tree-less places on the top of the hill, such as Gagea bohemica and Iris pumila.

== Name ==
The name of the mountain is of pre-Slavic origin and probably comes from the Old-Germanic stem ríp- (elevation, hill), which has the Latin parallel in the word rípa (shore, slope, hillside). Some linguists also derive the origin of the name from the Illyrian-Thracian base.

== Legend ==
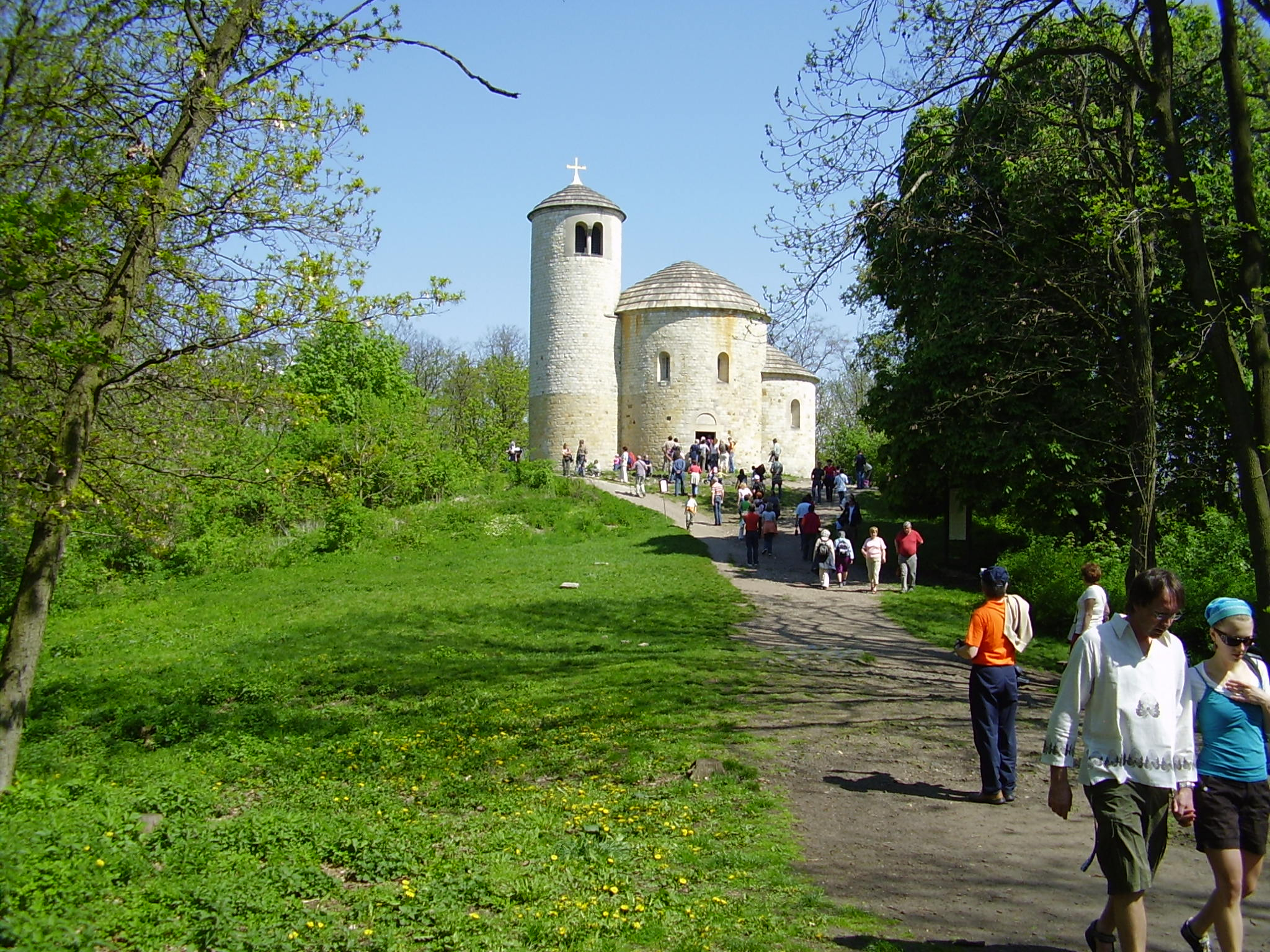
The rotunda of Saint George on top of the hill

According to a traditional legend, first recorded by the ancient Czech chronicler Cosmas of Prague in the early 12th century, Říp was the place where the first Slavs, led by Forefather Čech, settled. According to the Chronicle of Dalimil from 1310, when Čech and his people climbed Říp, he looked upon the landscape and told his brothers that they have reached the promised land: "We have a country at our will, here will be our tables always full, enough of wild animals, birds, fish, bees and hardness against enemies."

The land was named after the leader. In the 16th century, the legend was revived by Václav Hájek of Libočany who claimed that Čech was buried in the nearby village of Ctiněves and, later on, by Alois Jirásek in his Old Bohemian Legends from 1894.

== Buildings ==
On top of the hill there is a Romanesque rotunda of Saint George, which is one of the oldest buildings in the Czech Republic. This is mentioned for the first time in 1126, when Soběslav I, Duke of Bohemia, commemorating his victory at the Battle of Chlumec, where he defeated Holy Roman Emperor Lothair III, had the rotunda repaired and extended by the western circular tower. The rotunda's current appearance is the result of a purist reconstruction during the 1870s.

Inside the rotunda is a stone sculpture by contemporary Czech artist Stanislav Hanzík "The Good Shepherd" from 1979, symbolising the arrival of Czech ancestors to the country and the beginning of Czech history there.

Near the rotunda is a tourist hut that was built in 1907 and still serves travellers today. In accordance with the patriotic spirit of that era, a wooden plate is mounted on the hut wall that says: "Co Mohamedu Mekka, to Čechu Říp" ('what Mecca is to a Muslim, Říp is to a Czech').

== Points of interest ==
The top of Říp became a popular pilgrimage place and a frequent site of national manifestations and mass meetings. A famous manifestation was held there on 10 May 1868 when the foundation stone was taken from the hill for the newly built National Theatre in Prague. Tradition has it that each Czech should climb this mountain at least once in his life.
