= Vraňany =

- Municipality
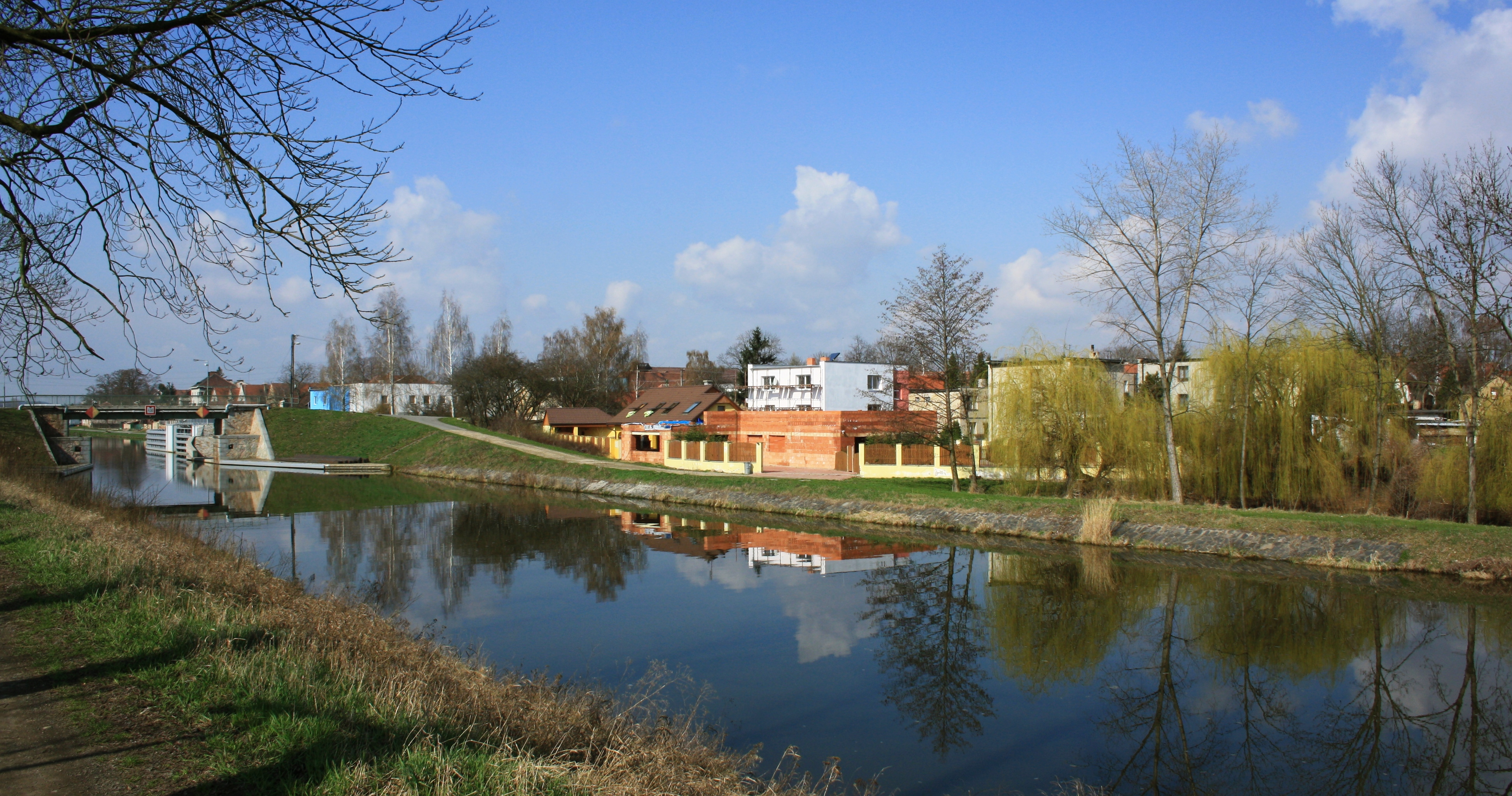
- Lateral canal of the Vltava

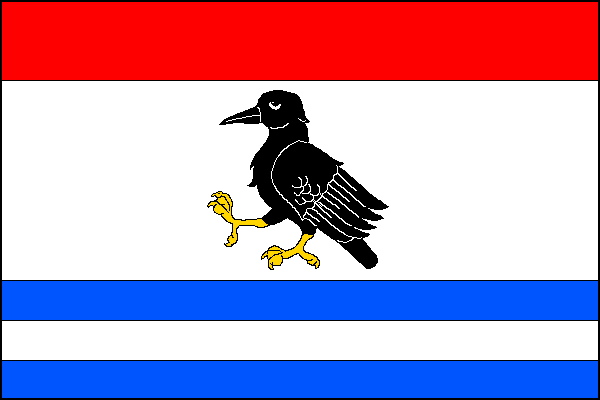
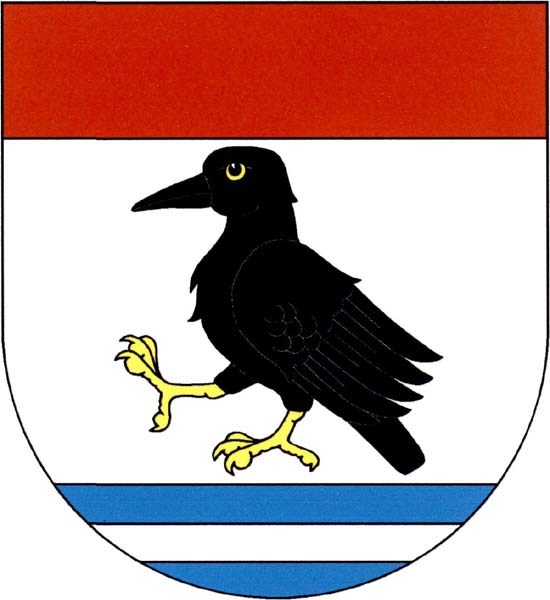
- Flag Coat of arms

- Location in the Czech Republic
- Coordinates: 50°19′2″N 14°21′42″E
- Country: Czech Republic
- Region: Central Bohemian
- District: Mělník
- First mentioned: 1227

Area
  - Total: 9.70 km^{2} (3.75 sq mi)
- Elevation: 192 m (630 ft)

Population (2026-01-01)
  - Total: 973
  - Density: 100/km^{2} (260/sq mi)
- Time zone: UTC+1 (CET)
  - Summer (DST): UTC+2 (CEST)
- Postal code: 277 07
- Website: www.vranany.cz

Vraňany is a municipality and village in Mělník District in the Central Bohemian Region of the Czech Republic. It has about 1,000 inhabitants.

== Administrative division ==
Vraňany consists of two municipal parts (in brackets population according to the 2021 census):

- Vraňany (670)
- Mlčechvosty (252)

== Demographics ==
Historical population
Year	Pop.	±%
1869	753	—
1880	849	+12.7%
1890	924	+8.8%
1900	895	−3.1%
1910	905	+1.1%
1921	984	+8.7%
1930	1,139	+15.8%
1950	1,001	−12.1%
1961	1,095	+9.4%
1970	1,014	−7.4%
1980	864	−14.8%
1991	769	−11.0%
2001	843	+9.6%
2011	853	+1.2%
2021	922	+8.1%
Source: Censuses
