= Lower Ohře Table =

Plateau in the Czech Republic

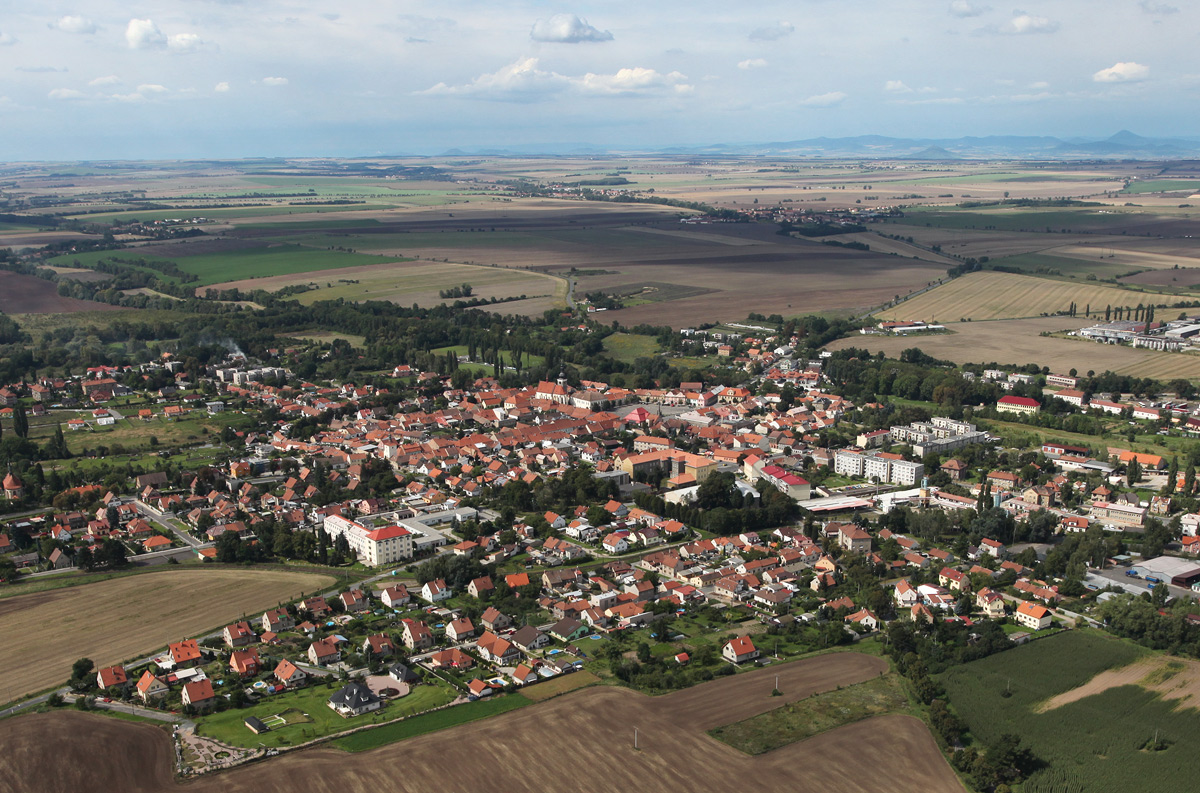
- Aerial view of Velvary

Highest point
- Peak: Říp
- Elevation: 461 m (1,512 ft)

Dimensions
- Length: 60 km (37 mi)
- Area: 1,139 km^{2} (440 mi^{2})

Geography
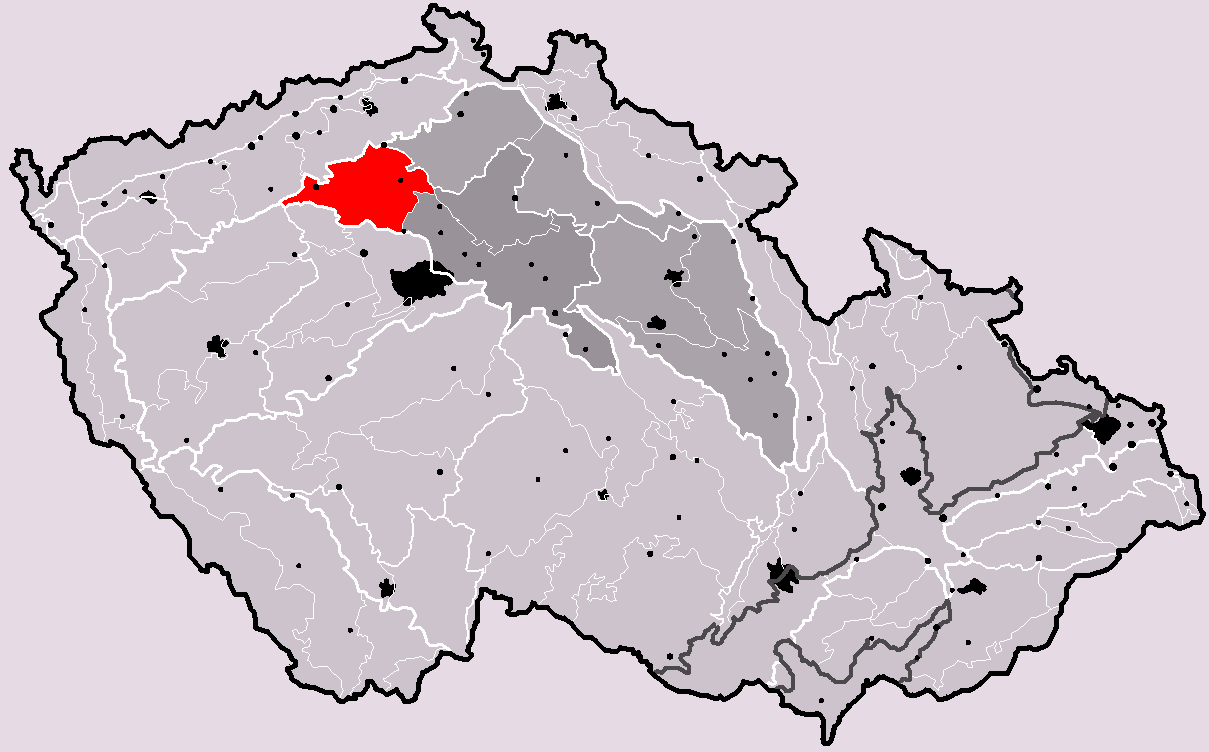
- Lower Ohře Table in the geomorphological system of the Czech Republic
- Country: Czech Republic
- Regions: Ústí nad Labem, Central Bohemian
- Range coordinates: 50°23′N 14°6′E
- Parent range: Central Bohemian Table

Geology
- Rock type(s): Marl, siltstone, sandstone

The Lower Ohře Table (Czech: Dolnooharská tabule) is a plateau and a geomorphological mesoregion of the Czech Republic. It is located in the Ústí nad Labem and Central Bohemian regions.

== Geomorphology ==
The Lower Ohře Table is a mesoregion of the Central Bohemian Table within the Bohemian Massif. Typical features of the landscape are relatively intact relief with significant manifestations of neotectonics (in the southeastern and southern part of the table) and relief of Pleistocene river terraces and wide valley floodplains (in the north and east), and tectonic and denudation depressions. The plateau is further subdivided into the microregions of Hazmburk Table, Říp Table and Terezín Valley.

Two prominent hills of neovolcanic origin rise from the flat relief, otherwise there are no significant peaks. The highest peaks of the Lower Ohře Table are:

- Říp, 461 m (1,512 ft)
- Hazmburk, 429 m (1,407 ft)
- V Březinách, 388 m (1,273 ft)
- Veselá, 372 m (1,220 ft)
- Draha, 355 m (1,165 ft)

== Geography ==
The territory has a relatively compact shape, slightly elongated from west to east. The plateau has an area of 1,139 square kilometres (440 sq mi) and an average elevation of 229 metres (751 ft). Most of the Lower Ohře Table is located in the Ústí nad Labem Region, only a smaller part in the south extends into the Central Bohemian Region. The northeastern part of the territory overlaps with the informally defined region of Polabí.

The largest river in the Lower Ohře Table is the Elbe, which flows through its eastern part. The axis of the table is the Ohře, after which the region is named.

Suitable natural conditions contributed to the creation of many towns in the Lower Ohře Table, but there are no large cities. The most populated towns in the territory are Louny, Roudnice nad Labem, Lovosice, Štětí and Libochovice. A part of Kralupy nad Vltavou also extends into the Lower Ohře Table.

== Vegetation ==
The landscape is predominantly agricultural and sparsely forested.

== Gallery ==
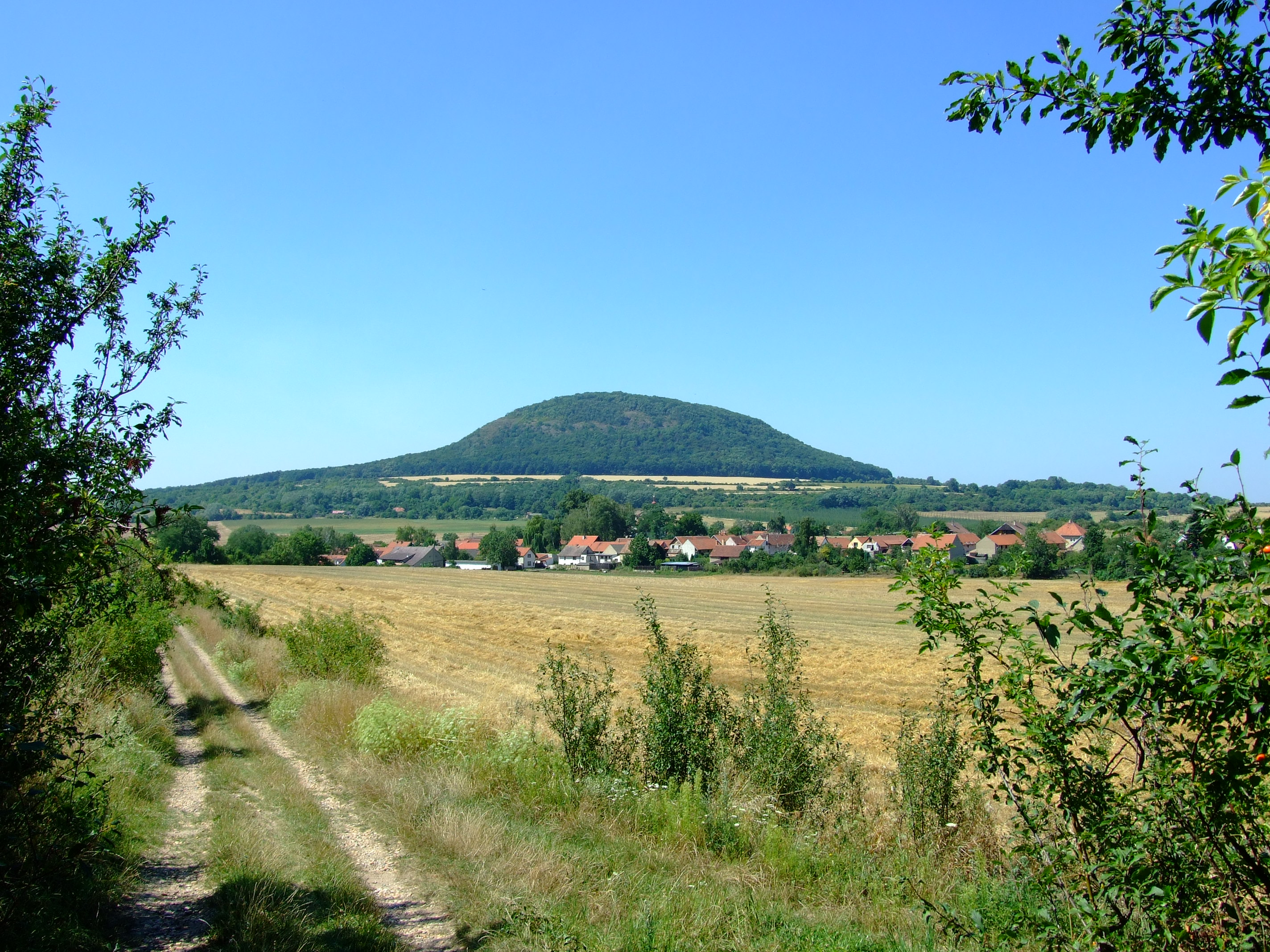
View towards Říp

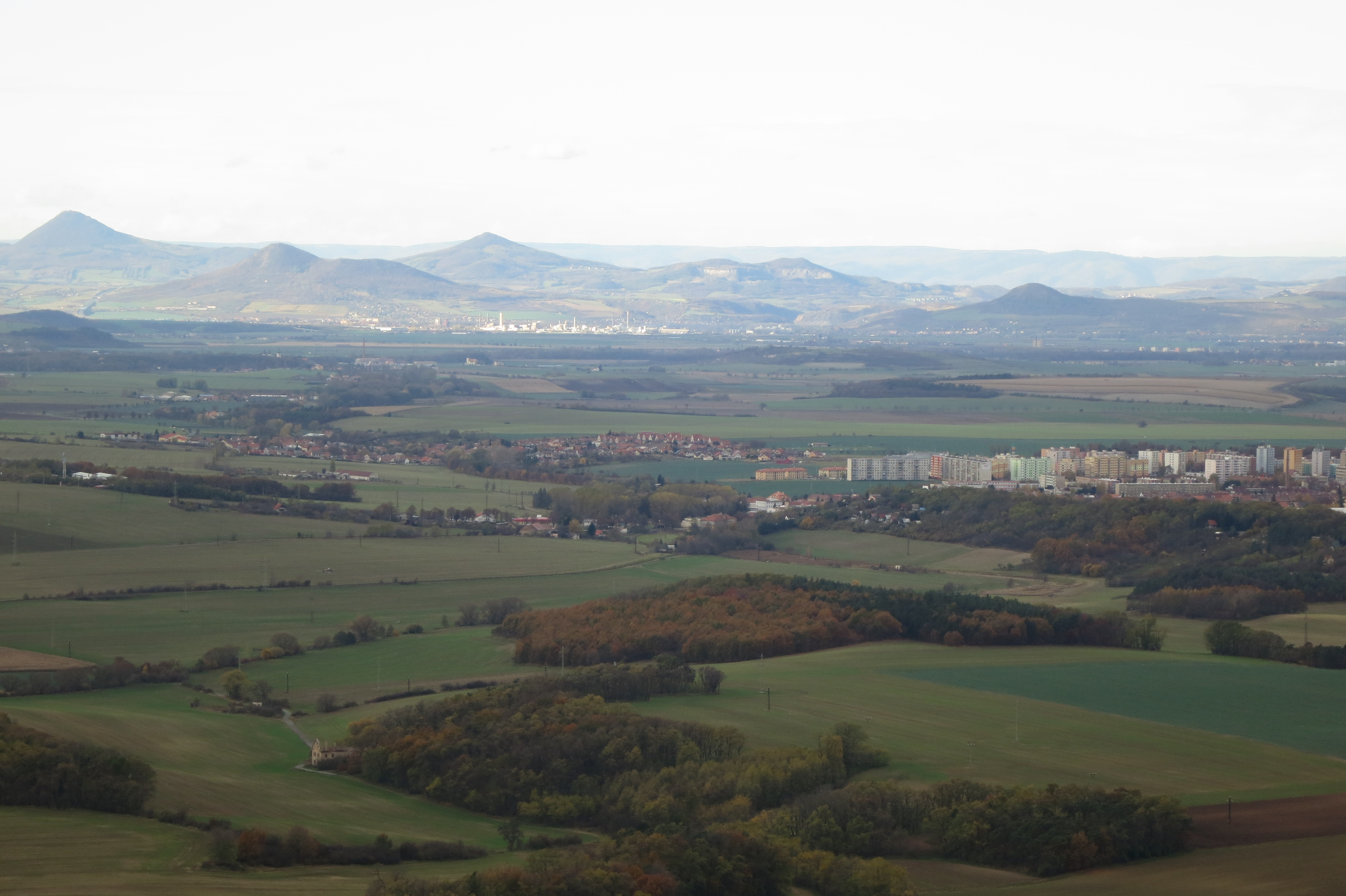
View from Říp to the north; Central Bohemian Uplands in the background

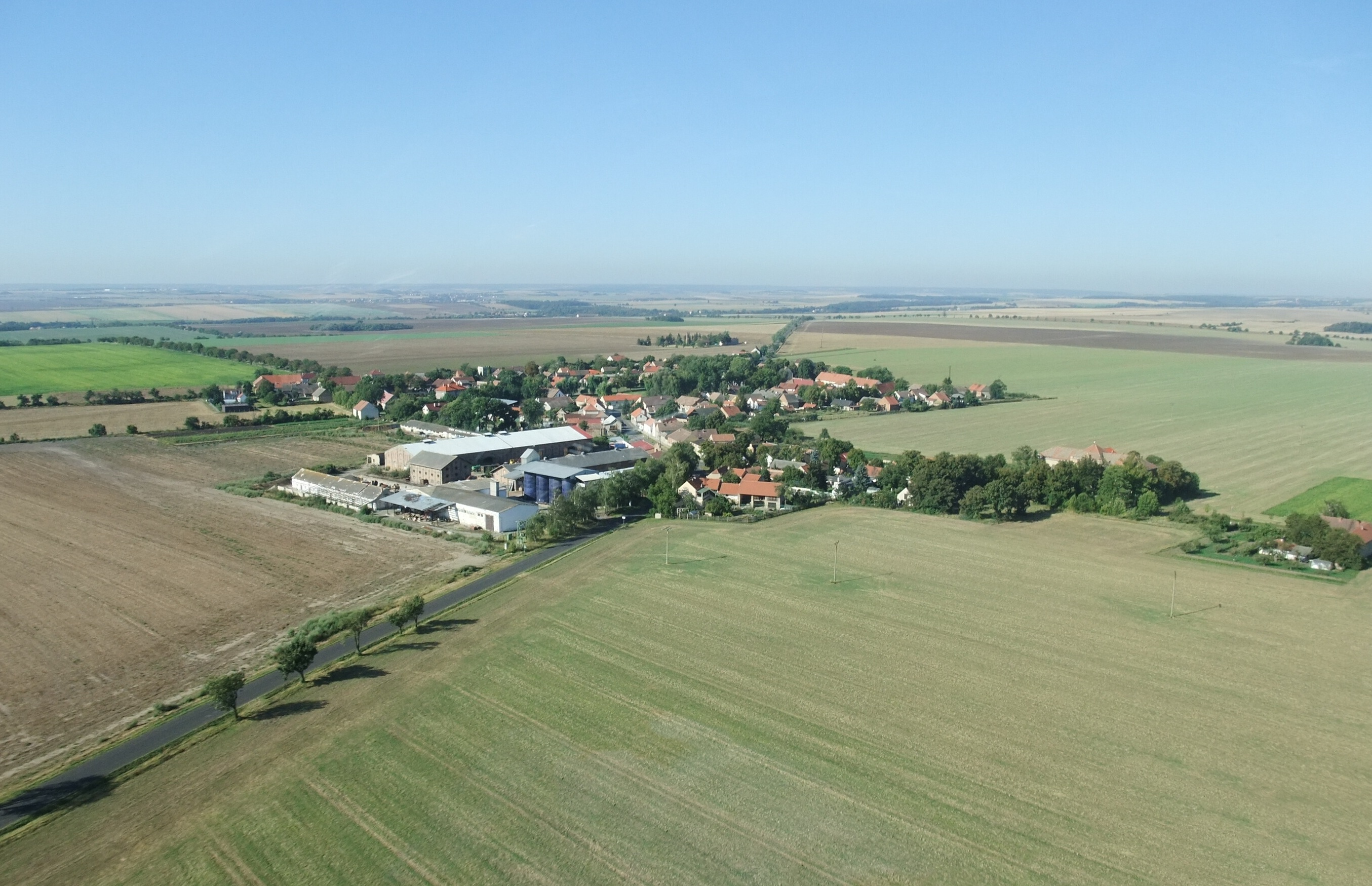
The village of Radešín in the centre of the Lower Ohře Table

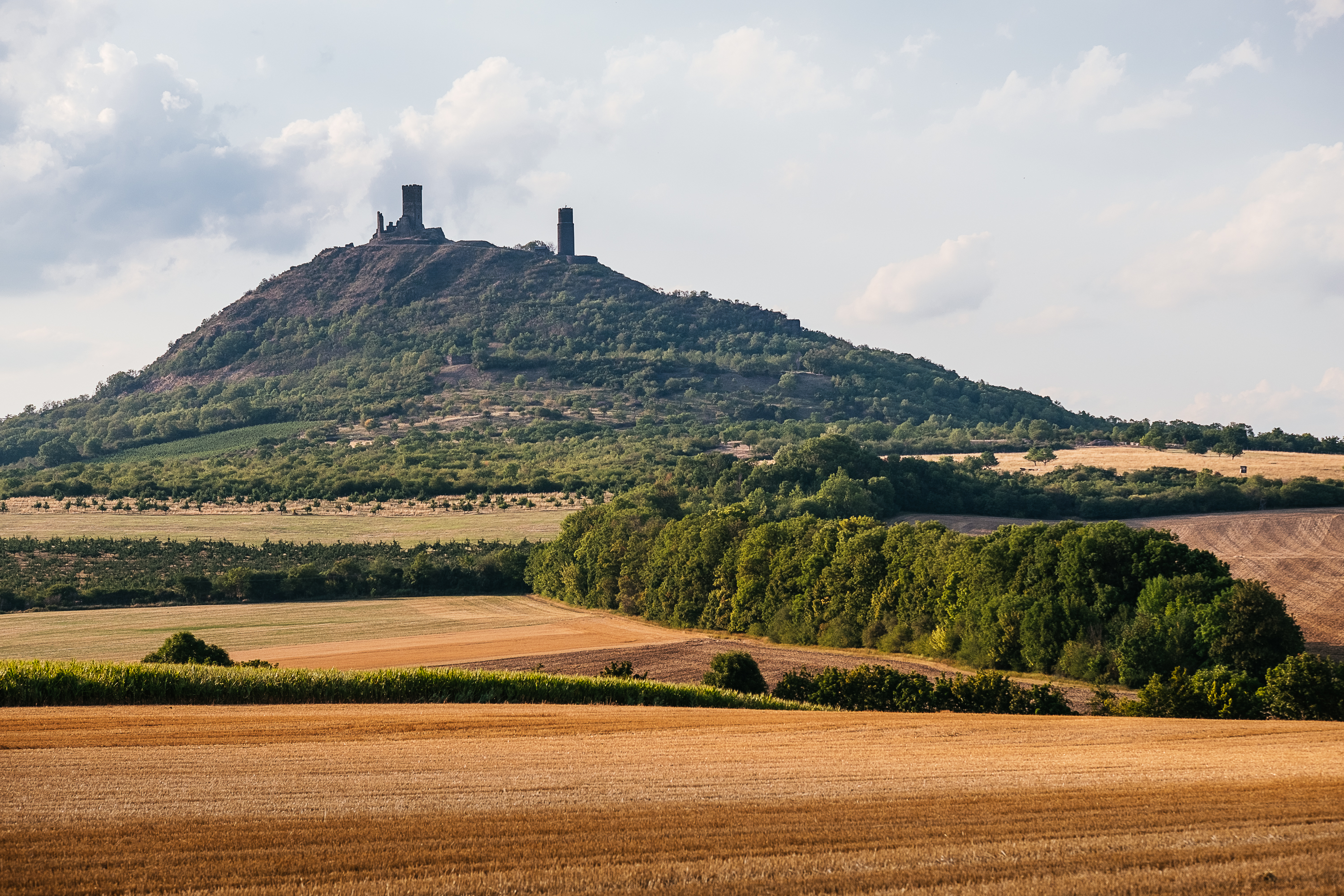
Hazmburk, the second highest hill of the Lower Ohře Table
