= Maltese cross =

Heraldic cross

Cross of the Order of Saint John

Cross of the Order of Saint Lazarus

The Maltese cross (also the Amalfi cross) is a cross symbol, consisting of four "V" or arrowhead shaped concave quadrilaterals converging at a central vertex at right angles, two tips pointing outward symmetrically.

It is a heraldic cross variant which developed from earlier forms of eight-pointed crosses in the 16th century. Although chiefly associated with the Knights Hospitaller (Order of St. John, now the Sovereign Military Order of Malta), and by extension with the island of Malta, it has come to be used by a wide array of entities since the early modern period, notably the Order of Saint Stephen, the city of Amalfi, the Polish Order of the White Eagle (1709), the Prussian order Pour le Mérite (1740), and the Bavarian Military Merit Order (1866).

Unicode defines a character named "Maltese cross" in the Dingbats range at code point U+2720 (✠); however, most computer fonts render the code point as a cross pattée.

== History ==
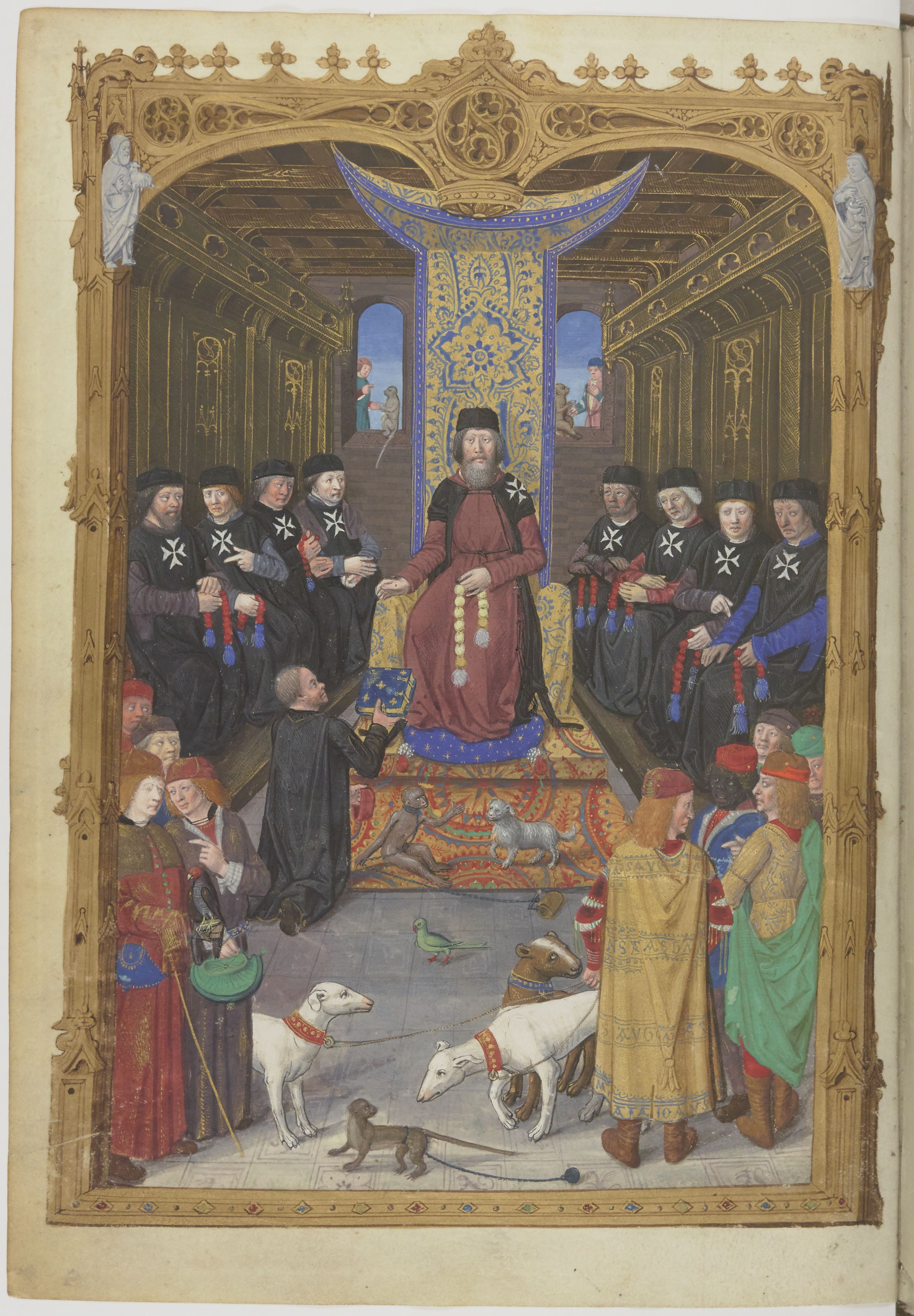
Grand Master Pierre d'Aubusson with senior knights, wearing the "Rhodian cross" on their habits. Dedicatory miniature in Gestorum Rhodie obsidionis commentarii (account of the Siege of Rhodes of 1480), BNF Lat 6067 fol. 3v, dated 1483/4.

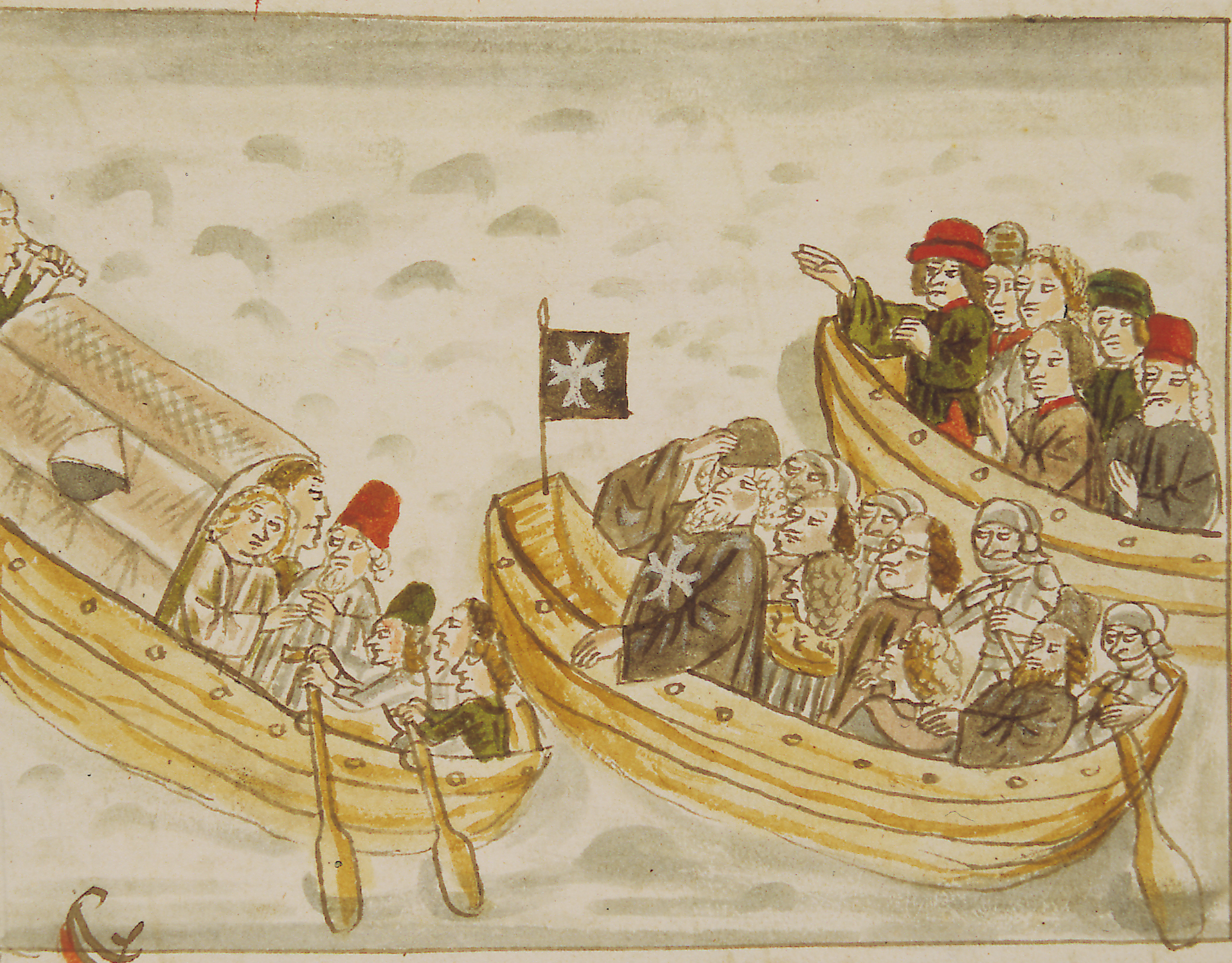
Johann Loesel, grand prior of the langue of Germany, shown with the eight-pointed cross on a flag and his habit in his role as mediator in the Old Zürich War in February 1446 (illustration of Gerold Edlibach's chronicle, c. 1500)

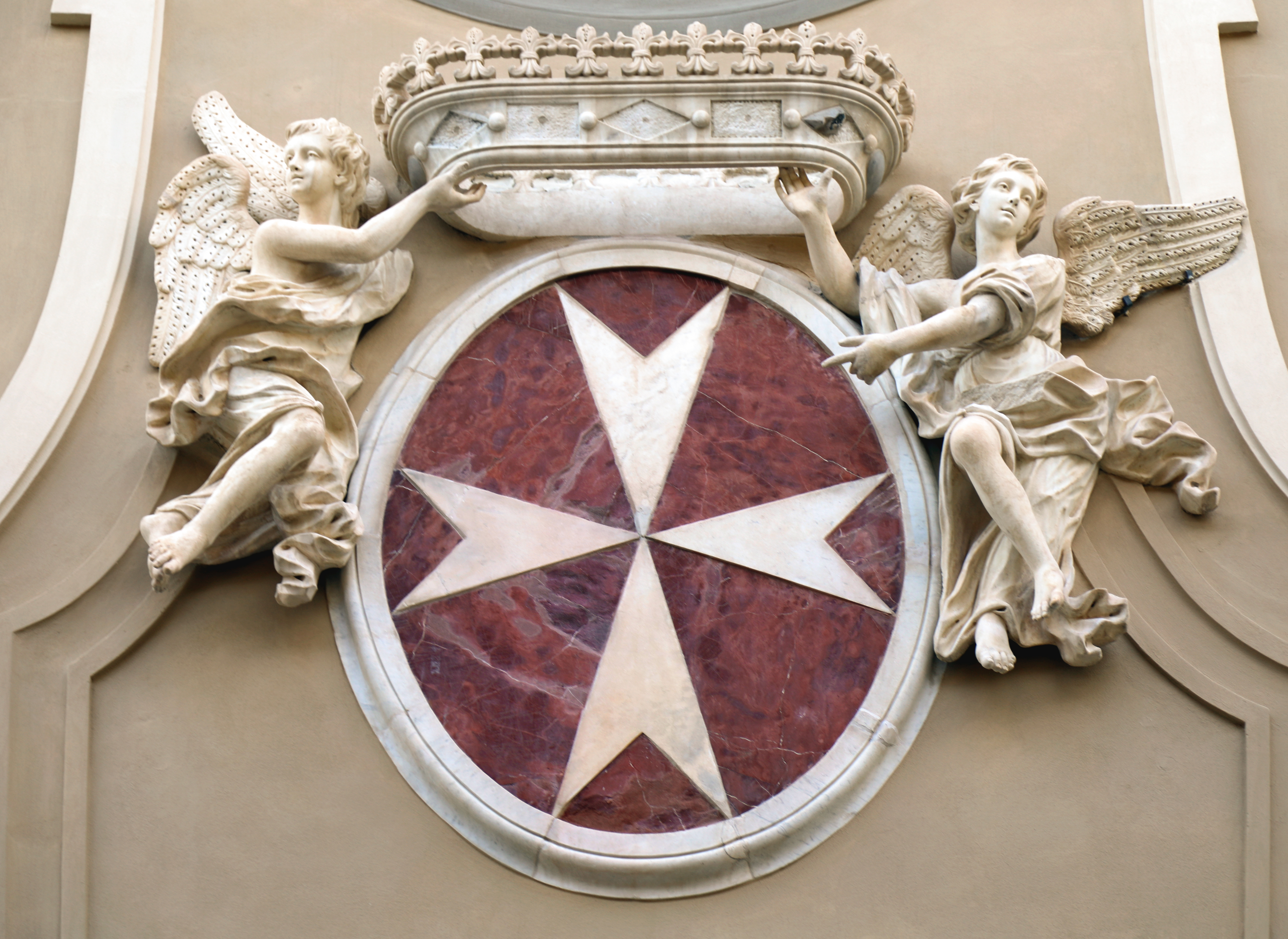
Emblem of the Military Order of Malta on the façade of San Giovannino dei Cavalieri, Florence (1699).

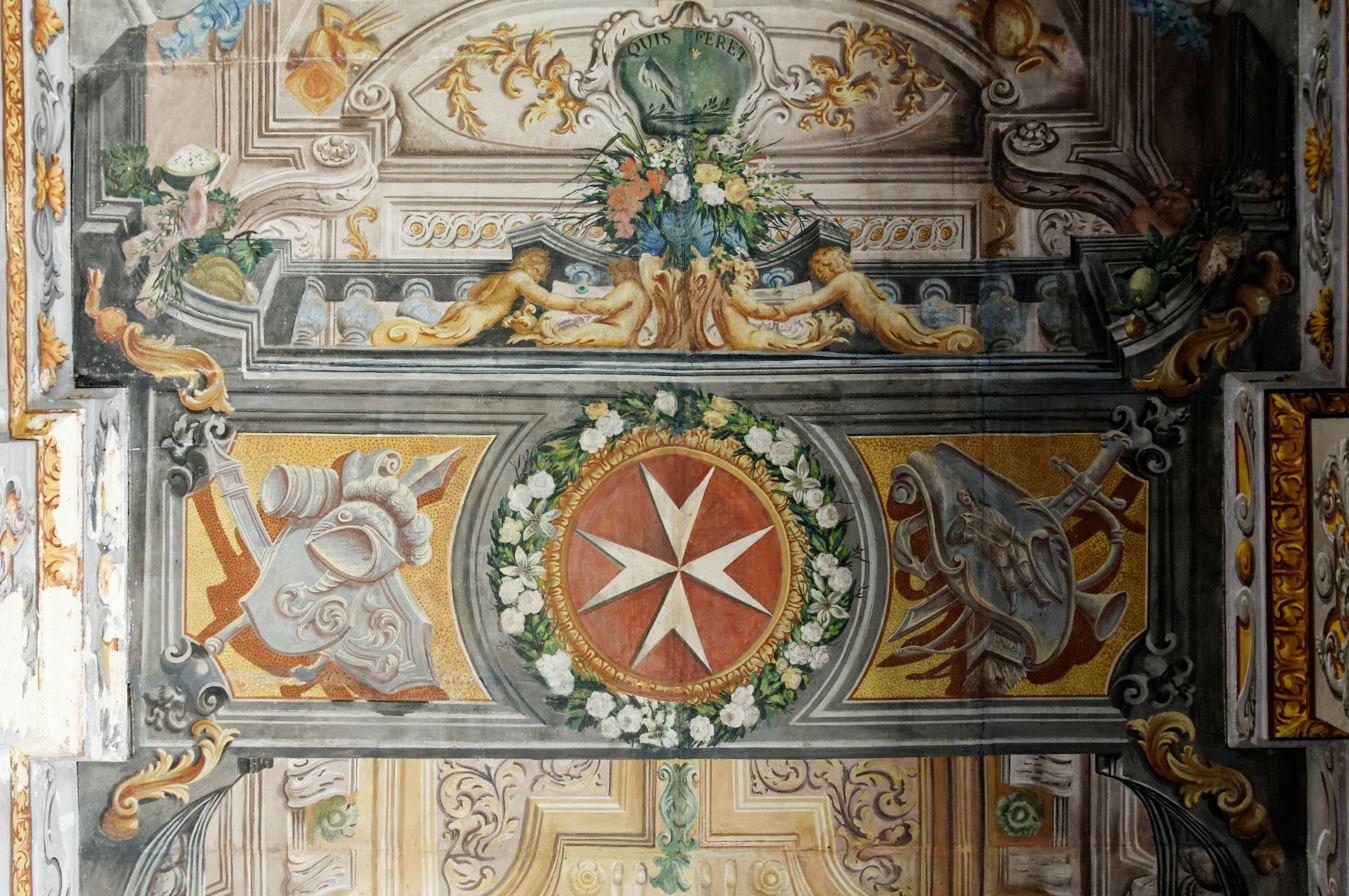
Fresco on the ceiling of the main corridor in the Grandmaster's Palace in Valletta (Nicolau Nasoni 1724)

The Knights Hospitaller during the Crusades used a plain Latin cross. Occasional use of the modern form straight-edged "eight-pointed cross" by the order begins in the early 16th century. This early form is a cross moline (ancrée) or cross branchée ending in eight points, not yet featuring the sharp vertex of the modern design. The association of the eight-pointed cross with the southern Italy coastal town of Amalfi may go back to the 11th century, as the design is allegedly found on coins minted by the Duchy of Amalfi at that time.

Eight-pointed crosses appear on coins minted by the Grand Masters of the order, first shown as a bolsini-type cross embroidered on the left arm of the robe of the kneeling Grand Master on the obverse of a coin minted under Foulques de Villaret (r. 1305–1319) In 1489, the statutes of the order require all knights of Malta to wear "the white cross with eight points".

Emergence of the sharp vertex of the modern "four-arrowhead" design is gradual, and takes place during the 15th to 16th century. The "Rhodian cross" of the early 16th century had almost, but not quite, achieved the "sharp arrowhead appearance". The fully modern design is found on a copper coin dated 1567, minted by Grand Master Jean Parisot de Valette (r. 1557–1568). In 1577, Alonso Sanchez Coello painted Archduke Wenceslaus of Austria as Grand Prior of the Order of Malta wearing the emblem on his robes.

The design appears again on coins minted in the late 17th to 18th centuries. It is shown on a copper coin dated 1693, minted under Grand Master Adrien de Wignacourt. From the end of the 17th century, it is also occasionally displayed as alternative heraldic emblem of the order. Its depiction on the facade of San Giovannino dei Cavalieri dates to 1699.

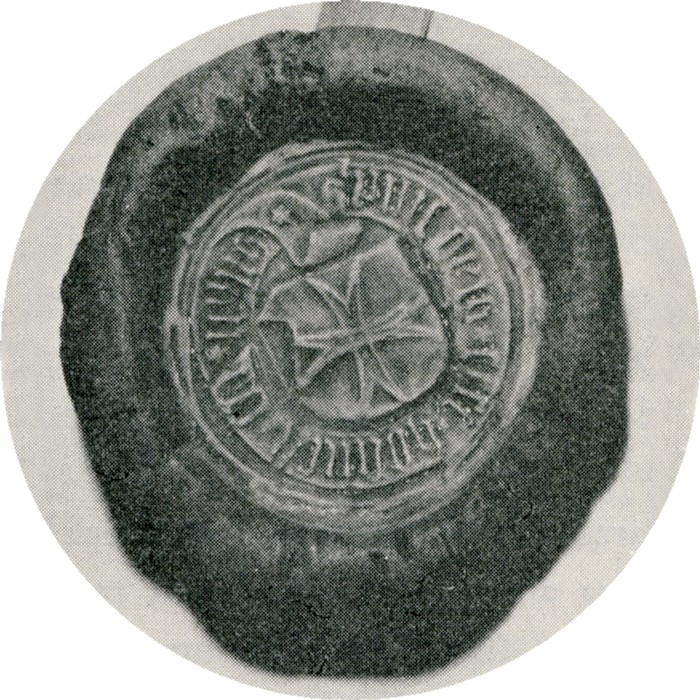
Early form of the eight-pointed cross (cross fourchée), seal of the provost of St John's church, Stockholm, dated 1526.

Insignia of the Knights Hospitaller

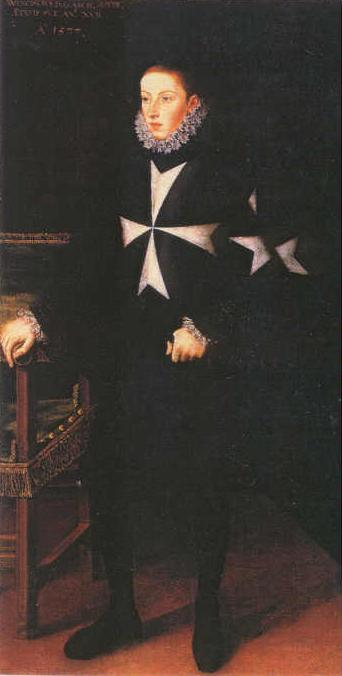
Portrait of Archduke Wenceslaus of Austria wearing the habit of the Order of Malta (Alonso Sánchez Coello, 1577)

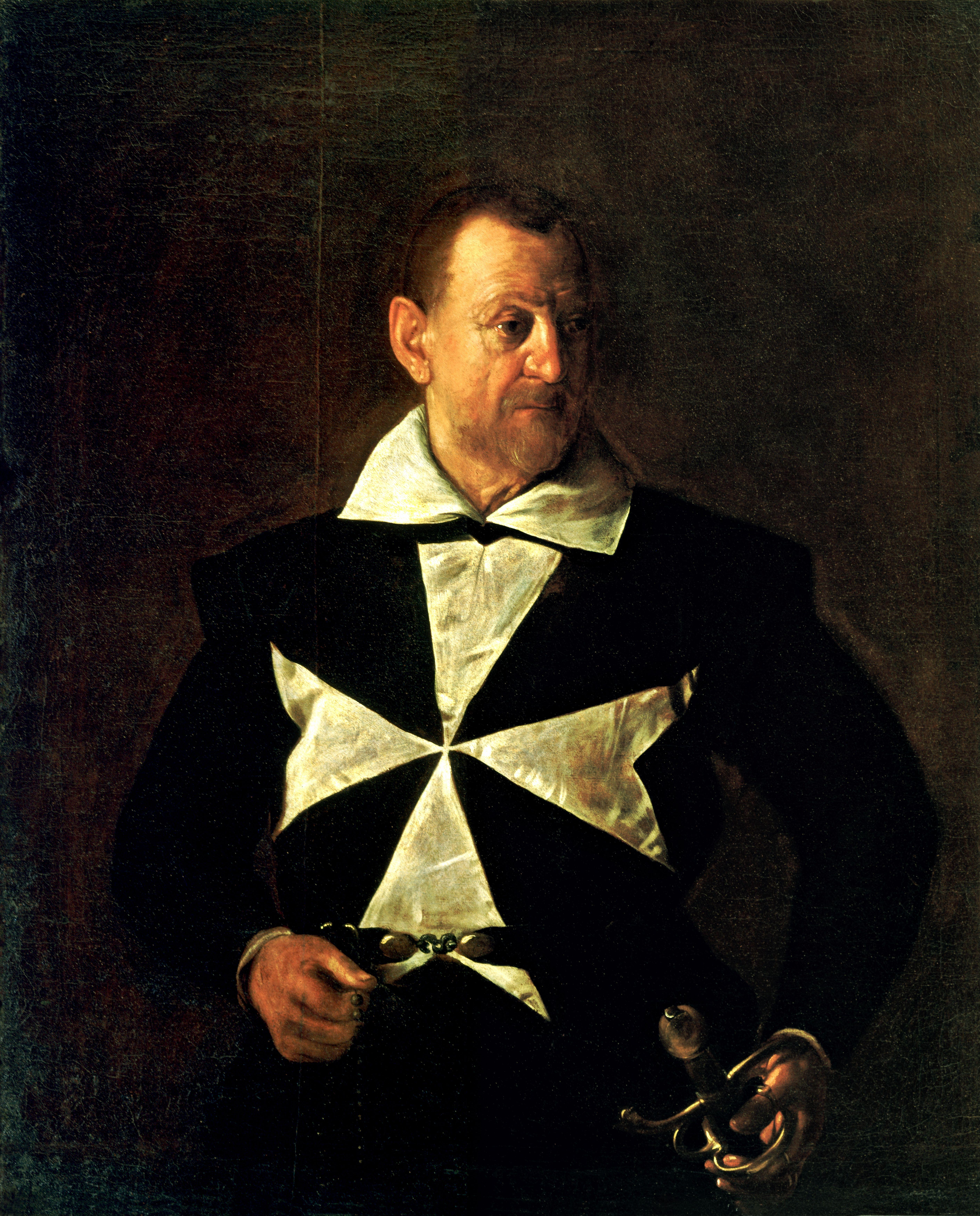
Portrait of Fra Antonio Martelli wearing the habit of the Order of Malta (Caravaggio, 1608)

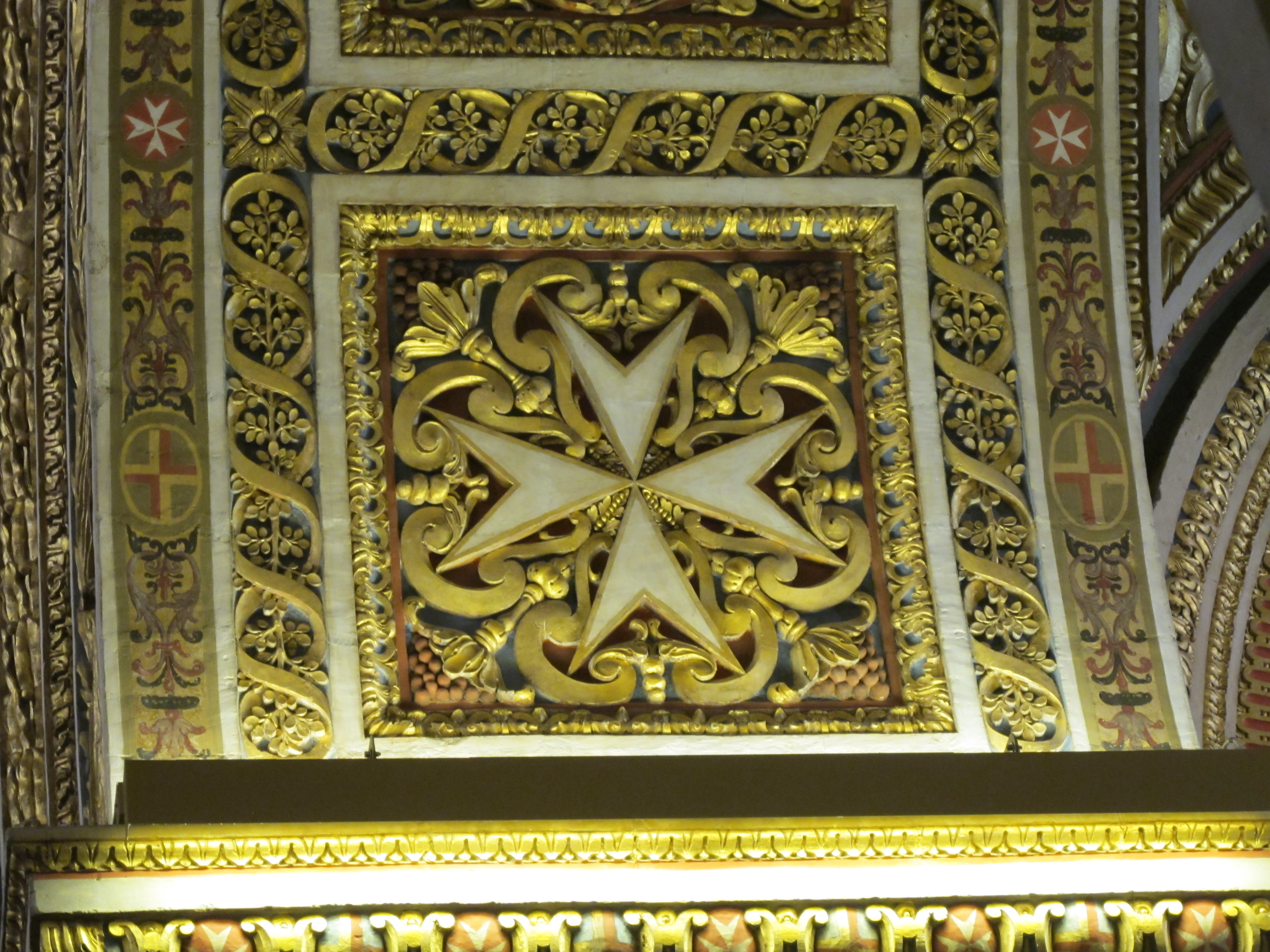
Ornamental Maltese cross on the ceiling of St. John's Co-Cathedral, Valletta, Malta (Mattia Preti, 1660s).

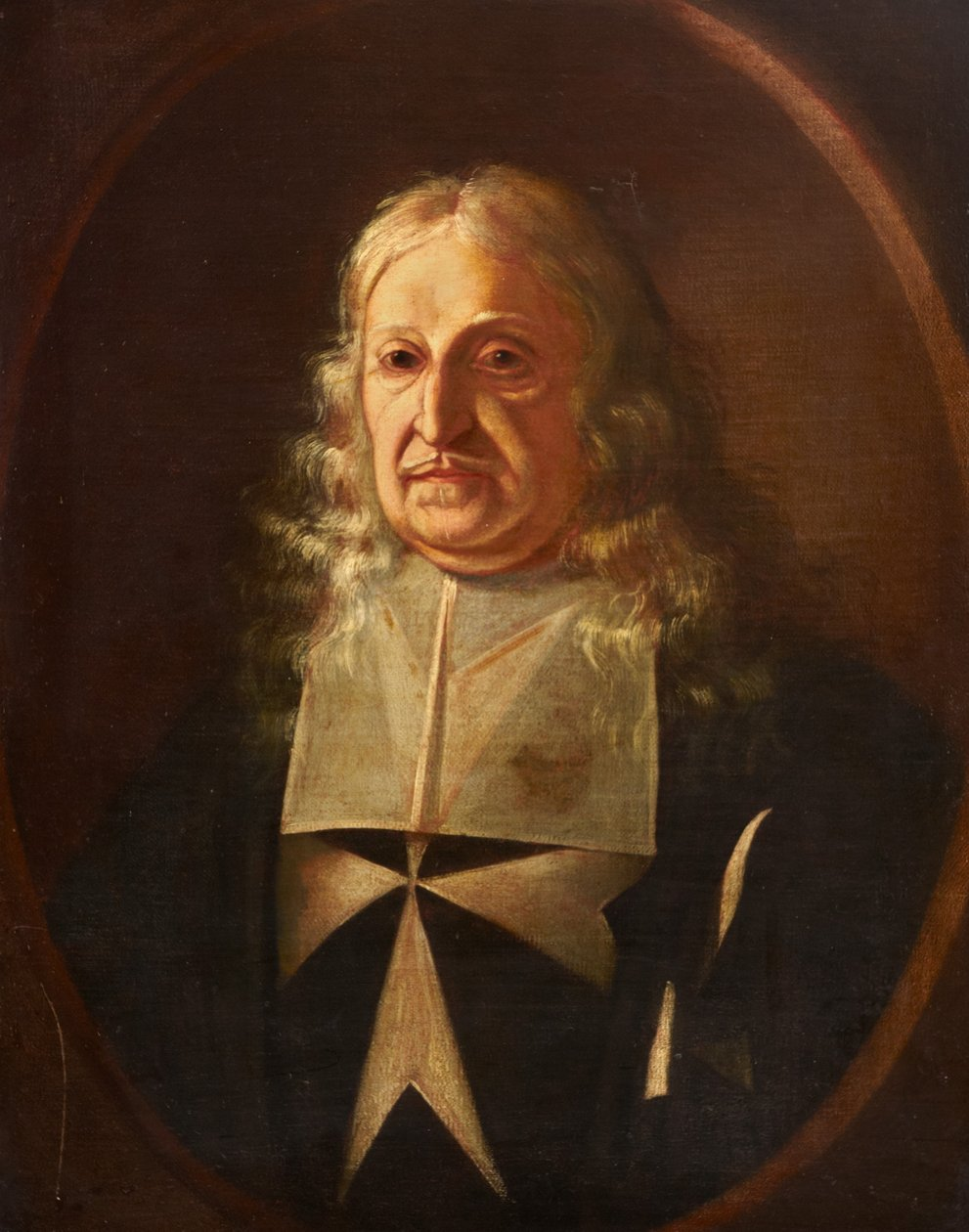
Portrait of Grand Master Gregorio Carafa (1680s)

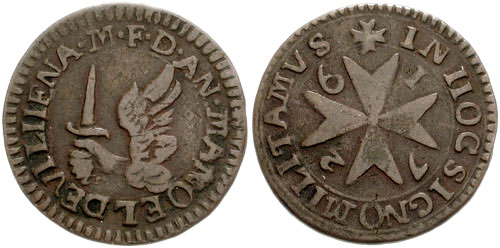
Maltese grano (1726)

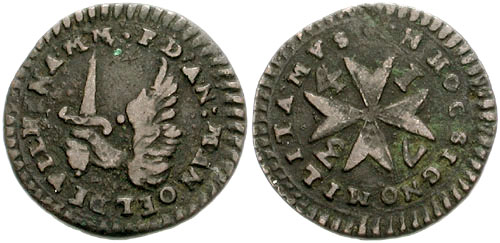
Maltese grano (1734)

== Symbolism ==
The Maltese cross as defined by the constitution of the Order of St. John remains the symbol of the Sovereign Military Order of Malta, of the Order of Saint John and its allied orders, of the Venerable Order of Saint John, and of their various service organisations. Numerous other modern orders of merit have used the eight-pointed cross. The British colony of Queensland, Australia, adopted the Maltese cross as the state badge and on the flag in 1876 for reasons unknown, its use continuing through to statehood.

The eight points of the eight-pointed cross have been given a number of symbolic interpretations, such as representing the eight Langues of the Knights Hospitaller (Auvergne, Provence, France, Aragon, Castille and Portugal, Italy, Germany, and the British Isles). or alternatively the "eight obligations or aspirations" of the knights.

Websites operated by both the German Order of Saint John (Johanniterorden) and the British Venerable Order of St John associate the eight points with the Eight Beatitudes. An undated leaflet published by The Venerable Order's main service organisation, St John Ambulance, has also applied secular meanings to the points as representing the traits of a good first aider.

== Modern use ==
=== Republic of Malta ===
Maltese civil ensign

The Maltese cross is displayed as part of the Maltese civil ensign, the Maltese naval jack and presidential standard has a Maltese cross in each corner. The Maltese euro coins of 1- and 2-euro denomination carry the Maltese cross. It is also the trademark of KM Malta Airlines, Malta's national airline.

The Maltese cross was depicted on the two-mils coin in of the Maltese lira in 1972, and on the reverse of one- and two-Euro coins introduced in January 2008.

=== Military and civil orders ===
Cross of the Order of Saint Stephen, founded in 1561

Tilted Maltese cross of the Order of Saints Maurice and Lazarus, founded in 1572 as an amalgamation and successor of the Order of Saint Lazarus with the Order of Saint Maurice, founded in 1434.

- Australian Military awards, the Distinguished Service Cross and Conspicuous Service Cross are modified versions of the Maltese Cross. The Distinguished Service Cross was introduced in 1991 and is awarded for distinguished command and leadership in warlike operations. The Conspicuous Service Cross (CSC) is awarded only for outstanding devotion to duty, or outstanding achievement in the application of exceptional skills, judgement or dedication, in non-warlike situations.
- Austria's two highest decorations, the Decoration of Honour for Services to the Republic of Austria and the Austrian Decoration for Science and Art, have the eight-pointed cross as their basis.
- In Belgium, the eight-pointed cross is the basis of two of the country's royal orders of merit, the Order of Leopold and the Order of Leopold II.

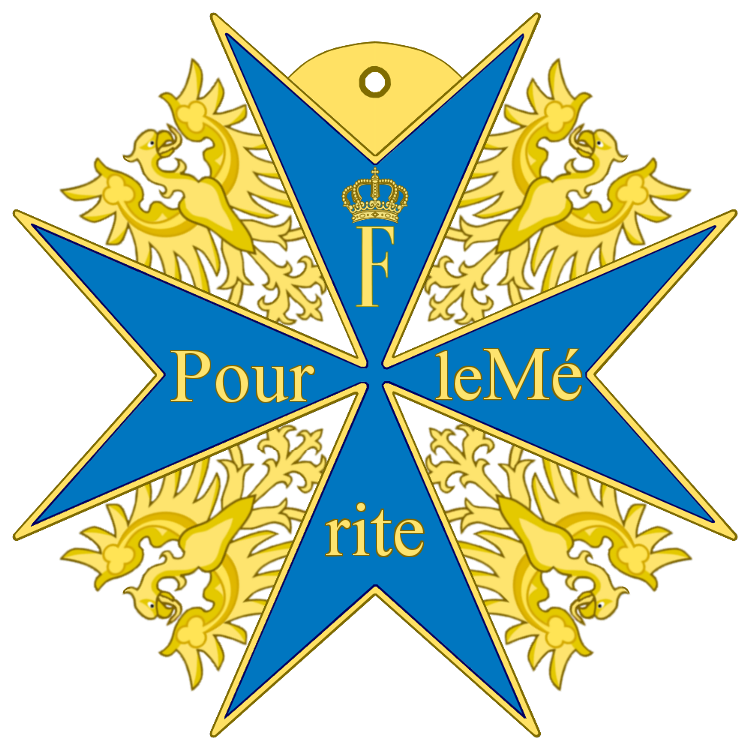
Pour le Mérite

- The Order of Bravery is the highest military decoration of the Kingdom of Bulgaria and of the Republic of Bulgaria and the most esteemed Bulgarian order.
- The Pour le Mérite, Imperial Germany's highest award for military valor, was a blue-enameled, eight-pointed cross with golden eagles between the arms. It was founded in 1740 by the francophile Prussian King Frederick the Great, and was adorned with the French legend Pour le Mérite ("For merit") in gold. Awards of the military class ceased with the dissolution of the Hohenzollern monarchy at the end of World War I in November 1918.
- The coats of arms of the former duchy of Mecklenburg-Strelitz and the former Mecklenburg-Strelitz district contained an eight-pointed cross. Several towns in Northern Germany have an eight-pointed cross on their coats of arms, including Malchin, Mirow, Moraas, Rastow, and Sülstorf. Heitersheim and Bad Dürrheim in Southern Germany also have an eight-pointed cross on their arms.
- In the Netherlands, the eight-pointed cross forms the basic form for the three highest royal orders of merit: the Orders of the Netherlands Lion, Orange-Nassau and the Gold Lion of the House of Nassau.
- In Latvia, the eight-pointed cross forms the basis for the collar of the Order of the Three Stars.
- In Norway, the eight-pointed cross is the symbol used in the Order of St. Olav.
- In the Philippines, the eight-pointed cross is a part of the pendant of the Quezon Service Cross, which is the highest honor that can be conferred in the republic. It is also found in the Order of Sikatuna, and Order of the Golden Heart.
- In Poland, the eight-pointed cross forms the basis for the country's four highest awards of merit: the Order of the White Eagle, Virtuti Militari, the Order of Polonia Restituta and the Order of the Military Cross.
- In Portugal, the eight-pointed cross forms the basis for the country's Order of Merit.
- The cross forms the basic form for some Spanish orders such as the Order of Charles III, the Order of Isabella the Catholic, the Order of Montesa, and the Order of Queen Maria Luisa.
- In Romania, an eight-pointed cross forms the basis for the National Order of Merit, Order of Agricultural Merit and historically Order of the Crown of Romania.
- In Sweden, an eight-pointed cross forms the basis for all the royal orders of merit: the Royal Order of the Seraphim, Order of the Sword, Order of the Polar Star, and Order of Vasa, as well as the Order of Saint John in Sweden.
- The eight-pointed cross forms the basis for the design of the Order of the Bath and the Royal Victorian Order.
- In France, the Maltese cross was the symbol of the Musketeers of Armagnac, the elite military group which supported Louis XIII and Louis XIV.
- In South Korea, the eight-pointed cross forms the basis for the Grand Order of Mugunghwa.

=== Regional and municipal heraldry ===
Flag of the city of Amalfi.

Naval Jack of Italy

- The Naval Jack of Italy features the national coat of arms of four of the former maritime republics with the "Amalfi cross" for Amalfi in the lower left. Besides the town of Amalfi which is its namesake, the cross is also displayed on various towns' coats of arms, such as Aicurzio, Rolo, San Giovanni di Gerace, Fasano, Gizzeria, Murello, Rodì Milici, Blufi, Ronchis, San Mauro la Bruca, and the Province of Salerno.
- Numerous French communes have the eight-pointed cross on their coats of arms. Among them are Drucourt, Eysines, and Valcanville in Normandy; Rimbachzell in Alsace; Saint-Jean-de-Bassel in Lorraine; Rontalon in Aquitaine; Chappes in Auvergne; Arvieu in Aveyron; and Auton and Vinon-sur-Verdon in Provence. The Territorial Collectivity of Saint Barthélemy also have an eight-pointed cross on its coat of arms.
- Many municipalities and civil parishes of Portugal, which territories were once part of the dominions of the Knights Hospitaller, include eight-pointed crosses in their coats of arms. Among them are Crato, Oliveira do Hospital, Proença-a-Nova, and Gavião.
- In Croatia, it is on the coat of arms of the town Ivanec, named after the Knights of Saint John.
- The 14th district of Prague has an eight-pointed cross on its coat of arms. It also appears on the coats of arms of several other Czech towns and villages, including Dobřichovice in Central Bohemia; Doubravice in South Bohemia; Staňkovice in the Ústí nad Labem Region; and Medlovice and Orlovice in South Moravia.
- The flag, badge, and coat of arms of the state of Queensland feature an eight-pointed cross, and as such, many public services incorporate the cross, including the Queensland police and ambulance services, then it was also incorporated into the Commonwealth Coat of Arms and the Queen's Personal Flag. The eight-pointed cross is part of the coat of arms of the University of Queensland. It is also part of the logo for various ambulance services in Australia, such as the South Australian Ambulance Service, the Queensland Ambulance Service, the New South Wales Ambulance, Ambulance Victoria, St John Ambulance Australia, and the Australian Capital Territory Ambulance Service. The cross known as the Fire Service Star is also used by Country Fire Authority in Victoria as an official symbol. It can be seen on uniform hats and on Long Service and Outstanding Service badges.
- Two Dutch towns, Ermelo and Montfoort, use the eight-pointed cross on their flags, and the former on its coat of arms, also.
- Several municipalities in Spain also use the eight-pointed cross on their flags and coats-of-arms, including Alguaire and Amposta in Catalonia, Arroyo de la Encomienda in Castile and León, Consuegra in Toledo, La Almunia de Doña Godina in Zaragoza, Lora del Río in Andalusia, O Barco de Valdeorras, Castrelo de Miño, O Incio, Larouco, O Páramo, A Pobra de Trives, Portomarín, Quiroga in Galicia, and Tomares in Andalusia.
- The Swedish municipality of Mönsterås uses an eight-pointed cross on its arms.
- The coat of arms of Bardonnex, in the Swiss Canton of Geneva, displays an eight-pointed cross.
- The eight-pointed cross appears on the coat of arms of the London Borough of Hackney.
- The eight-pointed cross appears on the coat of arms of Saint John, one of the parishes of Jersey.

=== Aviation ===
In 1967, laboratory tests, and flight tests at Fort Rucker and Fort Wolters, were conducted to determine the most highly visible and effective way to mark a helipad.

Twenty-five emblem designs were tested, but the emblem depicting four blurred rotor blades, referred to as the "Maltese cross", was selected as the standard heliport marking pattern by the Army for military heliports, and by the FAA for civil heliports.

However, in the late 1970s, the FAA administrator repealed this standard when it was charged that the Maltese cross was antisemitic. In the United States today, some helipads still remain bearing their original Maltese cross emblems.

The eight-pointed cross is also used to identify the final approach fix on FAA published approach plates. This is used on both precision and non-precision approaches.

=== Maritime ===
The vessel classification society for the United States, the American Bureau of Shipping, will assign the Maltese cross symbol to vessels and offshore units for which the hull construction and/or the manufacture of its machinery and components and any associated required testing, as applicable, is carried out under ABS survey.

=== Medical ===
Several orders that are descended from the original Order of St John set up first aid and ambulance services. These also incorporated the Maltese cross into their logos:

- St John Ambulance and its national organizations.
- The Order of Malta Ambulance Corps.
- The Johanniter-Unfall-Hilfe and the Malteser Hilfsdienst, the respective Protestant and Catholic ambulance services in Germany, have an eight-pointed cross in their emblems.
- Emergency medical services in Australia. This is due to the role of St John Ambulance, who continue to run the primary ambulance service in some states.
- The Bombeiros da Cruz de Malta (Maltese Cross Fire Brigade), a volunteer fire and medical emergency corps in Lisbon, Portugal, founded by Portuguese members of the Order of Malta.

=== Other ===
USVA headstone emblem 64

- The "Maltese Cross" was used by ancient Celts on grave slabs in Spain as early as 510 CE.
- The Huguenot cross, a symbol of French Protestants, is an eight-pointed cross with a dove.
- The United Protestant Church of France used an emblem that combined a stylized Latin cross and a Maltese cross.
- In Spain, the golden eight-pointed cross is the symbol used by the military medical corps.
- The football club AJ Auxerre, founded in 1905 by the priest Abbé Deschamps, has an eight-pointed cross as its emblem, adapted from that of the Catholic Association of French Youth.
- In India, the eight-pointed cross is the emblem used by the Garhwal Rifles and Rajputana Rifles. It was introduced as the emblem of the Central Provinces Police (CPP) during the British colonial era, and is still used by its successor—the Madhya Pradesh Police—to this day. It is also used by the Kolkata Police Force.
- Det Norske Veritas uses the eight-pointed cross as symbol in the class notifications telling that the ship is constructed under their monitoring.
- In the Philippines, the eight-pointed cross is part of the school seal of Colegio de San Juan de Letran. It was founded by Don Juan Alonso Jeronimo Guerrero, a retired Spanish officer and one of the Knights of Malta and Fray Diego de Santa María, O.P., a Dominican brother.
- The eight-pointed cross is used by the Swedish Mounted Royal Guards as their emblem.
- The eight-pointed cross is the trademark of the oldest continuously operated Swiss watch manufacturer, Vacheron Constantin founded in 1755.

The badge of the British Army's Bermuda Regiment combines the eight-pointed cross of rifle regiments with elements from that of the Royal Artillery.

Coat of arms of Saint John, Jersey

- In the United Kingdom, the eight-pointed cross is the symbol used by rifle regiments, and has been incorporated into the badges of virtually all rifle units, including the cap badge of the Bermuda Regiment, officers' cross belt of the Gurkha Rifles and now amalgamated, the Royal Green Jackets.
- The first postmark employed for the cancellation of the then new British postage stamps in the 1840s was the shape of an eight-pointed cross and named accordingly.
- The eight-pointed cross appears on the shirts of St Mark's FC (West Gorton), the forebears of Manchester City Football Club.
- The eight-pointed cross is the insignia of Methodist College Belfast, and it appears on the blazers of the sixth-form pupils as its crest.
- The eight-pointed cross is also the symbol of Neath Rugby Football Club.
- It is the symbol of the Royal Shrewsbury School Boat Club, displayed on the oars and uniform of the 1st VIII.
- The eight-pointed cross with eagle, globe, and anchor in the center is used for the sharpshooter badge in the United States Marine Corps.
- Malta Boat Club, a sculling club on Philadelphia's Boathouse Row, uses the eight-pointed cross as its logo.
- Phi Kappa Sigma, an international all-male college secret and social fraternity, uses an eight-pointed cross as its symbol.
- The Yale University School of Nursing uses the eight-pointed cross on its official shield.
- The Veterans of Foreign Wars of the United States (VFW), an organization of military veterans, uses the eight-pointed cross in its official emblem.
- In US York Rite Freemasonry, the Knights Templar (Freemasonry) use the eight-pointed cross in the Order of the Knights of Malta.
- The Military Division of the Kappa Alpha Order, composed of members serving in or honorably discharged from the U.S. Armed Forces, uses an eight-pointed cross in the colors of The Order.
- The Drummoyne Rowing Club, a rowing club in Sydney, Australia uses the eight-pointed cross as part of its logo.

=== Science and pathology ===
The Maltese cross also describes a microscopic structure found during the diagnosis of the tick-borne disease babesiosis. The characteristic tetrad structure of the Babesia merozoites, visible in a peripheral blood smear, is often referred to as the "Maltese-cross form" to distinguish it from the merozoites of malaria.

=== United Kingdom railway ticketing ===
On the National Rail network, tickets marked with a Maltese cross are valid for travel on London Underground, Docklands Light Railway and Thameslink between two London Terminals, allowing passengers to make journeys that cross London. Passengers can break their journey at any intermediate station but cannot then resume their journey by Tube, DLR or Thameslink using their cross-London ticket.

Passengers holding tickets to a London fare zone marked with a Maltese cross can make one journey from the London Terminal at which they arrived to the zone in question.

== Eponymy ==
The "Maltese cross flower" (Lychnis chalcedonica) is so named because its petals are similarly shaped, though its points are more rounded into "heart"-like shapes. The flower Tripterocalyx crux-maltae was also named for the Maltese cross. The Geneva drive, a device that translates a continuous rotation into an intermittent rotary motion, is also sometimes called a "Maltese cross mechanism" after the shape of its main gear.

== Similar crosses ==
Standard form of the cross pattée

Firefighter's Cross, often mistaken for a Maltese cross

Eight-pointed crosses were adopted for use by the French Order of Saint Lazarus in the mid-16th century. The use of the green eight-pointed cross by the Order was retained right through to the 19th century and after the secular organization of the Order after 1910.

It has been the official badge (combined with an ellipsoid in the center) of the Delta Phi fraternity since 1833. A similar cross is also used by the Veterans of Foreign Wars organization.

A variant of the Maltese cross, with three V-shaped arms instead of four, was used as the funnel symbol of the Hamburg Atlantic Line and their successors German Atlantic Line and Hanseatic Tours in 1958–1973 and 1991–1997.

A five-armed variant is the "Cross" of the French Legion of Honour (Croix de la Légion d'honneur).

A seven-armed variant, known as the "Maltese asterisk", is used as the basis of Britain's Order of St Michael and St George.

Other crosses with spreading limbs are often mistakenly called "Maltese", especially the cross pattée. The royal warrant which created the Victoria Cross prescribed a Maltese cross, but the medal has always in fact been a cross pattée. The official symbol of the Alpha Tau Omega fraternity is the cross pattée, though the organization's founder thought it was a Maltese cross when the organization was formed in 1865. The Nestorian cross also is very similar to both of these. The Unicode character “✠” (U+2720) is called a Maltese cross, but is in fact a cross pattée.

The Firefighter's Cross is often confused with the Maltese cross (for example, the New York City Fire Department so calls it); although it may have eight or more points, it also has large curved arcs between the points. The Philadelphia Fire Department, among others, incorporates the Firefighter's Cross into its insignia, as does the International Association of Fire Fighters.

The Maltese cross should not be mistaken for the George Cross, awarded to Malta by George VI of the United Kingdom in 1942, which is depicted, since 1964, on the national flag of Malta. The Maltese cross is depicted on the civil ensign of Malta, shown above.

== See also ==
- Wilhelm Stetter (Renaissance-era painter known as "Master W. S. with the Maltese cross")
- Garhwal Rifles
- Iron Cross
- Order of Malta
- Order of Malta Ambulance Corps
- Pour le Mérite
- Royal Green Jackets
- Babesiosis
