= Doubravice =

Doubravice may refer to places in the Czech Republic:

- Doubravice (České Budějovice District), a municipality and village in the South Bohemian Region
- Doubravice (Strakonice District), a municipality and village in the South Bohemian Region
- Doubravice (Trutnov District), a municipality and village in the Hradec Králové Region
- Doubravice nad Svitavou, a town in the South Moravian Region
- Doubravice, a village and part of Homole u Panny in the Ústí nad Labem Region
- Doubravice, a village and part of Hrubá Skála in the Liberec Region
- Doubravice, a village and part of Katusice in the Central Bohemian Region
- Doubravice, a village and part of Leština (Ústí nad Orlicí District) in the Pardubice Region
- Doubravice, a village and part of Moravičany in the Olomouc Region
- Doubravice, a village and part of Nahořany in the Hradec Králové Region
- Doubravice, a village and part of Nečtiny in the Plzeň Region
- Doubravice, a village and part of Pardubice in the Pardubice Region
- Doubravice, a village and part of Sedlčany in the Central Bohemian Region
- Doubravice, a village and part of Železnice in the Hradec Králové Region
- Doubravice 1.díl, a village and part of Přestavlky u Čerčan in the Central Bohemian Region
- Doubravice 2.díl, a village and part of Vranov (Benešov District) in the Central Bohemian Region
- Doubravice u České Skalice, a village and part of Rychnovek in the Hradec Králové Region
- Doubravice u Volyně, a village and part of Čestice (Strakonice District) in the South Bohemian Region
