= Zvole =

Zvole may refer to places in the Czech Republic:

- Zvole (Prague-West District), a municipality and village in the Central Bohemian Region
- Zvole (Šumperk District), a municipality and village in the Olomouc Region
- Zvole (Žďár nad Sázavou District), a municipality and village in the Vysočina Region
- Zvole, a village and part of Rychnovek in the Hradec Králové Region
