= Staňkovice =

Staňkovice may refer to places in the Czech Republic:

- Staňkovice (Kutná Hora District), a municipality and village in the Central Bohemian Region
- Staňkovice (Litoměřice District), a municipality and village in the Ústí nad Labem Region
- Staňkovice (Louny District), a municipality and village in the Ústí nad Labem Region
