= Johann Loesel =

Knight of the Order of Saint John (c. 1390–1460)

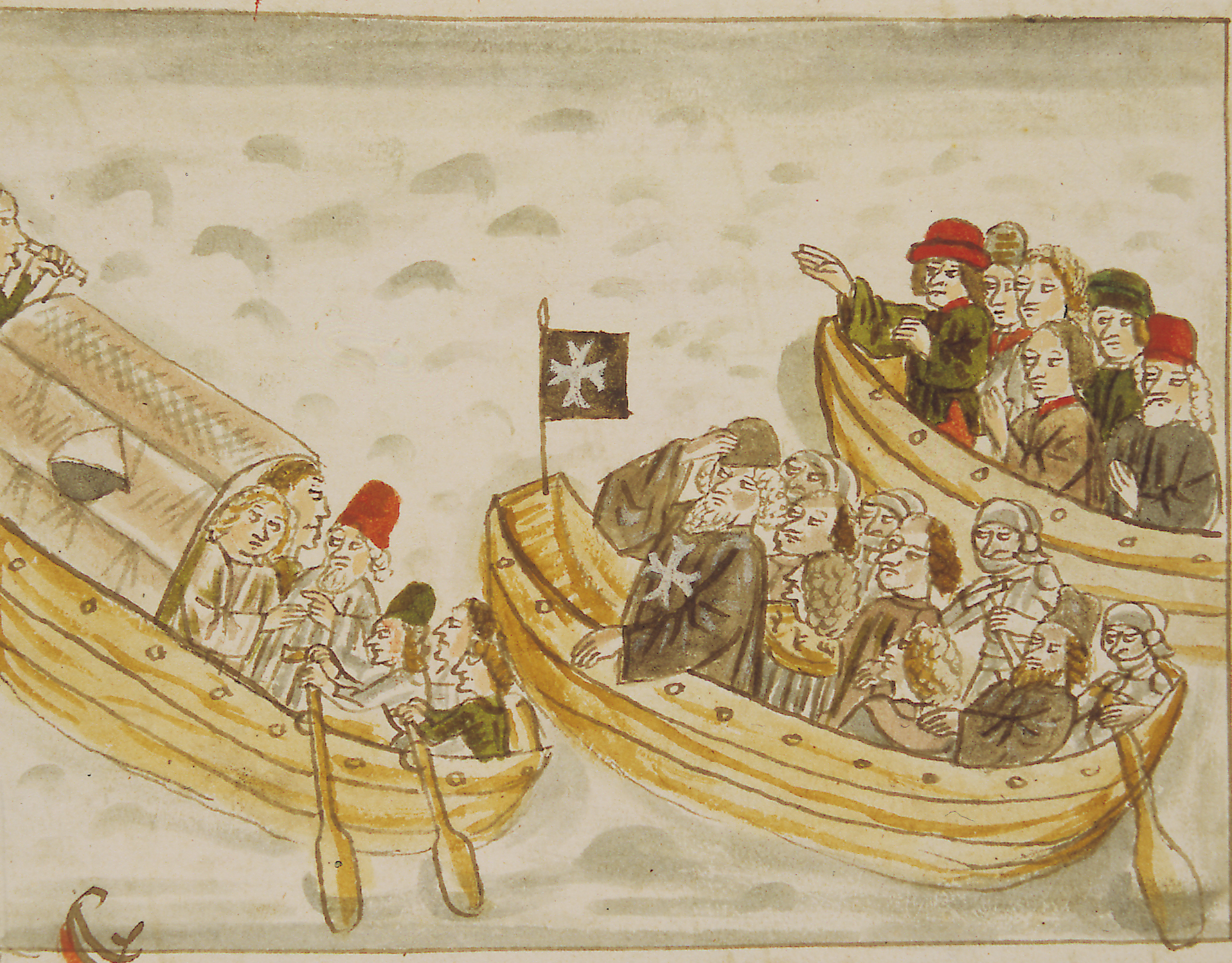
Johann Loesel, shown with the eight-pointed cross on a flag and his habit in his role as mediator in the Old Zürich War in February 1446 (illustration of Gerold Edlibach's chronicle, c. 1500)

Johann Loesel (c. 1390–1460) was a knight of the Order of Saint John, during 1440–1444 grand bailiff from and 1445–1460 grand prior of the grand priory of Alemannia (Upper Germany), a division of the order within the langue of Germany.

A native of Strasbourg, Loesel joined the order at Eichen (Eichhof) near Weißenburg. In 1426, he was given the commandery of Mainz. He acted as commander at Mainz during 1429–1439. In 1434, he also received command of Rheinfelden. In 1440, he was given the rank of great bailiff at Rhodes, an office created for the German tongue of the order in 1428. The grand bailiff of the German tongue was responsible for the fortifications of Rhodes. In 1444, Loesel was made grand prior of Germany, resigning from the office of grand bailiff and returning to Europe. He was responsible for the commanderies of Basel, Bubikon, Leuggern and Wädenswil, mostly residing in Wädenswil. In February 1446 he acted as mediator between Zürich and the Swiss Confederacy in the Old Zürich War. The delegates met on boats on Lake Zürich, with Loesel mediating peace talks rom his own boat. The mediation did not result in a peace treaty, and the war continued for another four years, until the treaty of Kappel of 8 April 1450. The commandery at Rheinfelden was destroyed in an attack by Hans von Rechberg in 1449. In 1455, Loesel was in Vienna at the court of Archduke Albert to ask for permission to rebuild the destroyed commandery. In the following year, he was present at the building site in Rheinfelden, designating the site for the new chapel. In 1456, he sponsored the rebuilding of the church at Wädenswil. He died on 8 April 1460 and was buried in the order's church there. The church has been destroyed and his epitaph is not extant except in a drawing.
