= Katusice =

- Municipality
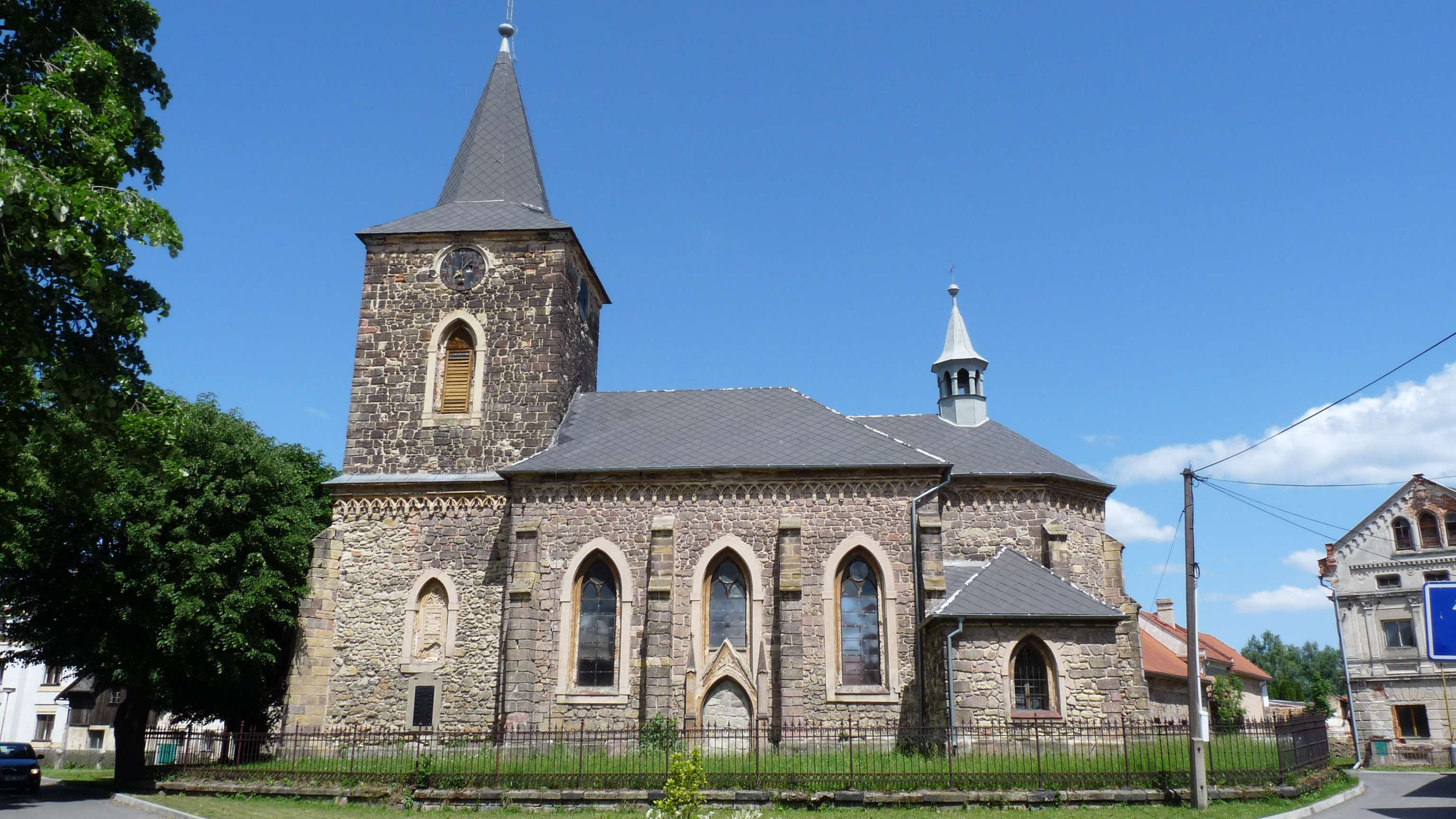
- Church of the Assumption of the Virgin Mary

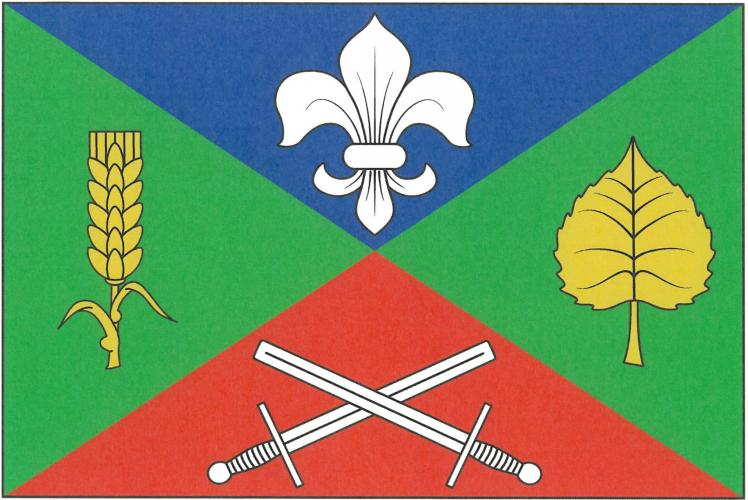
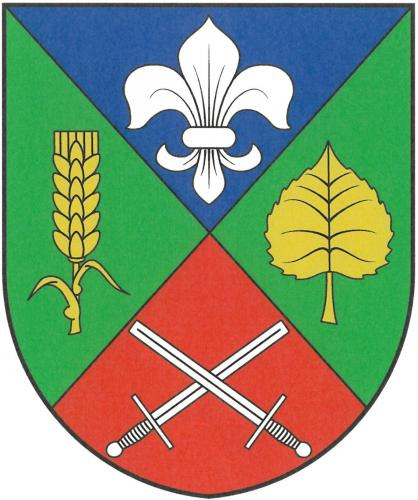
- Flag Coat of arms

- Location in the Czech Republic
- Coordinates: 50°26′43″N 14°46′39″E
- Country: Czech Republic
- Region: Central Bohemian
- District: Mladá Boleslav
- First mentioned: 1352

Area
  - Total: 16.13 km^{2} (6.23 sq mi)
- Elevation: 308 m (1,010 ft)

Population (2026-01-01)
  - Total: 853
  - Density: 52.9/km^{2} (137/sq mi)
- Time zone: UTC+1 (CET)
  - Summer (DST): UTC+2 (CEST)
- Postal codes: 294 25, 294 26
- Website: obec-katusice.cz

Katusice is a municipality and village in Mladá Boleslav District in the Central Bohemian Region of the Czech Republic. It has about 900 inhabitants.

== Administrative division ==
Katusice consists of five municipal parts (in brackets population according to the 2021 census):

- Katusice (639)
- Doubravice (19)
- Spikaly (77)
- Trnová (43)
- Valovice (50)

Doubravice and Trnová form an exclave of the municipal territory.

== Etymology ==
The name is derived from the personal name Katous, meaning "the village of Katous' people".

== Geography ==
Katusice is located about 10 kilometres (6 mi) west of Mladá Boleslav and 41 km (25 mi) northeast of Prague. It lies in the Jizera Table. The highest point is the hill Bezvel at 340 m (1,120 ft) above sea level.

== History ==
The first written mention of Katusice is from 1352, when the local church was documented.

== Demographics ==
Historical population

Year	Pop.	±%
1869	1,016	—
1880	1,118	+10.0%
1890	1,145	+2.4%
1900	1,139	−0.5%
1910	1,216	+6.8%

Year	Pop.	±%
1921	1,283	+5.5%
1930	1,252	−2.4%
1950	873	−30.3%
1961	980	+12.3%
1970	910	−7.1%

Year	Pop.	±%
1980	806	−11.4%
1991	786	−2.5%
2001	796	+1.3%
2011	785	−1.4%
2021	828	+5.5%

Source: Censuses

== Transport ==
Katusice is located on the railway line Mělník–Mladějov, but in the off season it is only in operation on weekends.

== Sights ==
The main landmark of Katusice is the Church of the Assumption of the Virgin Mary. It is a neo-Gothic church with a Gothic-Renaissance core. It was built in 1853–1857.
