= Leština (Ústí nad Orlicí District) =

- Municipality
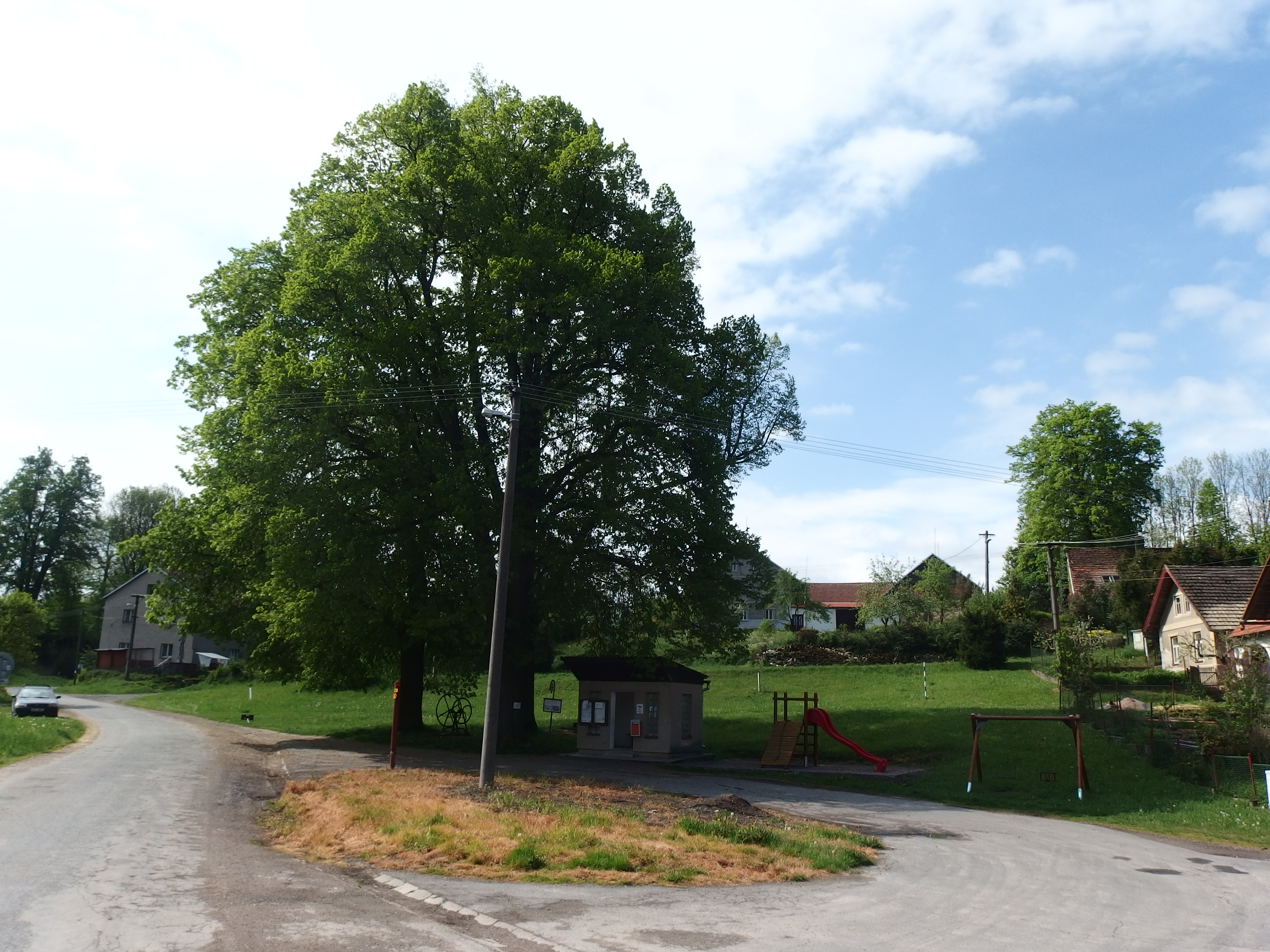
- Doubravice, a part of Leština

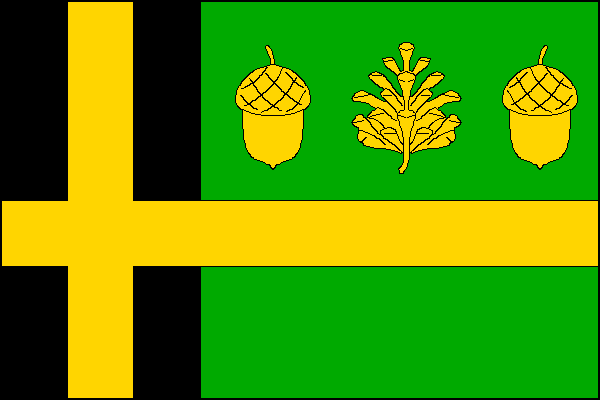
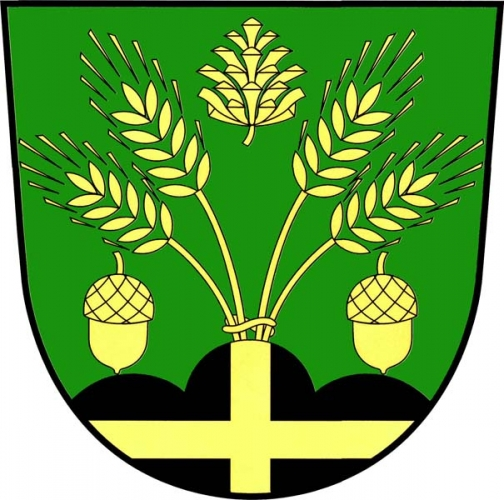
- Flag Coat of arms

- Location in the Czech Republic
- Coordinates: 49°52′4″N 16°7′4″E
- Country: Czech Republic
- Region: Pardubice
- District: Ústí nad Orlicí
- First mentioned: 1461

Area
  - Total: 10.73 km^{2} (4.14 sq mi)
- Elevation: 418 m (1,371 ft)

Population (2026-01-01)
  - Total: 357
  - Density: 33.3/km^{2} (86.2/sq mi)
- Time zone: UTC+1 (CET)
  - Summer (DST): UTC+2 (CEST)
- Postal code: 539 44
- Website: www.obeclestina.cz

Leština (German: Leschtina) is a municipality and village in Ústí nad Orlicí District in the Pardubice Region of the Czech Republic. It has about 400 inhabitants.

== Administrative division ==
Leština consists of four municipal parts (in brackets population according to the 2021 census):

- Leština (148)
- Doubravice (85)
- Dvořiště (61)
- Podhořany u Nových Hradů (41)

== Demographics ==
Historical population
Year	Pop.	±%
1869	974	—
1880	1,016	+4.3%
1890	1,008	−0.8%
1900	950	−5.8%
1910	950	+0.0%
1921	914	−3.8%
1930	896	−2.0%
1950	659	−26.5%
1961	635	−3.6%
1970	504	−20.6%
1980	408	−19.0%
1991	358	−12.3%
2001	322	−10.1%
2011	267	−17.1%
2021	335	+25.5%
Source: Censuses
