= Order of Agricultural Merit (Romania) =

Award for agricultural contributions

Order of Agricultural Merit Ordinul Meritul Agricol
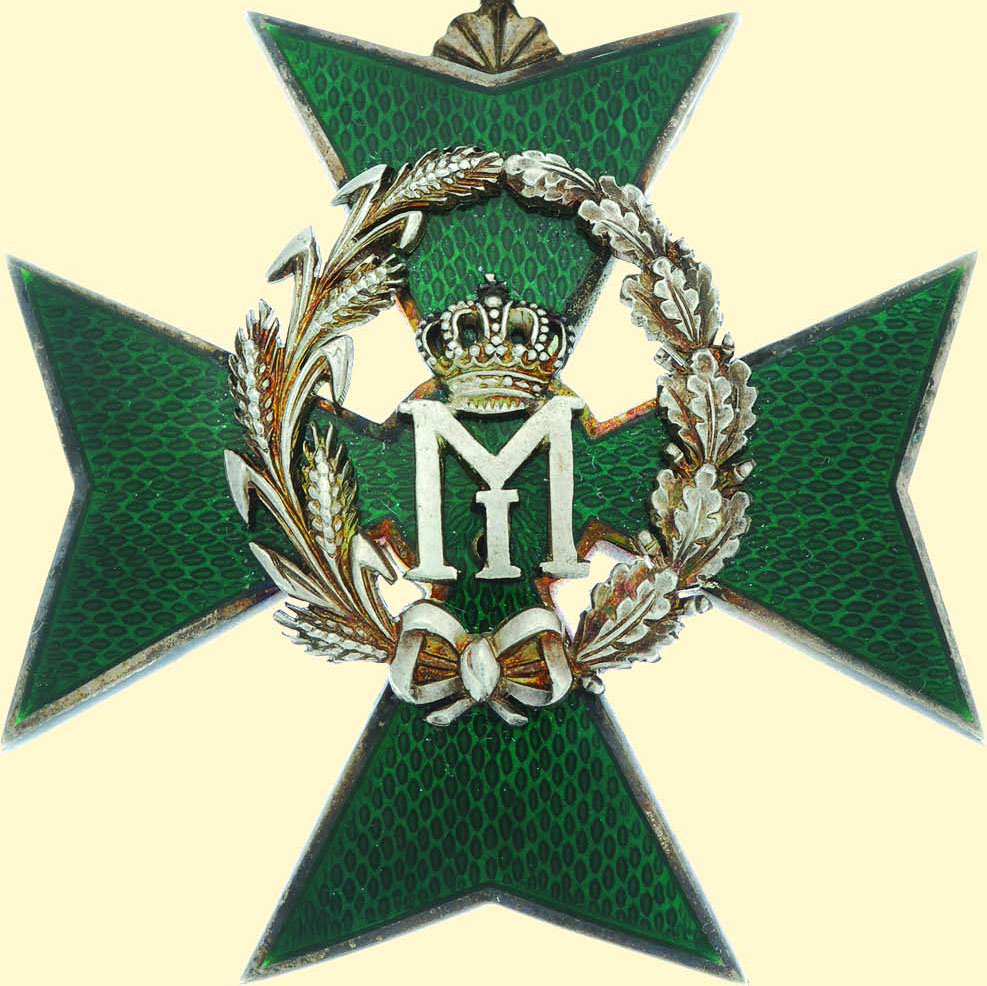
- Star of the Order

Awarded by King of Romania
- Type: State decoration
- Religious affiliation: Romanian Orthodox
- Ribbon: Green with a Gold stripe in the Middle.
- Eligibility: Romanian and Foreign Citizens
- Awarded for: Outstanding contributions to Agriculture.
- Status: Abolished in 1947
- Sovereign: King Michael I of Romania
- Grades: Sovereign Knight Grand Officer; Knight/Dame Commander; Knight/Dame Officer; Knight/Dame; Medals

Precedence
- Next (higher): Order of St. George
- Next (lower): Order of Faithful Service
- Related: Decorations of Culture
- The Ribbon of the Order

The Order of Agricultural Merit was established with the intention of awarding Romanian and Foreign Civilians who made contributions to Agriculture, especially after the Great Depression that Romania was steadily recovering from.

== History ==
The Order was abolished during the abolishment of the Romanian Monarchy in 1947.

The Order was reinstated during the Socialist Republic of Romania and abolished after the Romanian Revolution.

On 31 March 2000, the Order was reinstated again.

== Grades ==
There are four grades of this merit: Grand Officer, Commander, Officer, and Knight.
