= Orlovice =

- Municipality
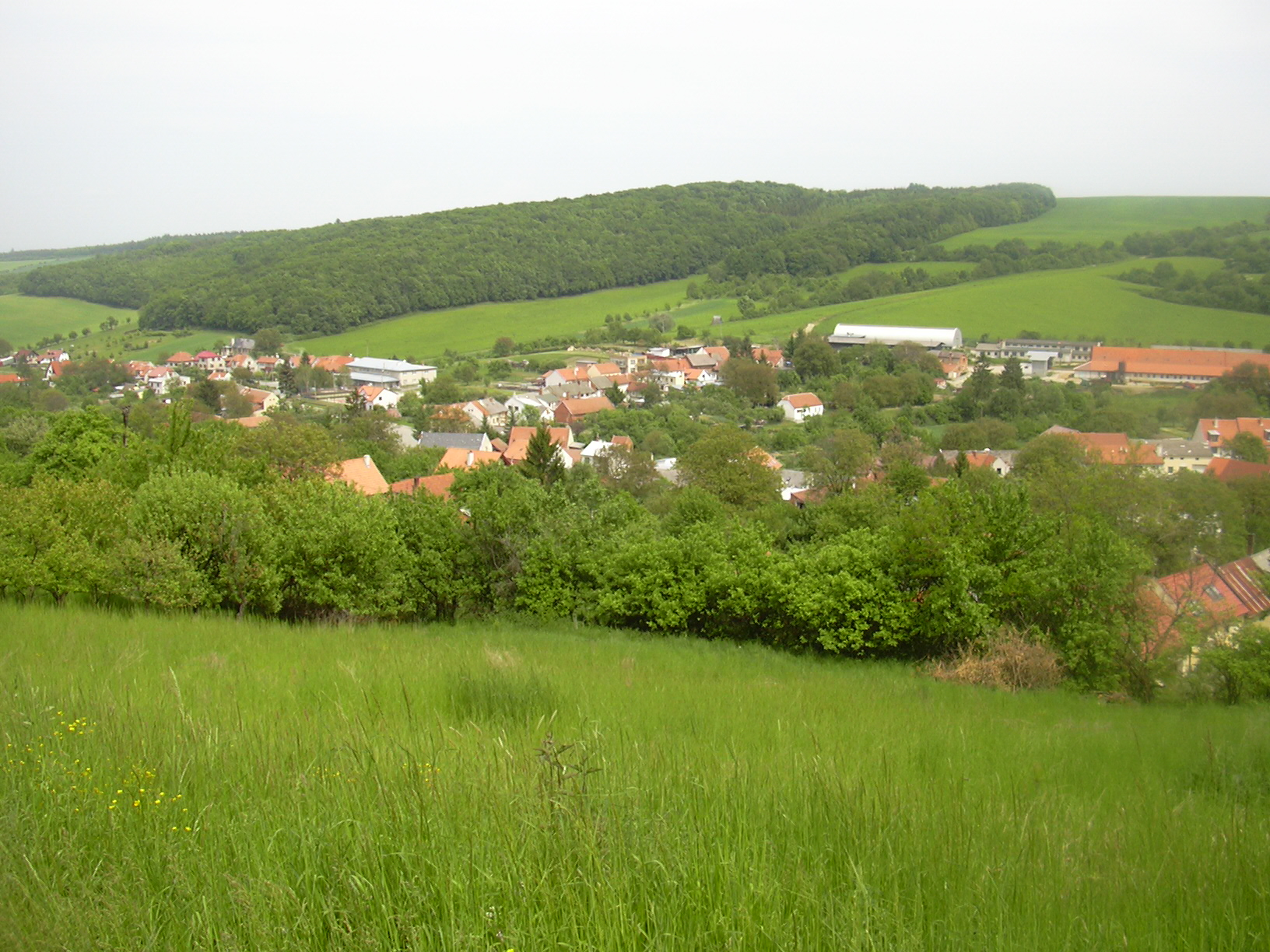
- General view

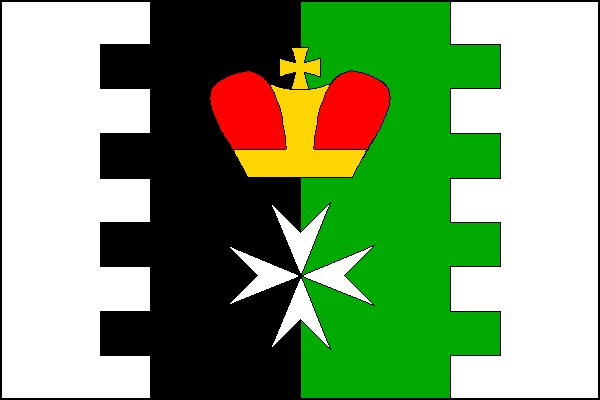
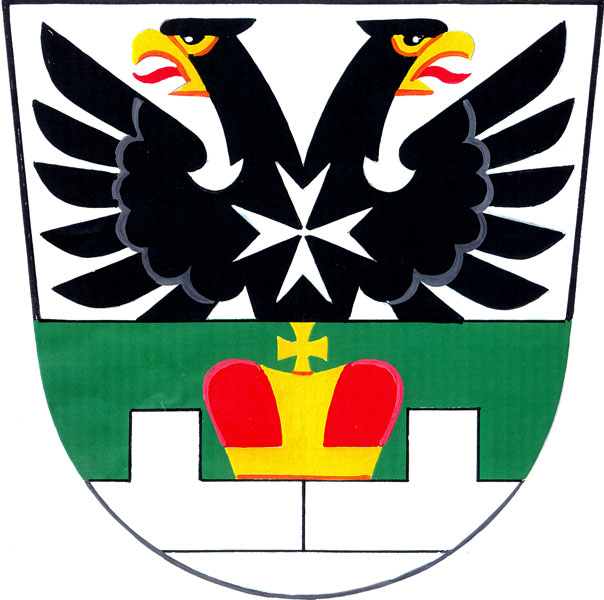
- Flag Coat of arms

- Location in the Czech Republic
- Coordinates: 49°14′21″N 17°5′37″E
- Country: Czech Republic
- Region: South Moravian
- District: Vyškov
- First mentioned: 1328

Area
  - Total: 14.47 km^{2} (5.59 sq mi)
- Elevation: 320 m (1,050 ft)

Population (2026-01-01)
  - Total: 304
  - Density: 21.0/km^{2} (54.4/sq mi)
- Time zone: UTC+1 (CET)
  - Summer (DST): UTC+2 (CEST)
- Postal code: 682 01
- Website: www.obecorlovice.cz

Orlovice is a municipality and village in Vyškov District in the South Moravian Region of the Czech Republic. It has about 300 inhabitants.

Orlovice lies approximately 8 kilometres (5 mi) south-east of Vyškov, 35 km (22 mi) east of Brno, and 215 km (134 mi) south-east of Prague.

== Demographics ==
Historical population
Year	Pop.	±%
1869	477	—
1880	493	+3.4%
1890	519	+5.3%
1900	545	+5.0%
1910	627	+15.0%
1921	598	−4.6%
1930	579	−3.2%
1950	560	−3.3%
1961	533	−4.8%
1970	490	−8.1%
1980	408	−16.7%
1991	330	−19.1%
2001	307	−7.0%
2011	310	+1.0%
2021	333	+7.4%
Source: Censuses
