= Nečtiny =

- Municipality
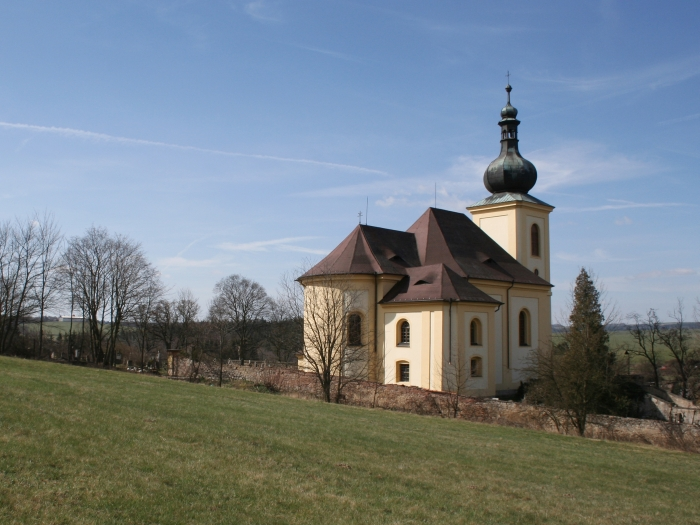
- Church of Saint James the Great

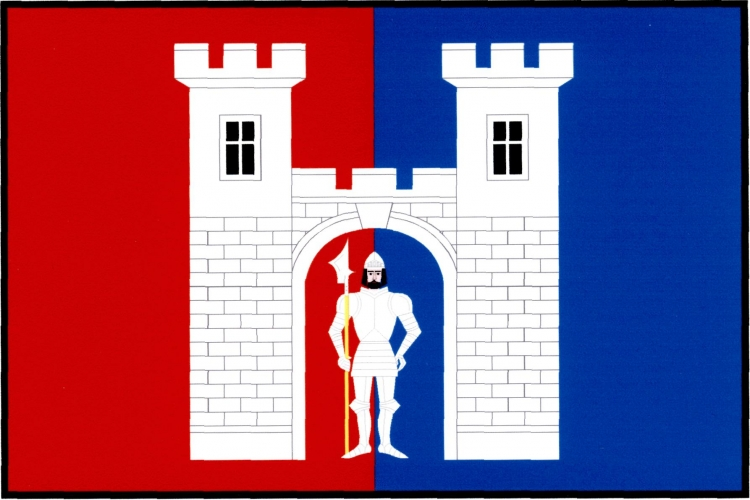
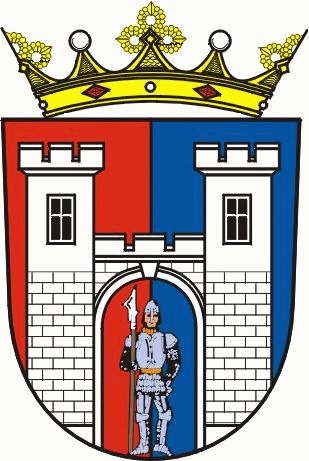
- Flag Coat of arms

- Location in the Czech Republic
- Coordinates: 49°58′30″N 13°9′53″E
- Country: Czech Republic
- Region: Plzeň
- District: Plzeň-North
- First mentioned: 1169

Area
  - Total: 52.50 km^{2} (20.27 sq mi)
- Elevation: 478 m (1,568 ft)

Population (2026-01-01)
  - Total: 642
  - Density: 12.2/km^{2} (31.7/sq mi)
- Time zone: UTC+1 (CET)
  - Summer (DST): UTC+2 (CEST)
- Postal code: 331 63
- Website: www.nectiny.cz

Nečtiny is a municipality and village in Plzeň-North District in the Plzeň Region of the Czech Republic. It has about 600 inhabitants.

Nečtiny lies approximately 30 kilometres (19 mi) north-west of Plzeň and 92 km (57 mi) west of Prague.

== Administrative division ==
Nečtiny consists of 12 municipal parts (in brackets population according to the 2021 census):

- Nečtiny (314)
- Březín (78)
- Čestětín (18)
- Doubravice (13)
- Hrad Nečtiny (95)
- Jedvaniny (10)
- Kamenná Hora (3)
- Leopoldov (4)
- Lešovice (18)
- Nové Městečko (8)
- Plachtín (40)
- Račín (0)

== Demographics ==
Historical population
Year	Pop.	±%
1869	3,147	—
1880	3,249	+3.2%
1890	3,158	−2.8%
1900	2,844	−9.9%
1910	2,803	−1.4%
1921	2,596	−7.4%
1930	2,414	−7.0%
1950	1,012	−58.1%
1961	930	−8.1%
1970	826	−11.2%
1980	725	−12.2%
1991	634	−12.6%
2001	612	−3.5%
2011	620	+1.3%
2021	601	−3.1%
Source: Censuses
