= Medlovice (Vyškov District) =

- Municipality
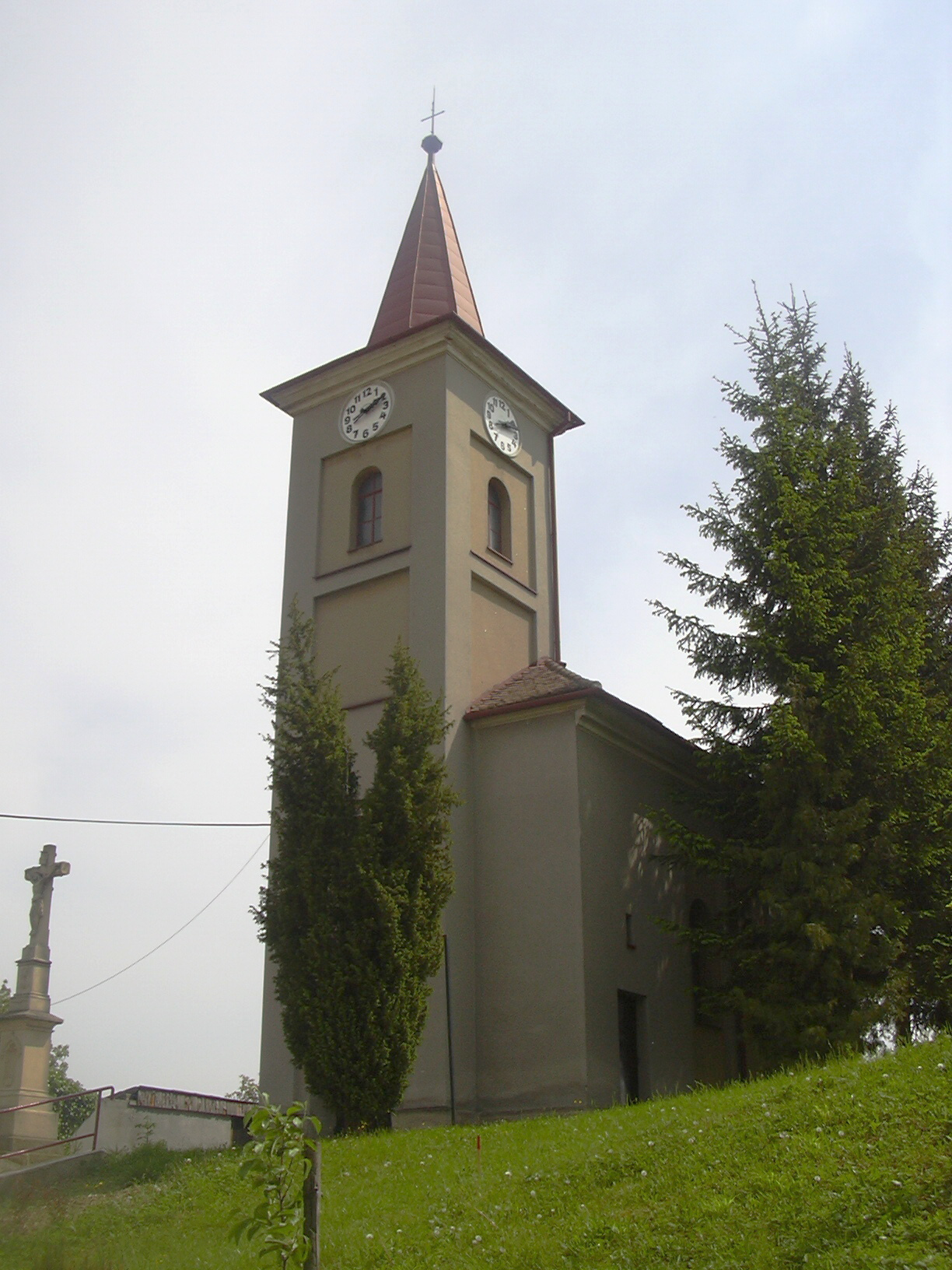
- Chapel of Saint Francis of Assisi

- Flag Coat of arms

- Location in the Czech Republic
- Coordinates: 49°16′28″N 17°5′35″E
- Country: Czech Republic
- Region: South Moravian
- District: Vyškov
- First mentioned: 1390

Area
  - Total: 3.61 km^{2} (1.39 sq mi)
- Elevation: 214 m (702 ft)

Population (2026-01-01)
  - Total: 442
  - Density: 122/km^{2} (317/sq mi)
- Time zone: UTC+1 (CET)
  - Summer (DST): UTC+2 (CEST)
- Postal code: 682 01
- Website: www.medlovice.cz

Medlovice is a municipality and village in Vyškov District in the South Moravian Region of the Czech Republic. It has about 400 inhabitants.

Medlovice lies approximately 8 kilometres (5 mi) east of Vyškov, 36 km (22 mi) east of Brno, and 213 km (132 mi) south-east of Prague.

== Demographics ==
Historical population
Year	Pop.	±%
1869	317	—
1880	330	+4.1%
1890	358	+8.5%
1900	377	+5.3%
1910	397	+5.3%
1921	410	+3.3%
1930	371	−9.5%
1950	367	−1.1%
1961	354	−3.5%
1970	358	+1.1%
1980	341	−4.7%
1991	319	−6.5%
2001	331	+3.8%
2011	309	−6.6%
2021	355	+14.9%
Source: Censuses
