= Rychnovek =

- Municipality
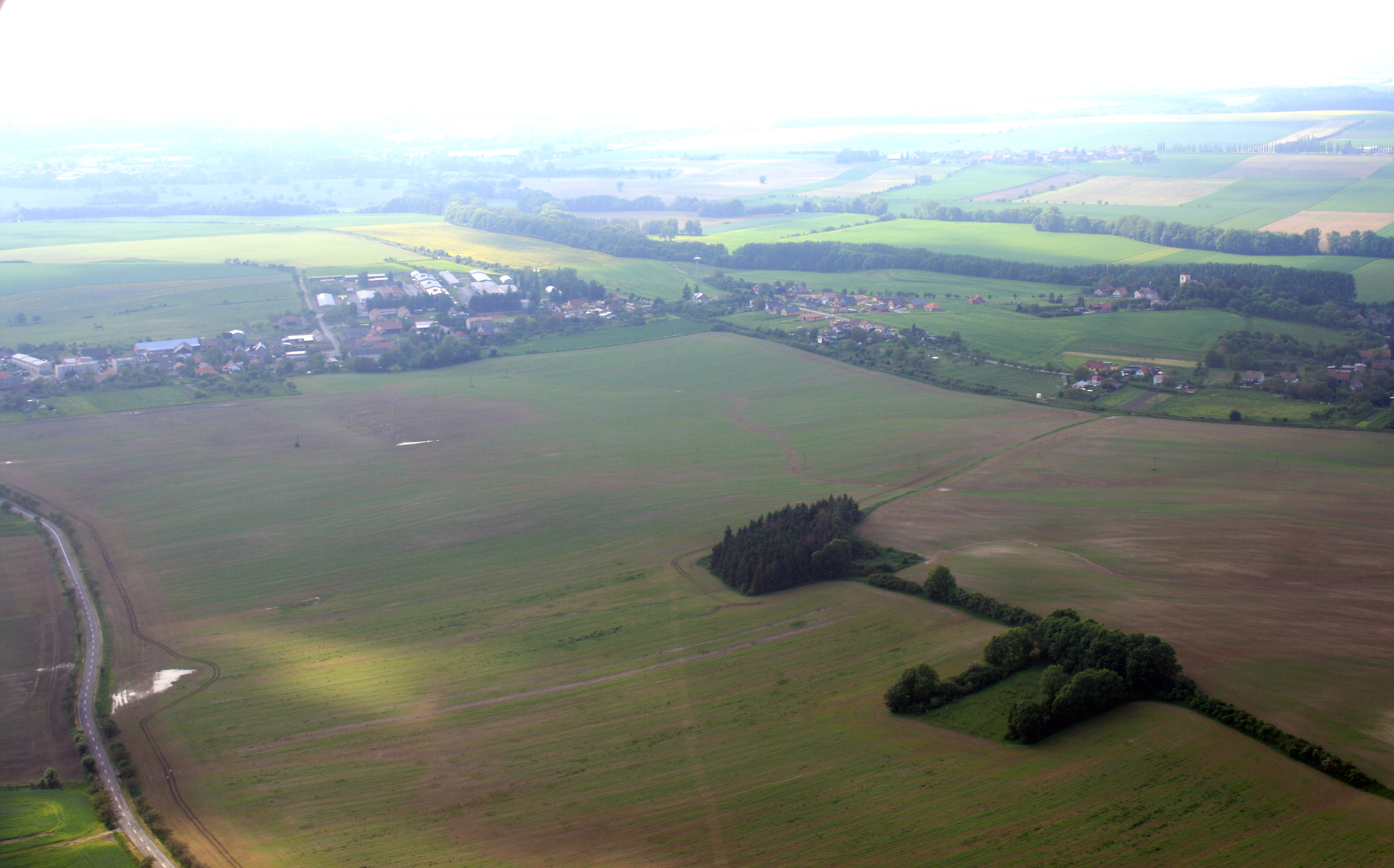
- Aerial view

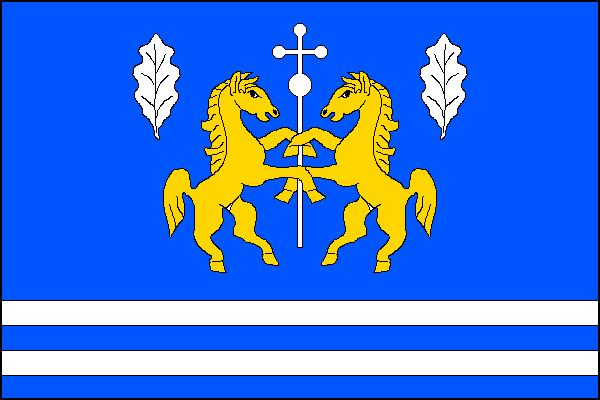
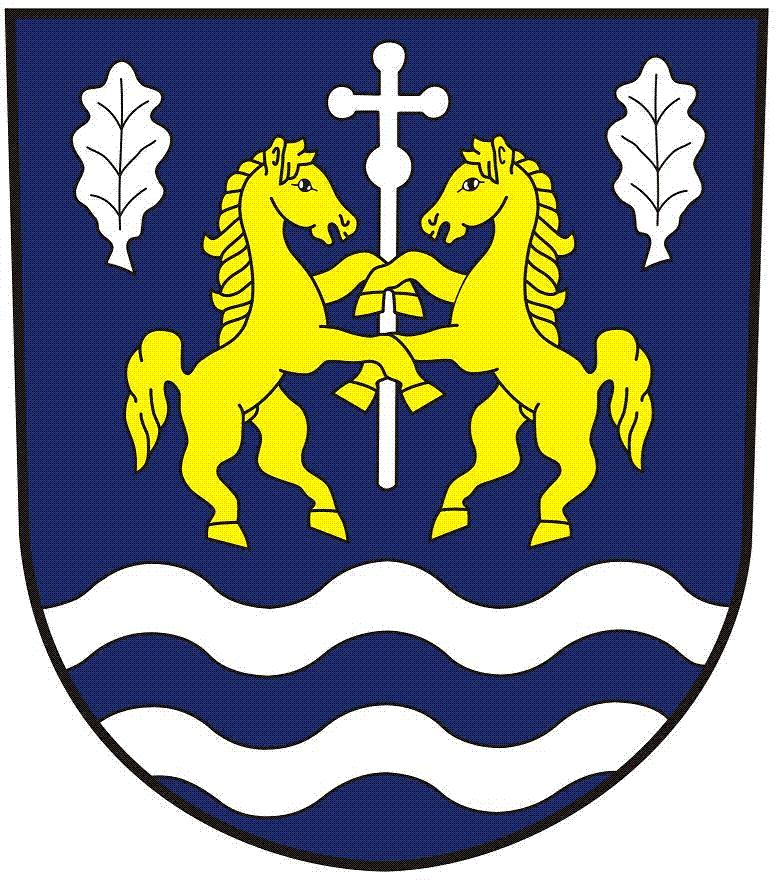
- Flag Coat of arms

- Location in the Czech Republic
- Coordinates: 50°21′27″N 15°58′13″E
- Country: Czech Republic
- Region: Hradec Králové
- District: Náchod
- First mentioned: 1497

Area
  - Total: 11.34 km^{2} (4.38 sq mi)
- Elevation: 264 m (866 ft)

Population (2026-01-01)
  - Total: 728
  - Density: 64.2/km^{2} (166/sq mi)
- Time zone: UTC+1 (CET)
  - Summer (DST): UTC+2 (CEST)
- Postal codes: 552 03, 552 25
- Website: www.rychnovek.cz

Rychnovek (German: Reichenhof) is a municipality and village in Náchod District in the Hradec Králové Region of the Czech Republic. It has about 700 inhabitants.

== Administrative division ==
Rychnovek consists of three municipal parts (in brackets population according to the 2021 census):

- Rychnovek (303)
- Doubravice u České Skalice (70)
- Zvole (239)

== Demographics ==
Historical population
Year	Pop.	±%
1869	890	—
1880	942	+5.8%
1890	998	+5.9%
1900	1,037	+3.9%
1910	1,025	−1.2%
1921	968	−5.6%
1930	860	−11.2%
1950	700	−18.6%
1961	737	+5.3%
1970	680	−7.7%
1980	641	−5.7%
1991	564	−12.0%
2001	586	+3.9%
2011	584	−0.3%
2021	612	+4.8%
Source: Censuses
