= Staňkovice (Litoměřice District) =

- Municipality
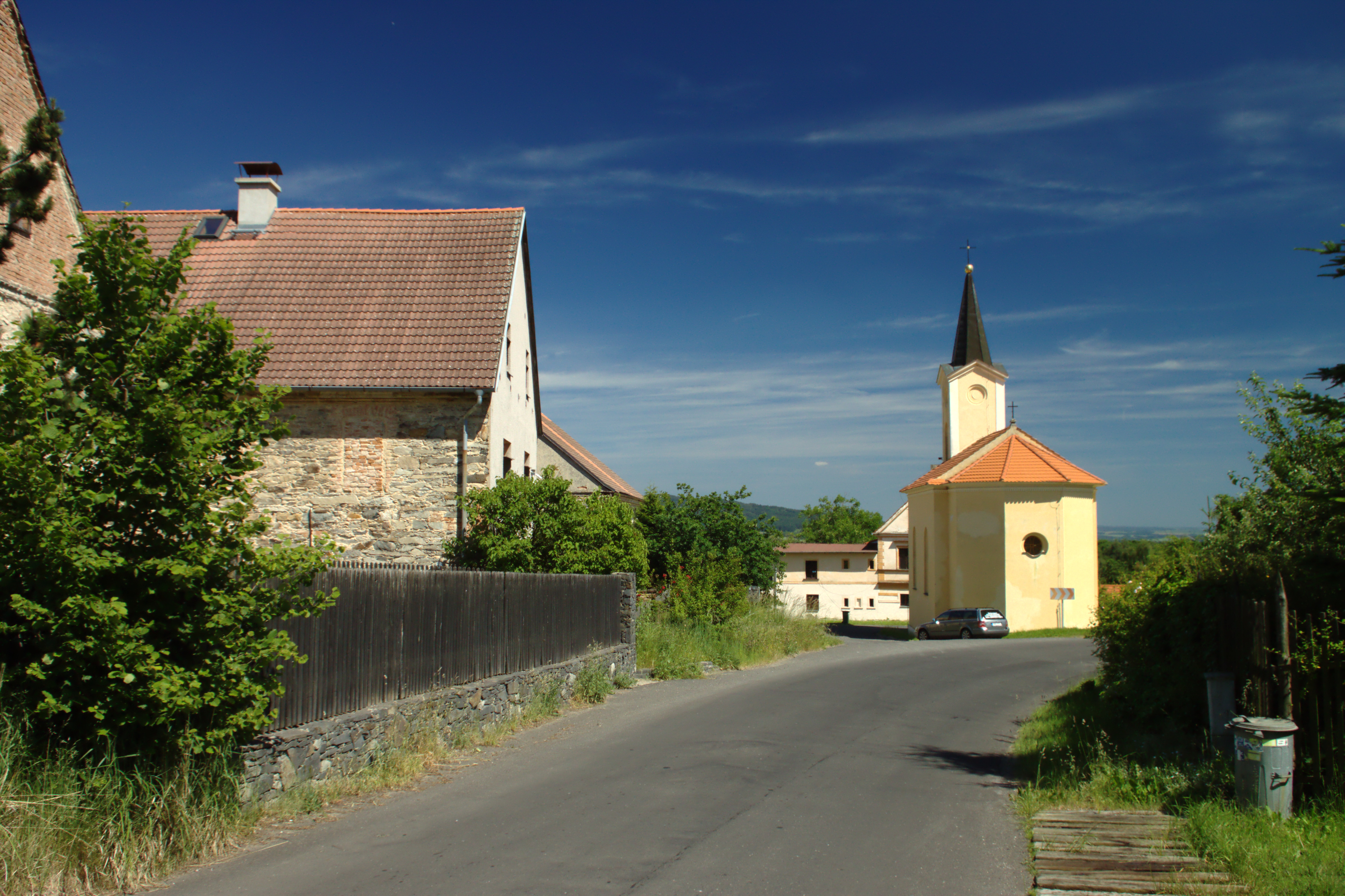
- Chapel of Saint Procopius

- Flag Coat of arms

- Location in the Czech Republic
- Coordinates: 50°35′22″N 14°10′2″E
- Country: Czech Republic
- Region: Ústí nad Labem
- District: Litoměřice
- First mentioned: 1255

Area
  - Total: 2.59 km^{2} (1.00 sq mi)
- Elevation: 388 m (1,273 ft)

Population (2026-01-01)
  - Total: 35
  - Density: 14/km^{2} (35/sq mi)
- Time zone: UTC+1 (CET)
  - Summer (DST): UTC+2 (CEST)
- Postal code: 412 01
- Website: www.oustankovice.cz

Staňkovice (German: Stankowitz) is a municipality and village in Litoměřice District in the Ústí nad Labem Region of the Czech Republic. It has about 40 inhabitants.

Staňkovice lies approximately 8 kilometres (5 mi) north-east of Litoměřice, 12 km (7 mi) south-east of Ústí nad Labem, and 59 km (37 mi) north of Prague.

== Demographics ==
Historical population
Year	Pop.	±%
1869	234	—
1880	229	−2.1%
1890	220	−3.9%
1900	224	+1.8%
1910	219	−2.2%
1921	196	−10.5%
1930	184	−6.1%
1950	115	−37.5%
1961	91	−20.9%
1970	82	−9.9%
1980	56	−31.7%
1991	30	−46.4%
2001	32	+6.7%
2011	44	+37.5%
2021	28	−36.4%
Source: Censuses
