= Doubravice (Strakonice District) =

- Municipality
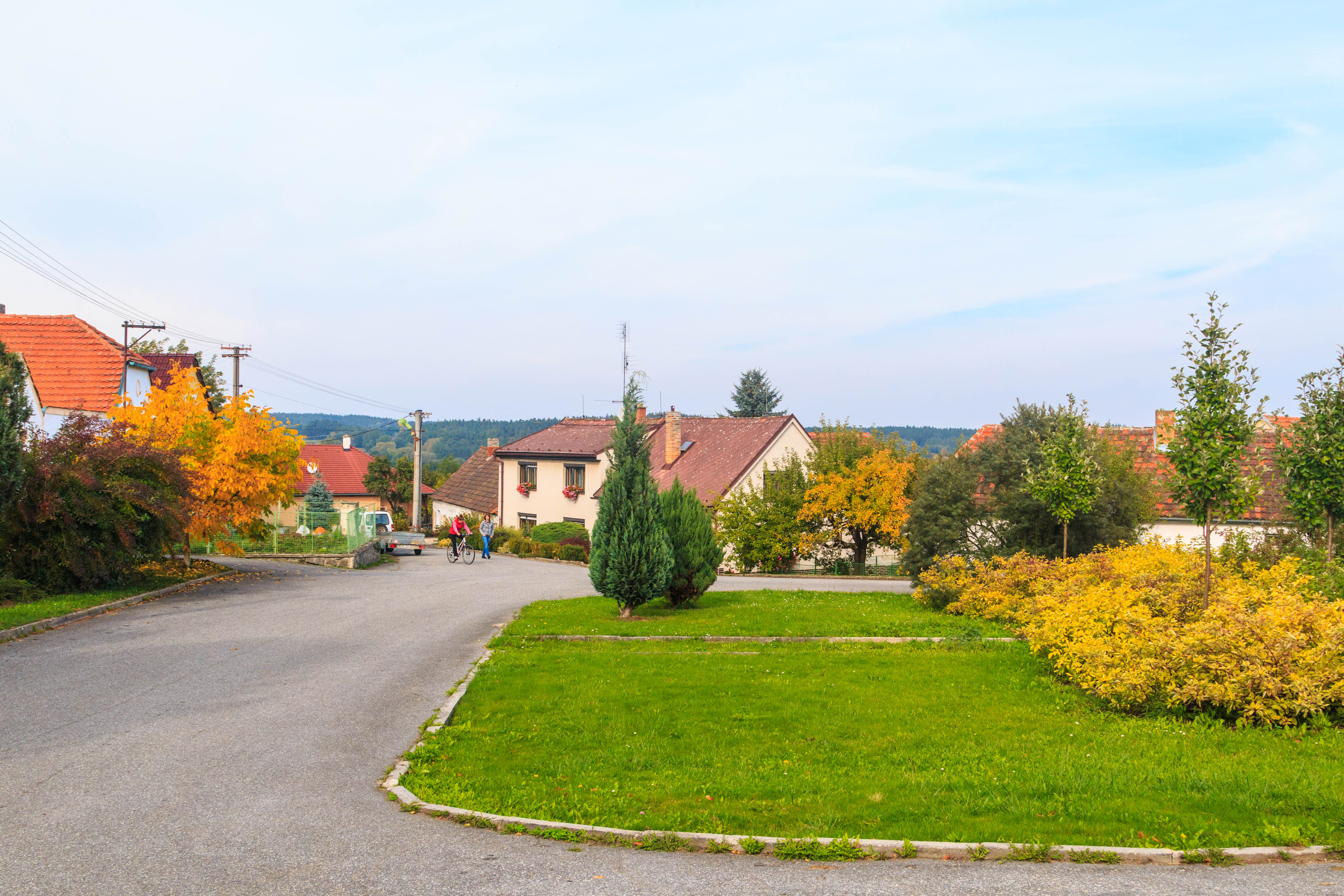
- Centre of Doubravice

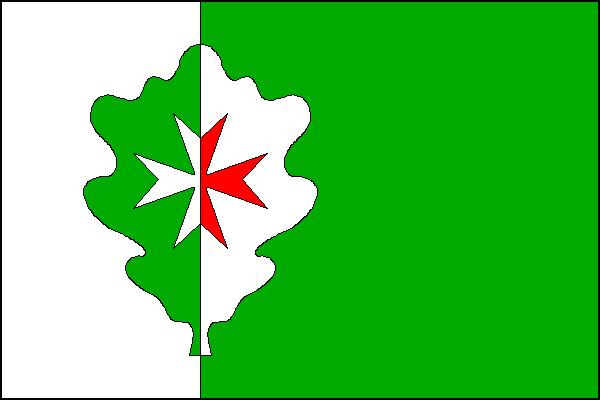
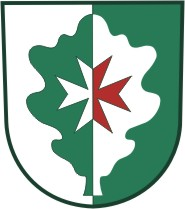
- Flag Coat of arms

- Location in the Czech Republic
- Coordinates: 49°21′8″N 13°51′43″E
- Country: Czech Republic
- Region: South Bohemian
- District: Strakonice
- First mentioned: 1357

Area
  - Total: 7.45 km^{2} (2.88 sq mi)
- Elevation: 531 m (1,742 ft)

Population (2026-01-01)
  - Total: 251
  - Density: 33.7/km^{2} (87.3/sq mi)
- Time zone: UTC+1 (CET)
  - Summer (DST): UTC+2 (CEST)
- Postal code: 387 35
- Website: www.doubravice.eu

Doubravice is a municipality and village in Strakonice District in the South Bohemian Region of the Czech Republic. It has about 300 inhabitants.

Doubravice lies approximately 11 kilometres (7 mi) north of Strakonice, 62 km (39 mi) north-west of České Budějovice, and 91 km (57 mi) south-west of Prague.

== Administrative division ==
Doubravice consists of two municipal parts (in brackets population according to the 2021 census):

- Doubravice (206)
- Nahošín (55)

== Demographics ==
Historical population
Year	Pop.	±%
1869	478	—
1880	550	+15.1%
1890	528	−4.0%
1900	510	−3.4%
1910	518	+1.6%
1921	507	−2.1%
1930	460	−9.3%
1950	340	−26.1%
1961	362	+6.5%
1970	337	−6.9%
1980	294	−12.8%
1991	268	−8.8%
2001	249	−7.1%
2011	249	+0.0%
2021	261	+4.8%
Source: Censuses
