= Úpohlavy =

- Municipality
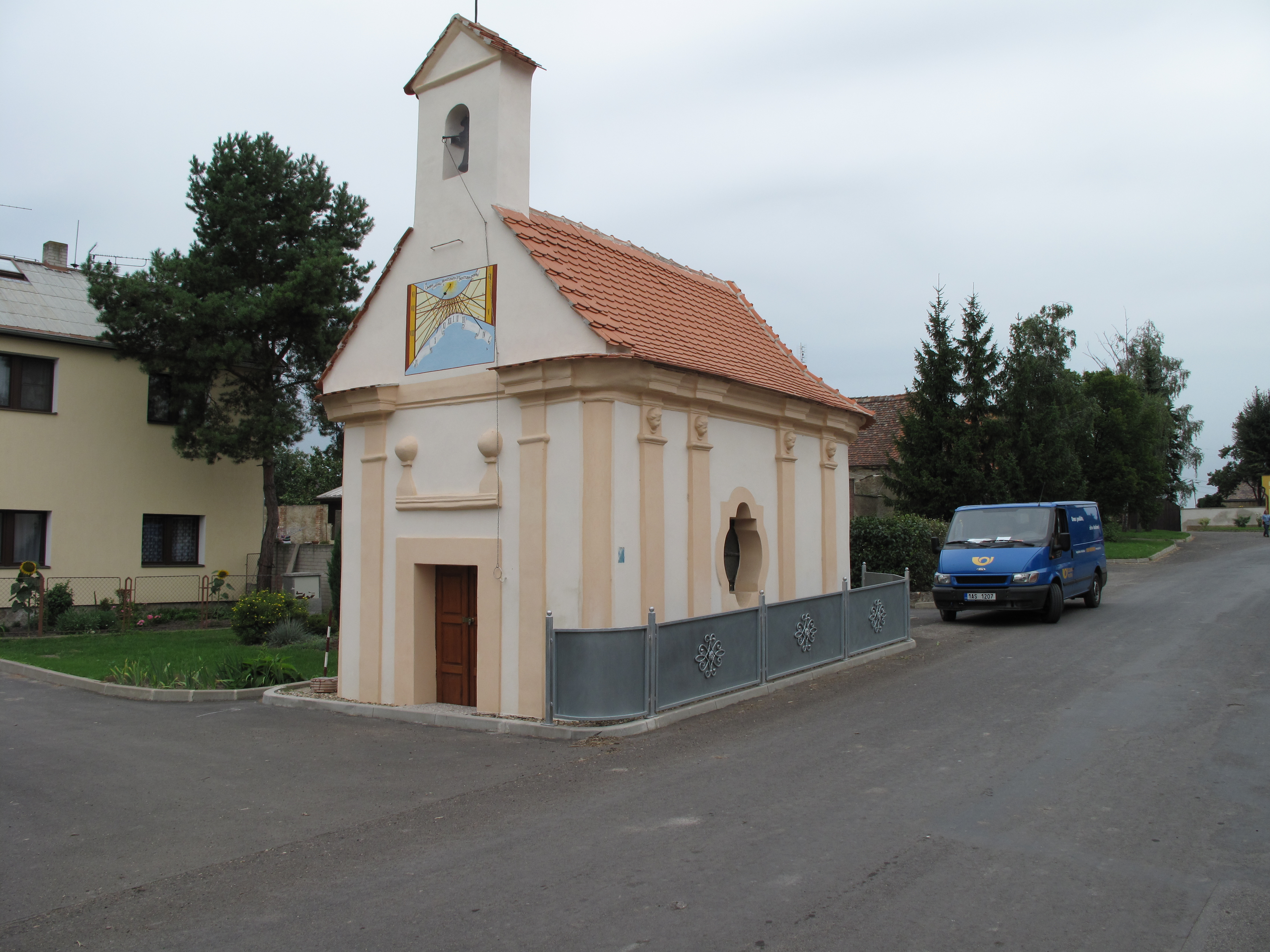
- Chapel of the Holy Trinity

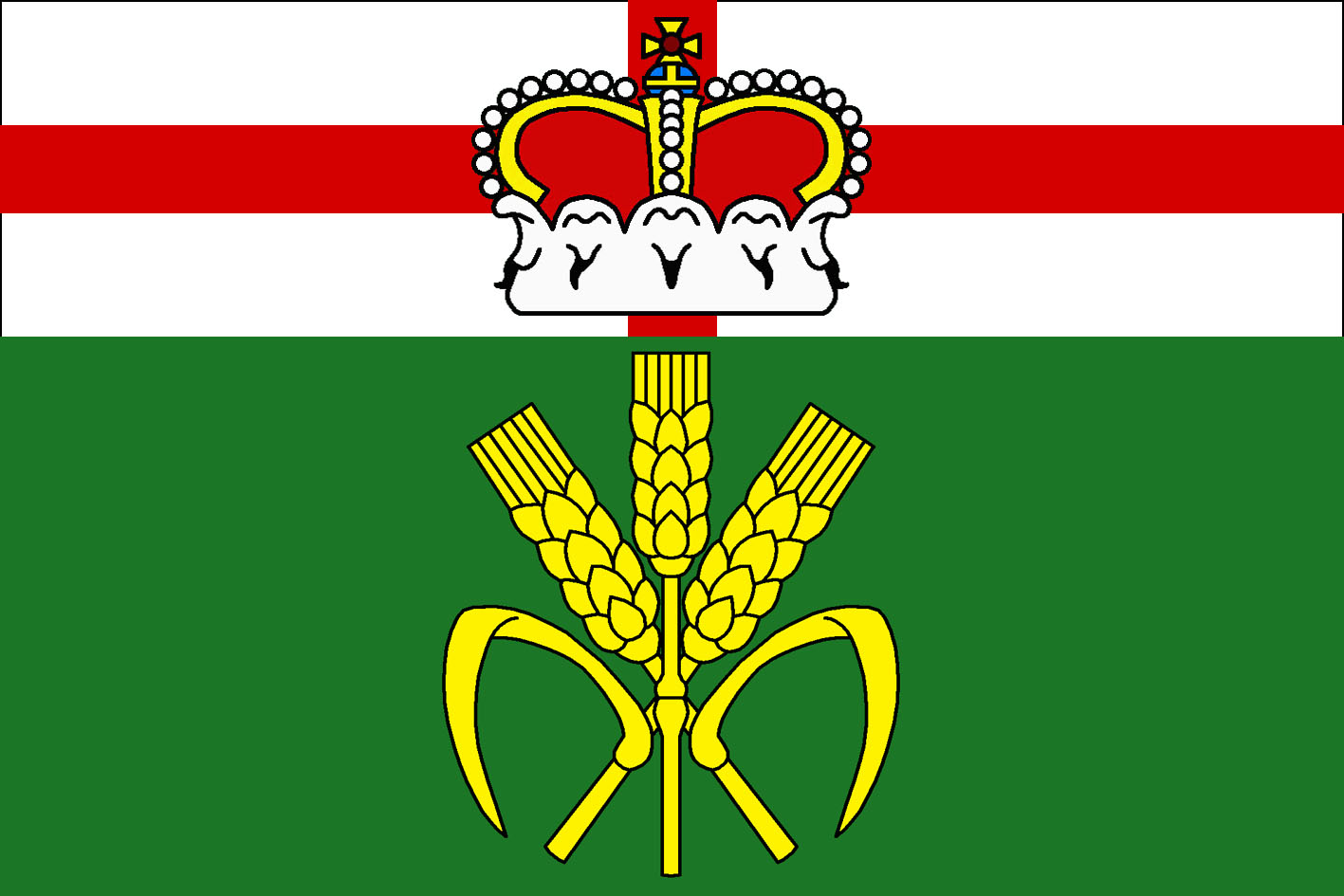
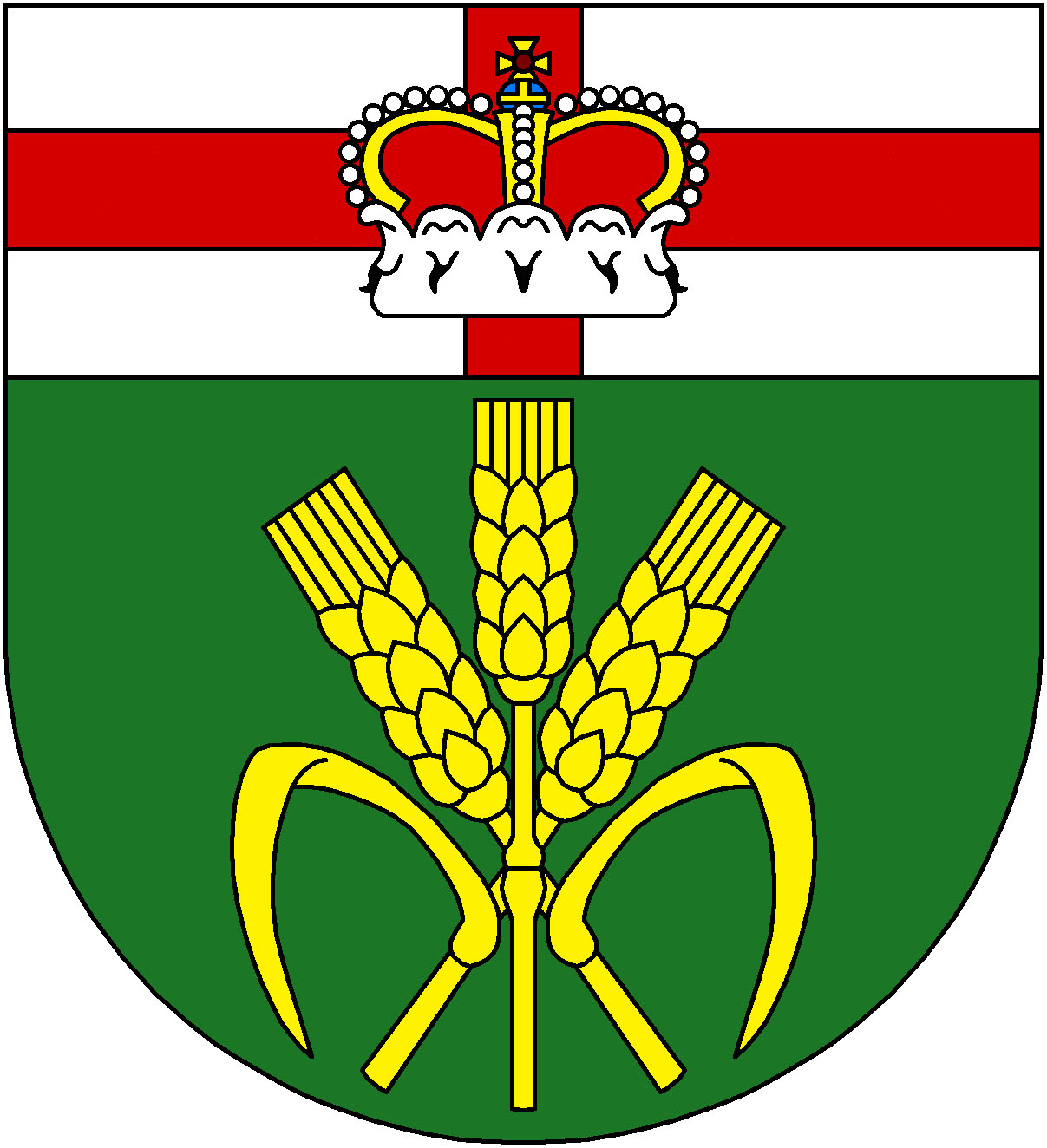
- Flag Coat of arms

- Location in the Czech Republic
- Coordinates: 50°27′47″N 14°2′8″E
- Country: Czech Republic
- Region: Ústí nad Labem
- District: Litoměřice
- First mentioned: 1227

Area
  - Total: 3.97 km^{2} (1.53 sq mi)
- Elevation: 175 m (574 ft)

Population (2026-01-01)
  - Total: 282
  - Density: 71.0/km^{2} (184/sq mi)
- Time zone: UTC+1 (CET)
  - Summer (DST): UTC+2 (CEST)
- Postal code: 410 02
- Website: www.upohlavy.cz

Úpohlavy is a municipality and village in Litoměřice District in the Ústí nad Labem Region of the Czech Republic. It has about 300 inhabitants.

Úpohlavy lies approximately 11 kilometres (7 mi) south-west of Litoměřice, 23 km (14 mi) south of Ústí nad Labem, and 50 km (31 mi) north-west of Prague.

== Demographics ==
Historical population
Year	Pop.	±%
1869	266	—
1880	276	+3.8%
1890	325	+17.8%
1900	351	+8.0%
1910	421	+19.9%
1921	366	−13.1%
1930	406	+10.9%
1950	316	−22.2%
1961	315	−0.3%
1970	268	−14.9%
1980	225	−16.0%
1991	207	−8.0%
2001	233	+12.6%
2011	252	+8.2%
2021	272	+7.9%
Source: Censuses
