= Býčkovice =

- Municipality
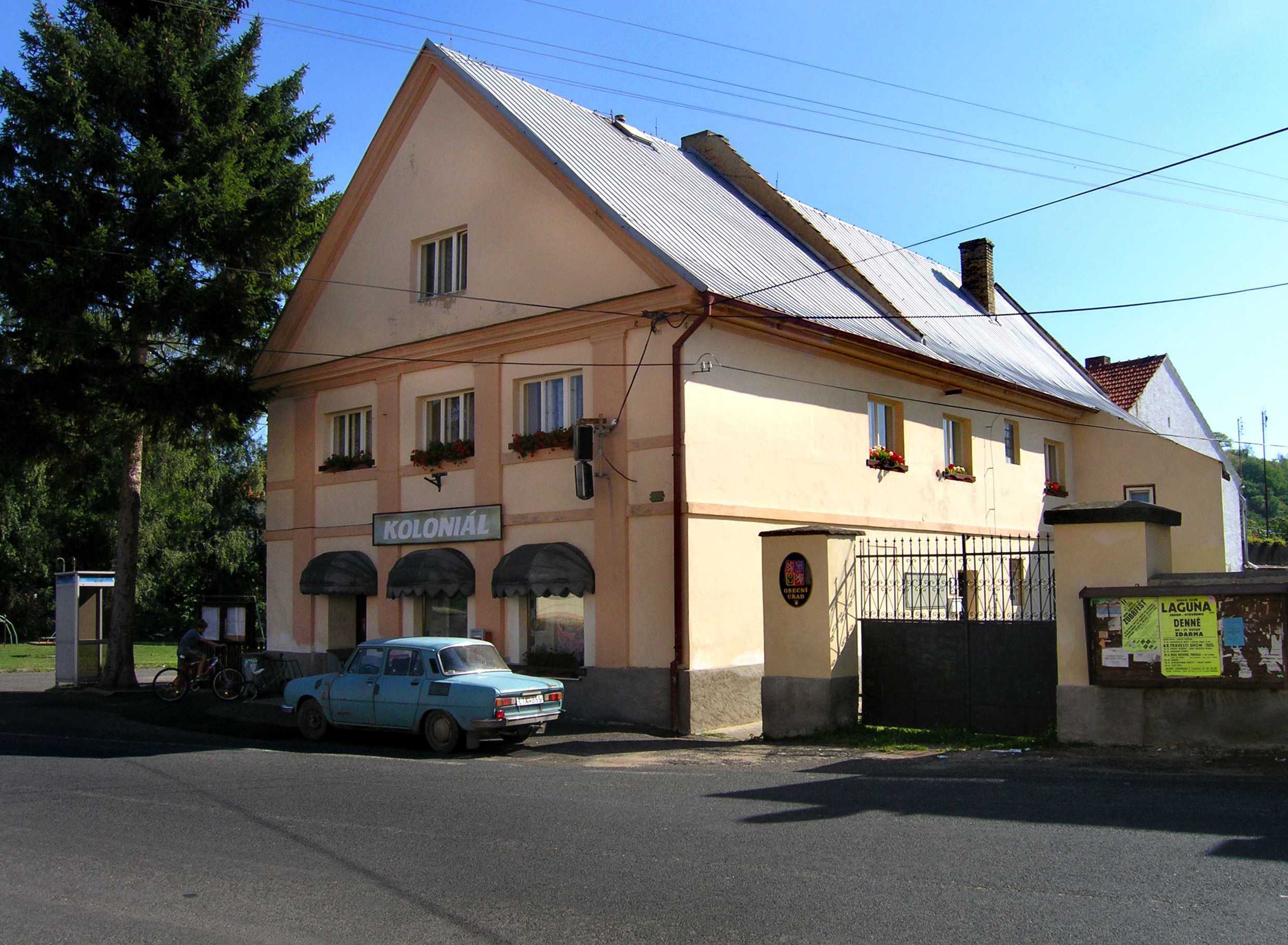
- Municipal office

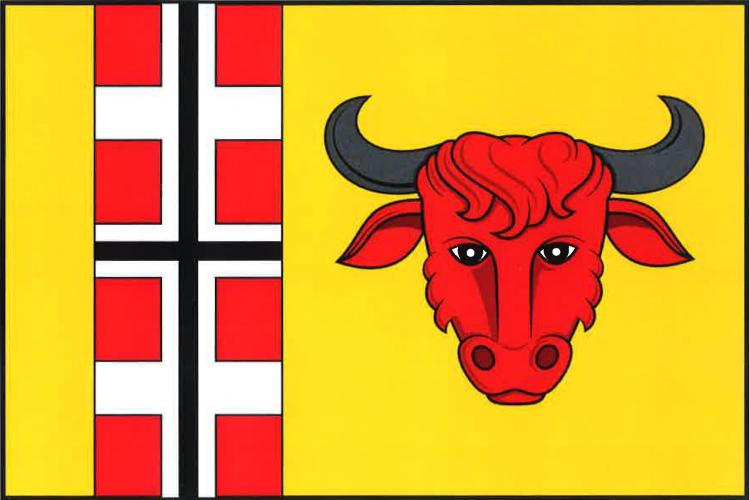
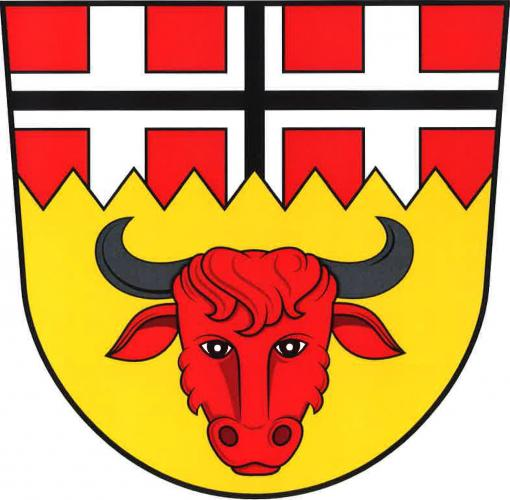
- Flag Coat of arms

- Location in the Czech Republic
- Coordinates: 50°33′35″N 14°12′49″E
- Country: Czech Republic
- Region: Ústí nad Labem
- District: Litoměřice
- First mentioned: 1197

Area
  - Total: 5.52 km^{2} (2.13 sq mi)
- Elevation: 203 m (666 ft)

Population (2026-01-01)
  - Total: 288
  - Density: 52.2/km^{2} (135/sq mi)
- Time zone: UTC+1 (CET)
  - Summer (DST): UTC+2 (CEST)
- Postal code: 412 01
- Website: www.byckovice.cz

Býčkovice (German: Pitschkowitz) is a municipality and village in Litoměřice District in the Ústí nad Labem Region of the Czech Republic. It has about 300 inhabitants.

Býčkovice lies approximately 8 kilometres (5 mi) north-east of Litoměřice, 17 km (11 mi) south-east of Ústí nad Labem, and 55 km (34 mi) north of Prague.

== Administrative division ==
Býčkovice consists of two municipal parts (in brackets population according to the 2021 census):

- Býčkovice (220)
- Velký Újezd (80)

== Demographics ==
Historical population
| Year | Pop. | ±% |
|---|---|---|
| 1869 | 697 | — |
| 1880 | 733 | +5.2% |
| 1890 | 652 | −11.1% |
| 1900 | 655 | +0.5% |
| 1910 | 648 | −1.1% |
| 1921 | 620 | −4.3% |
| 1930 | 664 | +7.1% |
| 1950 | 413 | −37.8% |
| 1961 | 436 | +5.6% |
| 1970 | 372 | −14.7% |
| 1980 | 303 | −18.5% |
| 1991 | 257 | −15.2% |
| 2001 | 282 | +9.7% |
| 2011 | 293 | +3.9% |
| 2021 | 300 | +2.4% |
Source: Censuses
