= Račiněves =

- Municipality
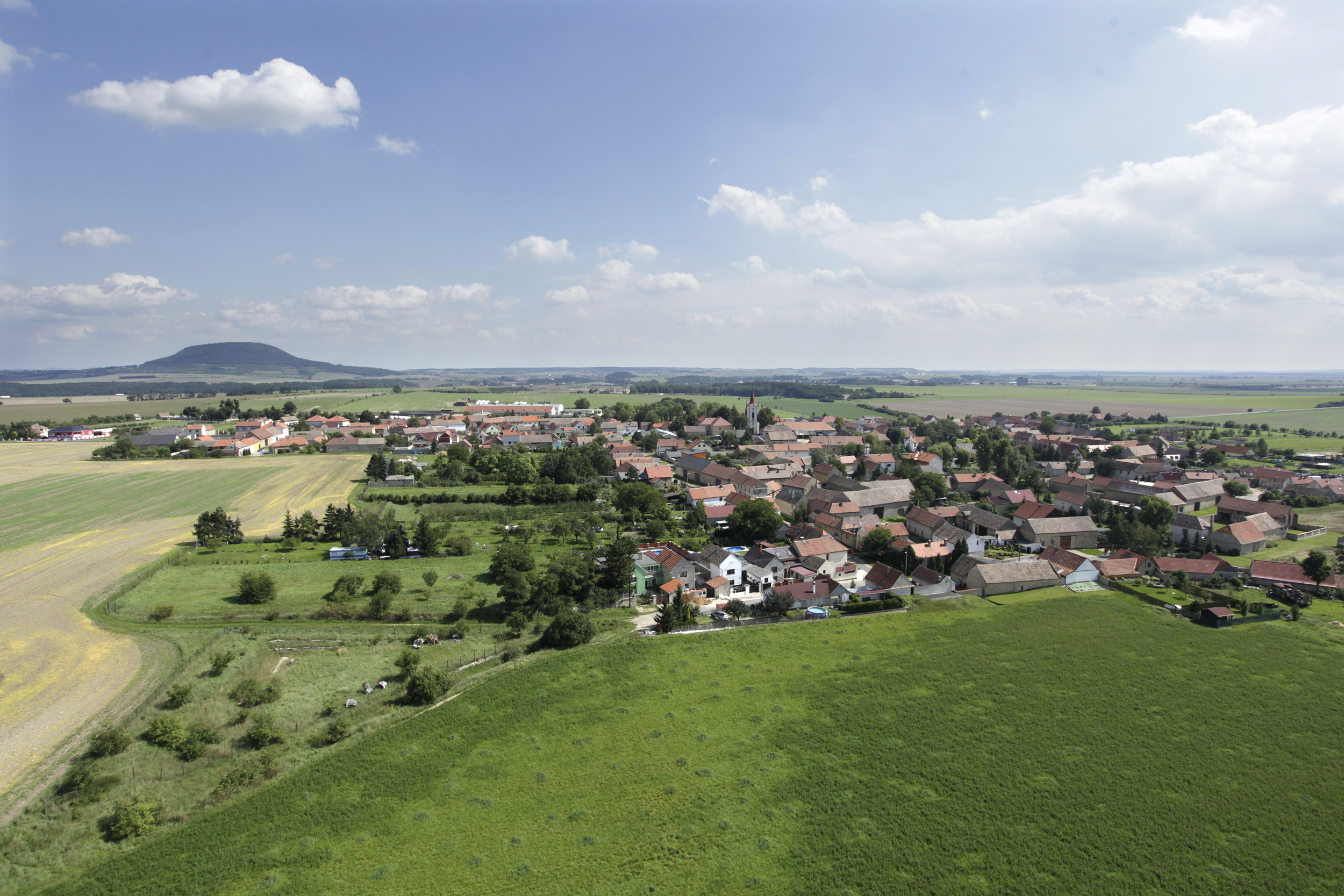
- Aerial view

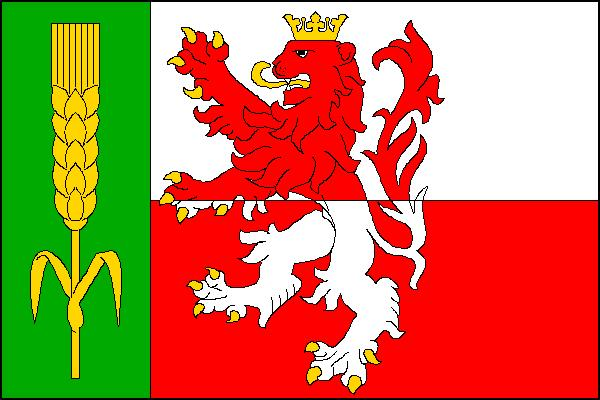
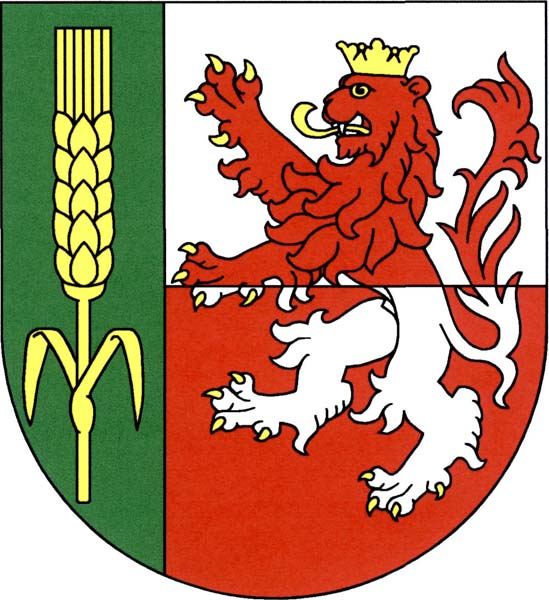
- Flag Coat of arms

- Location in the Czech Republic
- Coordinates: 50°22′23″N 14°13′7″E
- Country: Czech Republic
- Region: Ústí nad Labem
- District: Litoměřice
- First mentioned: 1262

Area
  - Total: 11.14 km^{2} (4.30 sq mi)
- Elevation: 227 m (745 ft)

Population (2026-01-01)
  - Total: 623
  - Density: 55.9/km^{2} (145/sq mi)
- Time zone: UTC+1 (CET)
  - Summer (DST): UTC+2 (CEST)
- Postal code: 413 01
- Website: www.racineves.cz

Račiněves is a municipality and village in Litoměřice District in the Ústí nad Labem Region of the Czech Republic. It has about 600 inhabitants.

Račiněves lies approximately 19 kilometres (12 mi) south of Litoměřice, 34 km (21 mi) south of Ústí nad Labem, and 36 km (22 mi) north-west of Prague.

== Demographics ==
Historical population
Year	Pop.	±%
1869	773	—
1880	791	+2.3%
1890	777	−1.8%
1900	778	+0.1%
1910	841	+8.1%
1921	840	−0.1%
1930	828	−1.4%
1950	583	−29.6%
1961	609	+4.5%
1970	592	−2.8%
1980	476	−19.6%
1991	435	−8.6%
2001	446	+2.5%
2011	544	+22.0%
2021	601	+10.5%
Source: Censuses

== Archaeology ==
Račiněves is home to an important archaeological site, at which numerous stone tools dating to the Lower Palaeolithic were found.
