= Jenčice =

- Municipality
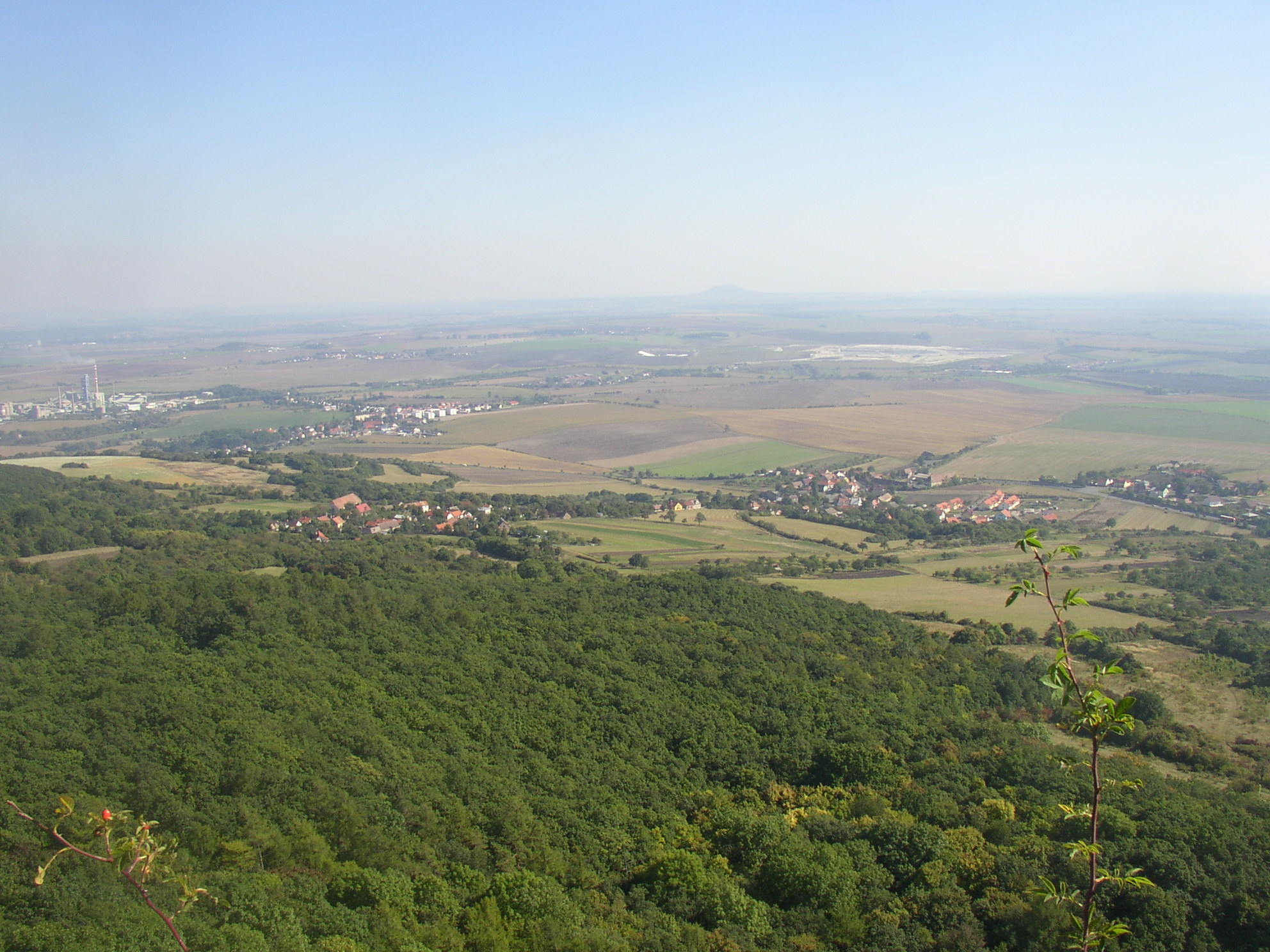
- View from the northwest

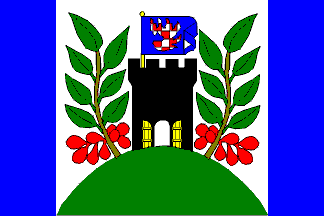
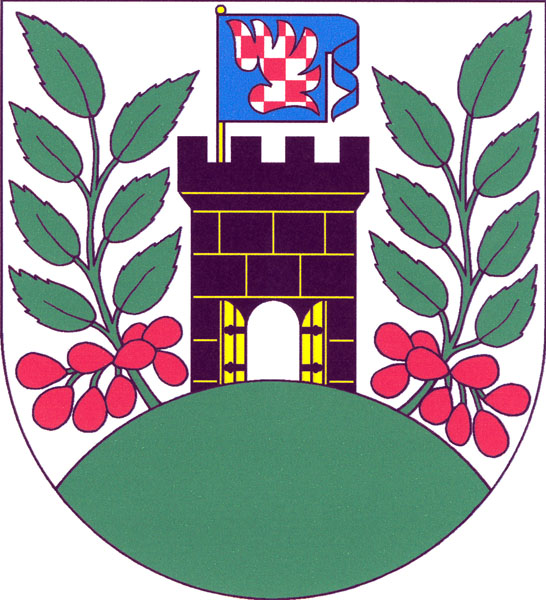
- Flag Coat of arms

- Location in the Czech Republic
- Coordinates: 50°28′59″N 14°0′16″E
- Country: Czech Republic
- Region: Ústí nad Labem
- District: Litoměřice
- First mentioned: 1318

Area
  - Total: 6.35 km^{2} (2.45 sq mi)
- Elevation: 227 m (745 ft)

Population (2026-01-01)
  - Total: 347
  - Density: 54.6/km^{2} (142/sq mi)
- Time zone: UTC+1 (CET)
  - Summer (DST): UTC+2 (CEST)
- Postal code: 411 15
- Website: www.jencice.cz

Jenčice is a municipality and village in Litoměřice District in the Ústí nad Labem Region of the Czech Republic. It has about 300 inhabitants.

Jenčice lies approximately 10 kilometres (6 mi) south-west of Litoměřice, 20 km (12 mi) south of Ústí nad Labem, and 54 km (34 mi) north-west of Prague.

== Demographics ==
Historical population
| Year | Pop. | ±% |
|---|---|---|
| 1869 | 459 | — |
| 1880 | 461 | +0.4% |
| 1890 | 449 | −2.6% |
| 1900 | 493 | +9.8% |
| 1910 | 515 | +4.5% |
| 1921 | 517 | +0.4% |
| 1930 | 555 | +7.4% |
| 1950 | 374 | −32.6% |
| 1961 | 375 | +0.3% |
| 1970 | 335 | −10.7% |
| 1980 | 303 | −9.6% |
| 1991 | 252 | −16.8% |
| 2001 | 318 | +26.2% |
| 2011 | 333 | +4.7% |
| 2021 | 313 | −6.0% |
Source: Censuses

== Sights ==
The most important monument of Jenčice is the ruin of the Košťálov Castle, located on the Košťál hill in the northwestern part of the municipal territory. The castle was probably built around 1276 and abandoned in the 16th century.
