= Vilém II of Pernštejn =

Czech hofmeister, marshal, fish farmer and nobleman

- Born: 1438
- Died: 8 April 1521; Pardubice
- Buried: Church of the Holy Cross, Doubravník
- Noble family: Pernštejn
- Spouse: Johanka of Liblice
- Father: Jan II of Pernštejn
- Mother: Bohunka of Lomnice

Vilém II of Pernštejn (German: Wilhelm II. von Pernstein or Wilhelm II. von Bernstein, Czech: Vilém II. z Pernštejna or Vilém z Pernštejna a na Helfštejně; 1438 – 8 April 1521) was a Czech nobleman. He held the office of High Treasurer of Moravia from 1474 to 1487. He was High Marshall of Bohemia from 1483 to 1490 and Lord Chamberlain of Bohemia from 1490 to 1514.

== Youth ==
Vilém was one of the most important members of the Moravian and Bohemian noble family of Pernštejn. His parents were Jan II of Pernštejn and his second wife Bohunka of Lomnice.

Vilém spent his early years at the Viennese court of the two years younger Ladislaus Posthumus, a member of the Habsburg family, to whose entourage he belonged. Together with Ladislaus and his guardian Frederick III and other Bohemian and Moravian nobles, he traveled to Italy in 1451. In 1452 he was in Rome at the wedding of Frederick III with Eleanor of Portugal.

== Rise under the kings George of Poděbrady and Matthias Corvinus ==
Like his father and his older brother Zikmund, Vilém supported the Bohemian King George of Poděbrady. After George's death in 1471, they stood politically on the side of the newly elected king Vladislav II In 1472, they vouched for by George of Poděbrady's son Victor of Münsterberg-Oels, who was to be bought free from being held captive by the Hungarian king Matthias Corvinus for 100000ducats. That same year they received from King Vladislav II more rights over the convents in Oslavany and Tišnov. Vilém and his father were, however, unable to buy the freedom of his brother Sigmund, who was also held captive by Matthias Corvinus since 1470. Matthias Corvinus did not ask a ransom for Sigmund's release; instead he asked Vilém to defect to Matthias's side and support his military plans. Vilém signed an agreement to this effect, in order to obtain the Sigmund's release, on 14 November 1472 in Sopron. The agreement had been drafted by John Filipec, who later became Bishop of Olomouc. He probably agreed to convert to Catholicism at the same timet. Around New Year 1473, Vilém's army occupied the towns of Kolín and Nymburk. In the summer he fought for Corvinus in Austria and Poland, where he was taken prisoner.

Vilém resided in Velké Meziříčí until 1473, and called himself Vilém of Pernštejn and Meziříčí. In 1474 he acquired the Castle and Lordship of Helfštýn. From 1474 until his death, he called himself Vilém of Pernštejn and Helfštejn. After the cease-fire of Breslau of 1474, Corvinus appointed Vilém High Treasurer of Moravia.

Vilém's father died in 1475. His possessions were inherited by Vilém and his brothers Jan (d. 1478 or 1480), Vratislav I (d. 1496) and Jimram (d. 1481 or 1482). As his brothers were still minors, Vilém took up guardianship and overall management of the possessions. Eliška of Boskovice, the widow of his elder brother Sigmund, and her daughters, only inherited money. Vilém acquired extensive estates in Bohemia through his marriage with Johanka of Liblice; he sold these shortly after the wedding. His father's inheritance was divided in 1478, when his brothers Jan and Vratislav came of age. Jan and Vratislav jointly received Pernštejn Castle and some of the surrounding villages. Vilém kept Zubštejn Castle and the remaining villages in the Pernštejn area for himself and his youngest brother Emmeran, who was still a minor. The elder brothers also inherited the debt their father had left behind, for which Vilém had vouched. He had bought, and paid, on behalf of his father, the Lordship of Meziříčí from his father in law, Jan of Lomnice. When Jan died in 1478 (or 1480), Vratislav inherited his share of the inheritance. The youngest brother, Jimram, died in 1481 or 1482 and Vilém inherited his share. The Bohemian-Hungarian war ended in 1479 with the Treaty of Olomouc. In 1480, Vilém campaigned to have the entries in the Moravian Landtafel written in Czech rather than Latin.

In 1482, Vilém's confidant Pertold of Lipá died. In is testament, he had named Vilém as the guardian of his two children. In this capacity, Vilém took up the regency of Lipá's extensive estates around Moravský Krumlov. He moved his residence to Krumlov, which was also closer to the Hungarian royal court in Budapest. Although Vilém had already been married for several years, all his children would be born in Krumlov. Vilém soon arranged marriages for Lípa's children. According to an agreement made in 1484, Barbora Lípa was to marry Wolfgang of Liechtenstein, a son of Christopher of Liechtenstein. Vilém's daughter Bohunka, who was only born in 1485, was to marry Jindřich of Lipá, who was also under Vilém's guardianship. Already in 1483, Vilém had arranged a marriage between Eliška of Kravaře, Lípa's widow, and Peter IV of Rosenberg. As part of the guardianship, Vilém had become High Marshall of the Kingdom of Bohemia, an office held hereditarily by the Lords of Lipá. This brought him info contact with the royal court at Prague, with whom he had not had any contact since 1472.

In 1487, he transferred, with permission of both Kings involved, the office of High Treasurer of Moravia to his younger brother Vratislav.

== Royal assent at Prague under King Vladislaus II ==
After the death of Matthias Corvinus in 1490, King Vladislaus II appointed Vilém II of Pernštejn to his Lord Chamberlain. In the same year, Vladilav pledged him the lands of the Monastery of Třebíč, the Castle and Lordship of Hluboká nad Vltavou and in 1491, Kunětická hora Castle in East Bohemia, and the surrounding villages, which had belonged to the Monastery at Opatovice, which had perished in the Hussite Wars. Vilém expanded the castle generously, however, he nerver resided there.

Presumably in order to round his eastern Bohemian possessions he acquired the Lordship of Pardubice in 1491. He remodeled Pardubice Castle in the late Gothic style and moved in. During his reign, Pardubice experienced an economic boom, encouraged by trade, commerce, agriculture and mining. In 1516 he acquired the East Bohemian Lordship of Nový Bydžov, which he enlarged by the acquisition of other villages. In the East Bohemian villages in his domain, he created more than 200 ponds, where fish farming was practiced. This changed the area into one of Bohemia's most productive farming areas. Since he now held office mainly in Prague, Vienna and Pardubice, his family headquarters at Pernštejn Castle lost its importance.

In 1491, he also acquired the Lordship of Bohdaneč and in 1495 Nové Město na Moravě. In 1496, he handed the Lípa family possessions to his ward Jindřich of Lipá, who had come of age. In the same year, his younger brother Vartislav died without heirs. Vilém inherited Vartislav's share of Pernštejn, but also Prostějov and castle and lordship of Plumlov, which Vartislav had received from his mother-in-law Johanna of Krawarn after his wife Ludmila of Kunštát had died in 1493. This again increased Vilém's East Bohemian possessions considerably. Around this time, he also acquired Rychnov nad Kněžnou and he purchased Častolovice and the lordship of Potštejn with Litice Castle and several villages from Duke Henry the Elder of Münsterberg. In Moravia, he acquired Hranice na Moravě in 1499, Tovačov and Kralice na Hané in 1503, Židlochovice in 1508 and Kunštát in 1520. He also acquired the East Bohemian dominions of Lanškroun and Lanšperk Castle by marrying his two sons Jan IV and Vojtěch I to two daughters from the House of Kostka of Postupice.

Vilém also carried out investments and improvements on the estates he inherited from his father. In Lipník nad Bečvou, he laid out suburbs and expanded the town's fortifications. He also built a waterworks, which functions to this day. In Přerov, he built the upper town on an elliptical outline around the castle. In 1498, he combined the upper and lower town. In 1515, Vilém donated a baptismal font to the Church of St. Bartholomew in Pardubice.

Vilém died on 8 April 1521 in Pardubice, and was buried in the Church of the Holy Cross in Doubravník. This church had been destroyed during the Hussite Wars, but had been rebuilt by Vilém's son Jan IV. His elder son Jan IV inherited his Bohemian estates, while his younger son Vojtěch I received his Moravian possessions. However, their lavish life style forced them to sell parts of their inherited lands.

== Marriage and issue ==
Vilém II of Pernštejn married before 1475 with Johanka of Liblice. They had three children:

1. Bohunka (1485–1549), married
  1. in 1500 Jindřich of Lipá (died: 1515)
  2. Dobeš of Boskovice (d. 1540)
2. Jan IV of Pernštejn (1487–1548), married
  1. in 1507 Anna of Kostka of Postupice
  2. Hedvika of Šelmberk (d. 1535)
  3. Magdalena Székely of Ormozd (d. 1556), widow of the Hungarian magnate Alexei Thurzó of Bethlenfalva
3. Vojtěch I of Pernštejn (1490–1534), married
  1. in 1507 Markéta Kostka of Postupice (d. 1515), the sister of Jan IV's first wife
  2. in 1516 Johanka of Wartenberg (d. 1536)
