= Jan II of Pernštejn =

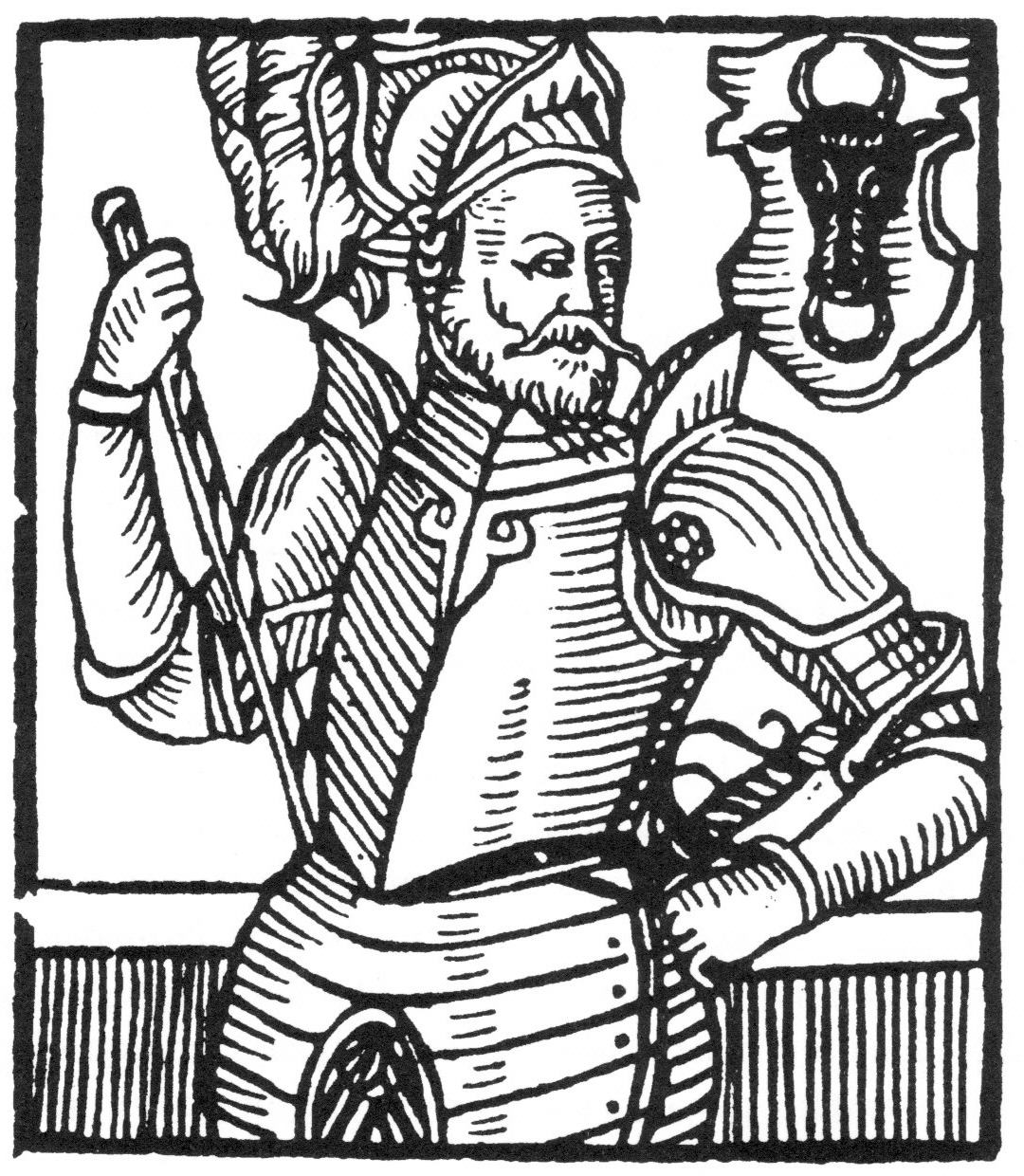
- Jan II of Pernštejn in 1475
- Born: c. 1406
- Died: 28 December 1475
- Noble family: Pernštejn
- Spouses: Barbara of Waldstein; Bohunka of Lomnice; Markéta of Vranov
- Father: Vilém I of Pernštejn
- Mother: either Anežka of Pottenstein or Anežka of Sternberg

Jan II of Pernštejn (Czech: Jan II. z Pernštejna; c. 1406 – 28 December 1475) was a Moravian nobleman and supporter of the Hussites. Later King George of Poděbrady of Bohemia appointed him to Lord Chamberlain of the District Court at Brno and in 1473 by the Anti-King Matthias Corvinus made him one of the four governors of Moravia.

== Life ==
Jan's father, Vilém I of Pernštejn was in the service of the Margrave Jobst of Moravia. Jan later inherited some important state offices from his father. Jan's mother was either Vilém's second wife Anežka Pottenstein or his third wife Anna of Sternberg.

Jan II is first mentioned in a document of 1427, when he and his father sold a piece of land to the abbess of the monastery Doubravník, which had been founded by Štěpán of Medlov, a predecessor of the Pernštejn family. In the same year, his father gave him the right to manage his own assets. In 1429, he participated in the Hussite invasion of the Margraviate of Meissen. Meissen was looted and pillaged.

Prior to 1434, Jan II acquired the lien of Mitrov from Hynek Hlaváč, which he kept at least until 1448, as in that year an entry was made in Landtafel. Between 1434 and 1436, several knight from villages belonging to the Lordship of Pernštejn accused him of occupying their villages illegally. He attempted to settle these feuds. In 1437, King Sigismund of Bohemia died. Sigismund's son-in-law Albert II was a candidate to succeed him. Jan opposed this; he and Hynce Ptáček of Pirkstein supported the candidacy of Casimir IV Jagiellon, the almost eleven-year-old son of King Władysław III of Poland. Nevertheless, Albert II was elected King of Bohemia.

Probably around 1441, Jan II married his second wife, Bohunka of Lomnice. Her father, Jan of Lomnice, transferred the liens on the margraviate fiefs Zubštejn, Pyšolec and Bystřice to Jan II. In 1446, King George of Poděbrady made these liens into hereditary possessions of the Pernštejn family. Jan II also acquired the Lordship of Křižanov from the heirs of the late Zikmund of Křižanov. He made claims on lands in Tišnov which had belonged to the Porta coeli Convent before it was destroyed during the Hussite Wars. In the years 1463, 1467, 1469 and 1470, King George authorized Jan II and his sons Zikmund, Vilém, Jan and Vratislav the use of the usufruct of these lands.

In 1462, Jan II purchased the Lordship of Jimramov from Jan of Cimburk and Tovačovský and his wife Sofie of Kunštát. He was able to significantly expand his property through acquisitions and liens.

King George of Poděbrady appointed Jan II in 1460 to Lord Chamberlain of the District Court at Brno. Jan II was an expert on Moravian law. Jan II always remained loyal to King George. After George's death in 1471, however, he switched sides and supported the counter-King Matthias Corvinus. Jan II was one of the four governors of Moravia Matthias appointed in 1473. Around this time Jan's second-born son Vilém II of Pernštejn came into the foreground more often. When Vilém II acquired the Lordship of Helfštýn, Jan II acted as a witness.

When Jan died in 1475, he left his sons and his young widow extensive properties. At his request he was buried in the monastery church of Doubravník. His widow remarried in 1480 with Markvart of Lomnice and after Markvart's death in 1482, with Berthold of Tworkau.

A bible manuscript from the year 1471 in the National Library in Prague is richly decorated with illuminations and contains the coat of arms of Jan II of Pernštejn, suggesting that it was commissioned by him. It is therefore referred to as the "Pernštejn Bible".

== Marriage and issue ==
Jan II of Pernštejn was married three times. His first marriage was with Barbora Brtnická of Waldstein. They had two children:

- Zikmund of Pernštejn (born: c. 1437; died: 1473 or later), a supporter of King George of Poděbrady
- Kateřina (born: c. 1437; died: 1449)

After Barbara's death (before 1445), Jan married Bohunka of Lomnitz (Bohunka Mezeřícká z Lomnice), who died in 1475. They had the following children:

- Vilém II (1438–1521), High Treasurer of Moravia and later High Marshall of Bohemia
- Jan (c. 1460-1480)
- Vratislav I († 1496), High Treasurer of Moravia, married in 1488 with Ludmila (d. 1493), daughter of Jan Heralt of Kunštát

Before 1475 Jan married his third wife: Markéta of Vranov. His youngest son was born in this marriage:

- Jimram (born: c. 1465; died: 1481 or 1482)
