= Zikmund of Pernštejn =

Sigmund of Pernstein
- Born: c. 1437
- Died: 1473 or later
- Noble family: Pernštejn
- Spouses: Eliška; Eliška of Boskovice
- Father: Jan II of Pernštejn
- Mother: Barbora of Waldstein

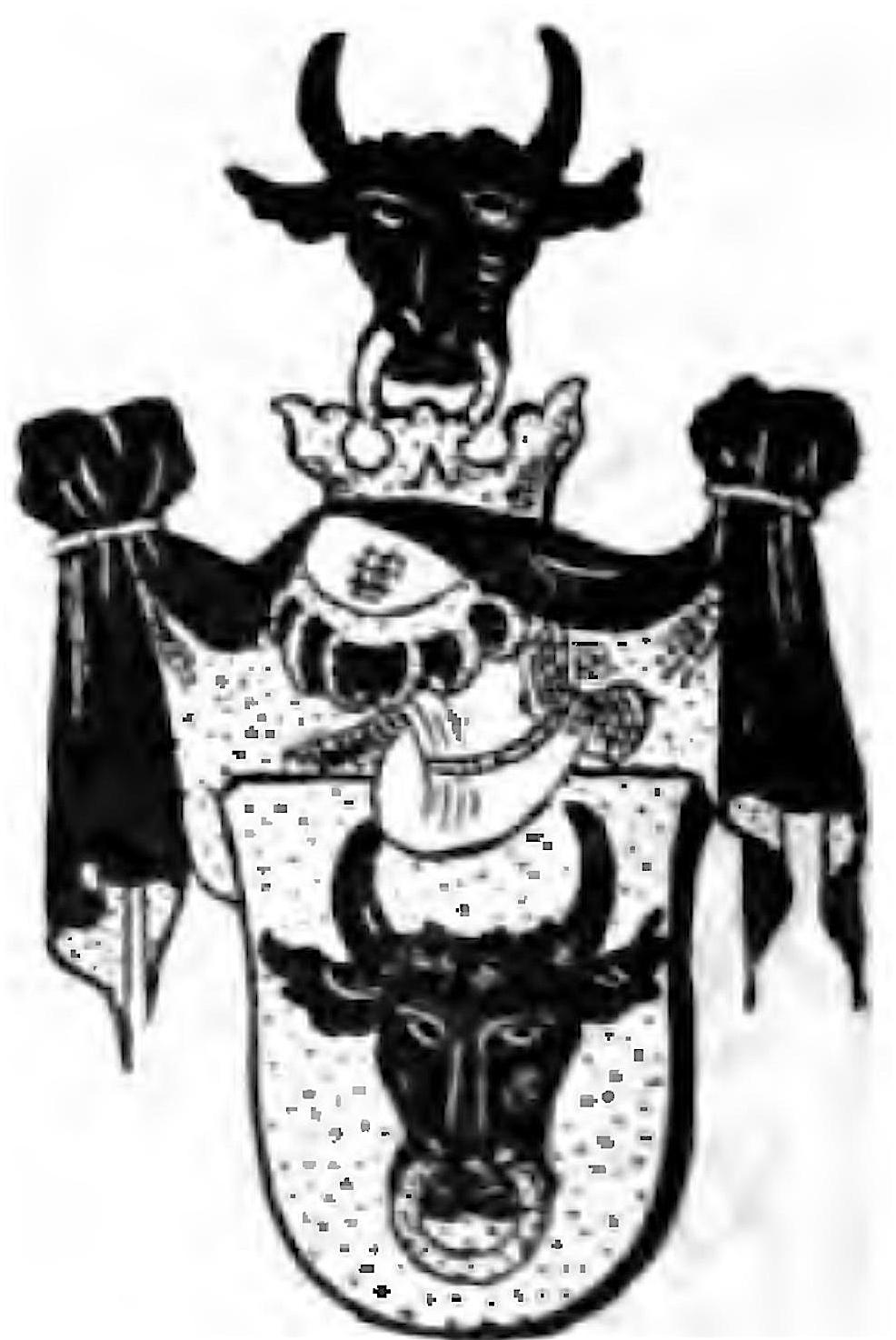
Coat of arms of Pernštejn house

Zikmund of Pernštejn (also spelled Sigmund of Pernstein; c. 1437 – 1473 or later) was a Moravian nobleman. He was a supporter of the Bohemian King George of Poděbrady and was taken prisoner by the anti-king Matthias Corvinus.

== Life ==
Zikmund was a member of the Moravian noble Pernštejn family. His parents were Jan II of Pernštejn and his first wife Barbora of Waldstein.

Like his father and his younger brother Vilém, Zikmund supported the Bohemian King George of Poděbrady. Around the middle 1460s, his father transferred Zubštejn Castle and the associated Lordship to him. In 1467, he was taken prisoner by the Hungarian King Matthias Corvinus, who wanted to gain the crown of Bohemia. He and John of Košumberk were taken to Brno and held there. It is not known when he was released. However, his daughter Dorothea was born in 1470, suggesting that he was released no later than 1469.

In early 1470, he was again taken prisoner. This time, he was held by Zdeněk Konopišťský of Sternberg, the leader of the Zelená Hora Alliance at his residence in Polná. Zikmund father and his brother Vilém tried to achieve Zikmund's release. They failed, however, even after George of Poděbrady died in 1471. They supported the newly elected king Vladislaus II of Bohemia and Hungary, who granted them certain rights over the monastery at Oslavany and the Porta coeli Convent at Tišnov in 1471 and 1472. They provided money for Zikmund's release. Matthias Corvinus, however, demanded that Zikmund change over to his side in the conflict, and probably also that Zikmund convert to Catholicism. Corvinus's advisor, the later bishop John Filipec, was committed to negotiating Zikmund's release. On 14 November 1472 in Sopron, Vilém signed an agreement, under which Zikmund should be released not later than 2 February 1473.

Zikmund's health was probably undermined by his captivity and he did not enjoy his regained freedom for long. He died in 1473 or later. His widow Eliška of Boskovice received Zubštejn Castle as her widow seat. She continued to live there with her young daughters. In 1473, she remarried with Linhart of Guttenstein and Zubštejn fell back to her first father-in-law Jan II of Pernštejn.

== Marriage and issue ==
Zikmund married twice. His first wife was named Eliška; nothing is known about her background. With her, he had a daughter:

- Bohunka (died after 1478)

Zikmund married his second wife in 1437. She was Eliška of Boskovice. With her, he had three more daughters:

- Kunka (c. 1464 – after 1481), married in January 1480 with John Boček Dürrteufel (Suchý Čert), a son of Jan III Dürrteufel of Kunštát
- Dorothea Dorota (c. 1470 – before 1488), married before 1488 with Ctibor of Landštejn
- Machna (c. 1472 – between 1515 and 1520), married in 1488 with Peter the Elder of Zierotin and Šumperk (d. 1530)
