= Jan IV of Pernštejn =

Moravian-Bohemian nobleman

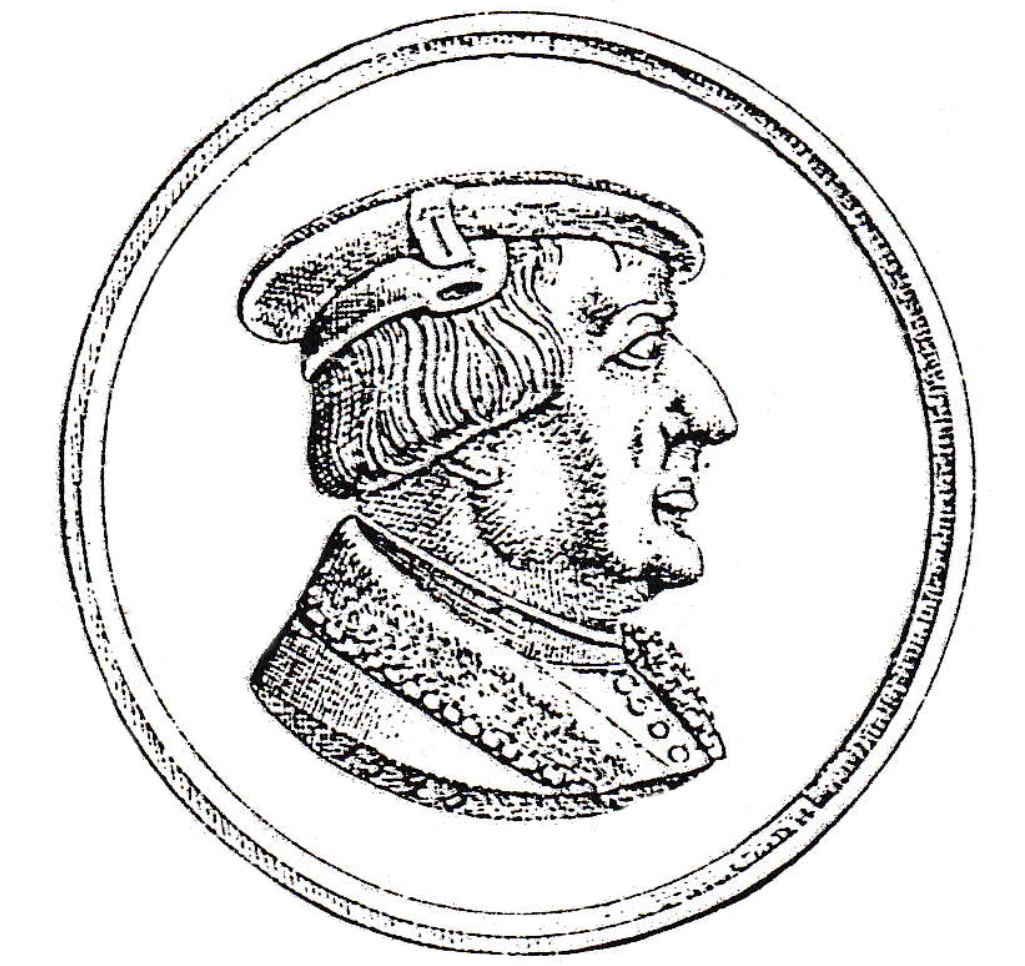
- Appearance of Jan of Pernštejn known only from the relief of his commemorative medal
- Born: 14 November 1487; Moravský Krumlov, Moravia
- Died: 8 September 1548 (aged 60); Hrušovany u Brna, Moravia
- Noble family: Pernštejn
- Spouses: Anna of Postupice; Hedvika of Šelmberk; Magdalena Székely of Ormozd
- Father: Vilém II of Pernštejn
- Mother: Johanka of Liblice

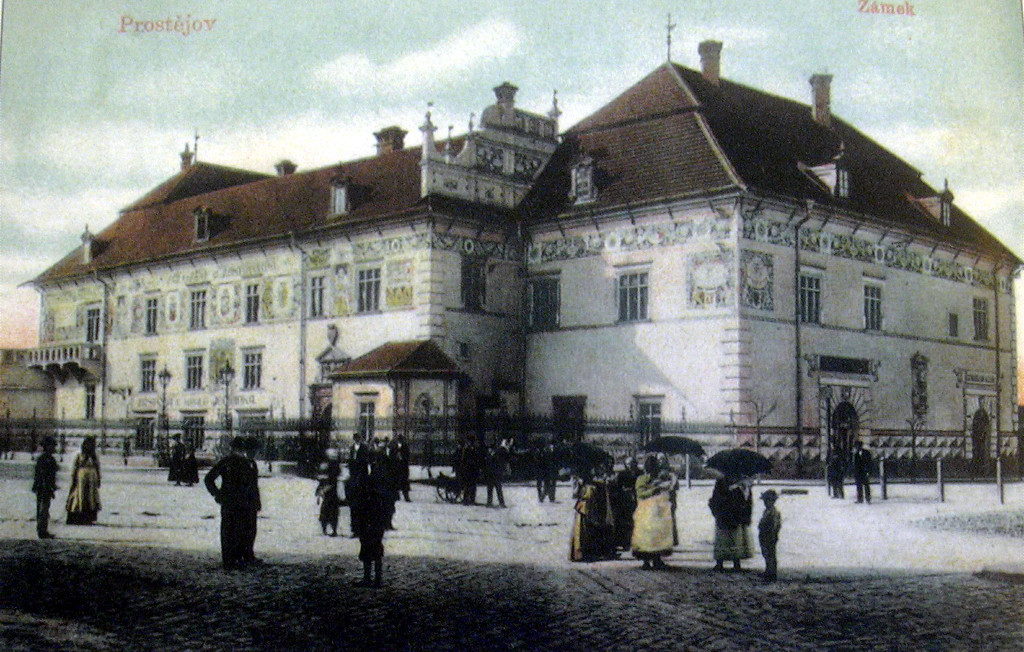
Prostějov Castle

Jan IV of Pernštejn (also known as Jan of Pernstein, John of Pernstein, Jan the Rich or John the Rich in English, Jan z Pernštejna a na Helfštejně or Jan Bohatý in Czech, and Johann IV von Pernstein or Hans von Pernstein auf Helfenstein in German; 14 November 1487 – 8 September 1548) was a Moravian-Bohemian nobleman. He was high treasurer of Moravia in 1506–1516 and Landeshauptmann of Moravia in 1515–1519 and in 1526–1528 and governor of Moravia in 1530–1532. In 1537–1548, he was Count of Kladsko and pledge lord of the County of Kladsko.

== Life ==
Jan of Pernštejn was born on 14 November 1487 in Moravský Krumlov. He was a member of the Moravian noble Pernštejn family. His parents were Vilém II of Pernštejn and Johanka of Liblice. Little is known about Jan's childhood. He probably spent most of it at the family castle at Pardubice; he also stayed some time in Breslau (now Wrocław, Poland). In 1497, Jan and his younger brother Vojtěch I of Pernštejn were knighted at Pardubice Castle by King Vladislav II of Hungary, who was travelling from Prague to Hungary. In 1506, Jan was appointed High Treasurer of Moravia. After 1515, he was Landeshauptmann of Moravia several times. Before 1521, he called himself Jan of Tovačov, after the castle in Tovačov where he and his family lived.

When his father died in 1521, Vojtěch I inherited his father's Bohemian possessions, and Jan inherited the Moravian possessions. From 1521 until his death, he called himself Jan of Helfštejn, after his Moravian castle, even though he spent much of his time at a castle he had built in Prostějov. Shortly after their father's death, both brothers converted to the Utraquist faith.

Jan fought in the Ottoman wars and participated in 1526 with Moravian troops on the Battle of Mohács, where King Louis II of Hungary was killed. When his brother Vojtěch I died in 1534, Jan inherited his extensive Bohemian estates and became one of the richest land owners in Czech countries, leading to his nickname "Jan the Rich".

Jan had a strong sense of art and in 1516 he founded the first literary circle in Moravia, in Třebíč. On his estates, he promoted Renaissance architecture. Between 1522 and 1526, he had a castle built in Prostějov, where he lived with his family. Between 1536 and 1543, he built the Church of Saint Ursula in Chlumec nad Cidlinou. In 1538, he started the construction of a castle in Valašské Meziříčí as well as the reconstruction of the Pardubice castle in Renaissance style. Pernštejn Castle, which his father had neglected, was rebuilt and expanded during Jan's reign and remodeled as a representative palace. From 1540 to 1546, he minted coins in Kłodzko in a Renaissance style. The obverse shows a picture of a bust of Jan, to emphasize the territorial sovereignty of the County of Kladsko.

His views on religion and Bohemian state policy were opposed to those of King Ferdinand I. Where Jan represented the interests of the Estates, Ferdinand tried to limit their power.

Towards the end of his lifetime, Jan the Rich found himself in financial difficulties. In 1543, he had to sell off the Lordship of Riesenburg and a year later, he had to sell the Lordships of Náchod and Lanšperk, as well as parts of the dominion of Potštejn with Litice Castle and Brandys nad Orlici.

Jan died on 8 September 1548 at his castle in Hrušovany u Brna in southern Moravia. He was buried in the Holy Cross Church in Doubravník. This church had been destroyed during the Hussite Wars and Jan had rebuilt it. His territories were divided among his sons. His third wife Magdalena Székely of Ormosd survived him by eight years. The disintegration of his fortune continued after his death, when his son Jaroslav had to sell off the Moravian estates.

== Jan's influence in Silesia ==
After the death of Duke Casimir II of Cieszyn in 1528, Jan took up the guardianship of Casimir's grandson Wenceslaus III Adam, whose father, Wenceslaus II had died in 1524, before Wenceslaus III Adam was born. A treaty to that effect had been concluded before Casimir II's death and they had also decided that Jan's daughter Marie would later marry Wenceslaus III Adam, which she did in 1540. In a secret addendum to this treaty, they had arranged that if ever Casimir's family would die out in the male line, then the Duchy of Teschen would fall to Jan or his descendants.

== Jan as a Count of Kladsko ==
In 1537, King Ferdinand I of Bohemia mortgaged the County of Kladsko, which belonged immediately to Bohemia, to Jan of Pernštejn for 83464guilders. Jan also received the title of Count of Kladsko and the right to mint coins in Kladsko. Since Jan, unlike Ferdinand, sympathized with the Reformation, he supported spread of Lutheranism and Utraquism in territory of Kladsko Land.

Jan settled several disputes between the estates and regulated brewing rights. Although he supported the 1547 Bohemian uprising, the Estates of Kladsko did not participate in the rebellion and consequently, his county was spared when the King punished the rebellious areas.

As early as 1546, two years before Jan's death, his sons were started negotiations with Ernest of Bavaria, the administrator of Salzburg, about the possibility of selling the County of Kladsko to him. After the Estates of Bohemia accepted Ernest as a landed subject, the County of Kladsko was transferred to him on 14 November 1549. A dispute arose when Jan's son Vratislav refused to sell him the Lordship of Hummel, western part of the Kladsko area. This Lordship had been administratively part of Kladsko since 1477, but Vratislav argued it was still a separate Lordship and had been acquired separately by Jan in 1541. When Ernest threatened to call off the whole transaction, Vratislav gave in and handed him Hummel, including the towns of Duszniki Zdrój and Lewin Kłodzki.

== Marriage and issue ==
Jan IV of Pernštejn was married three times. In 1507 he married Anna of Kostka of Postupice, who died in 1526. They had the following children:

- Markéta (1514–1529), married in 1529 Henry II of Münsterberg
- Johanka (1516–?)
- Kateřina (1518-1552?), married in 1533 Jindřich of Švamberk
- Marie (1524–1566), married in 1540 Wenceslaus III Adam of Cieszyn

His second wife was in 1528 Hedvika of Šelmberk, who died in 1535. They had the following children:

- Jaroslav (1528–1560), married in 1552 Elizabeth Thurzó of Bethlenfalvy (d. 1573)
- Vratislav II (1530–1582), married in 1555 Maria Manrique de Lara (d. 1608)
- Vojtěch II of Pernštejn (1532–1561), married in 1556 Kateřina Kostka of Postupice (d. 1564)
- Kateřina (1534–1571), married in 1550 Eck of Salm

John married in 1544 with Magdalena Székely of Ormozd (d. 1556), a widow of the Hungarian magnate Alexei Thurzó of Bethlenfalva. This marriage remained childless.
