= Friedrich von Pernstein =

14th-century Catholic Archbishop of Riga

Friedrich von Pernstein, also referred to as Friedrich von Riga (c. 1270–1340), was Archbishop of Riga from 1304 to 1340. He came from the Pernštejn family of Moravia, and entered the Franciscan Order. In 1304, he was appointed as Archbishop of Riga. Due to an ongoing conflict with the Teutonic Order, who controlled most of the land around Riga, Friedrich von Pernstein only managed to spend less than five of the 37 years he served as archbishop in the city. Instead, much of his life was spent at the Papal Court in Avignon, in a legal struggle against the Teutonic Order. His life in Avignon appears to have been one of ease, and he amassed a substantial library.

== Background and early life ==
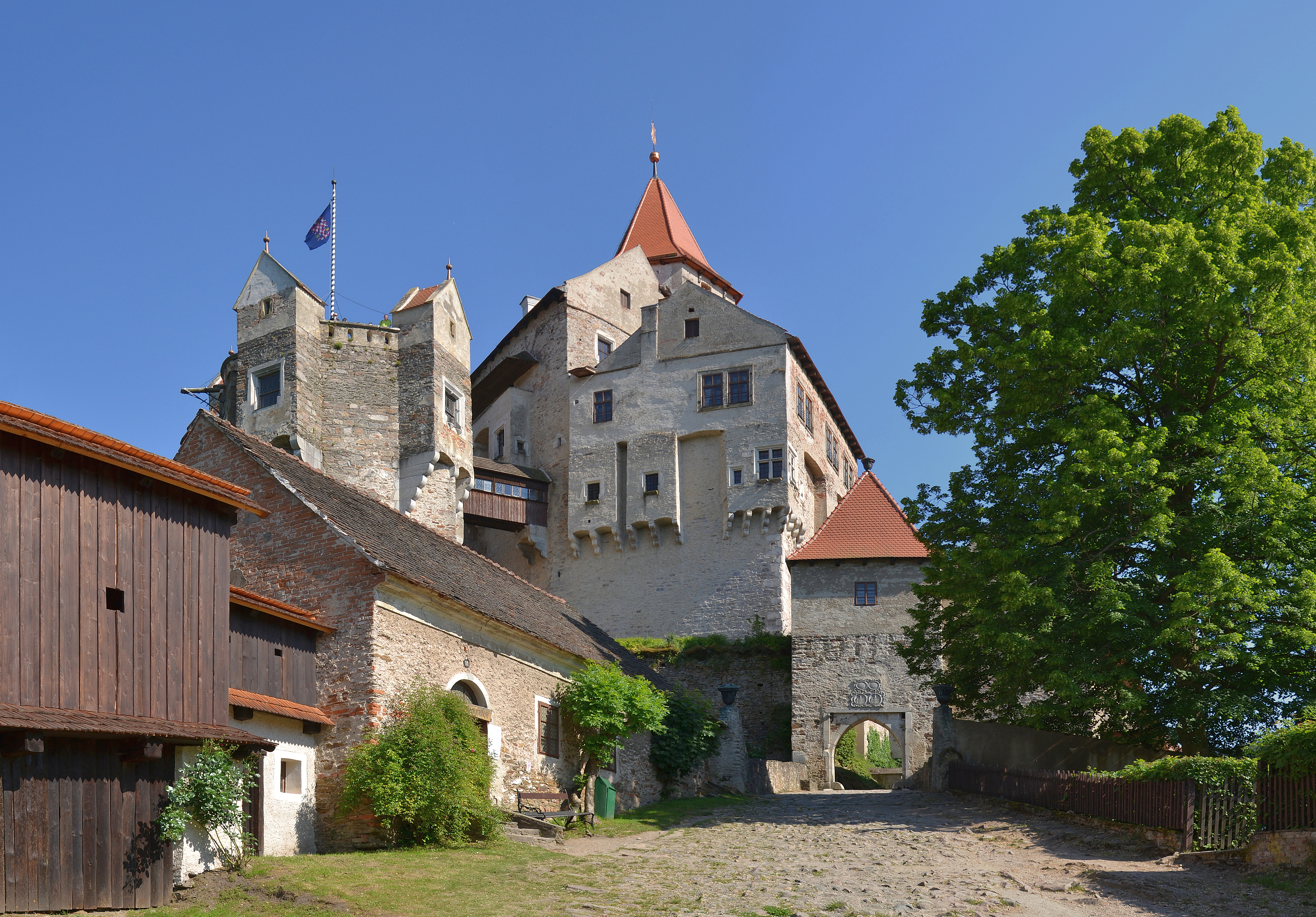
Pernštejn Castle, principal seat of the Pernštejn family

Friedrich von Pernstein was probably born around 1270. He came from the Medlow family, later known as the Pernštejn family after their principal seat, Pernštejn Castle. The family was an old noble family from Moravia in present-day Czech Republic. Friedrich von Pernstein's niece, called Ofka or Euphemia, was abbess of the Franciscan abbey in Doubravník, which the family had founded. His father may also have been named Friedrich, as it is known that another Friedrich von Pernstein died in 1333. He appears to have maintained ties to his homeland throughout his life, and during his long residence in Avignon, he surrounded himself with compatriots from Bohemia.

He was educated, likely in Bologna, and at some point joined the Franciscan Order, rising to become a member of the Apostolic Penitentiary at the Roman Curia during the papacy of Pope Benedict IX. His aristocratic family background was doubtlessly an asset in promoting his career.

== Archbishop of Riga ==
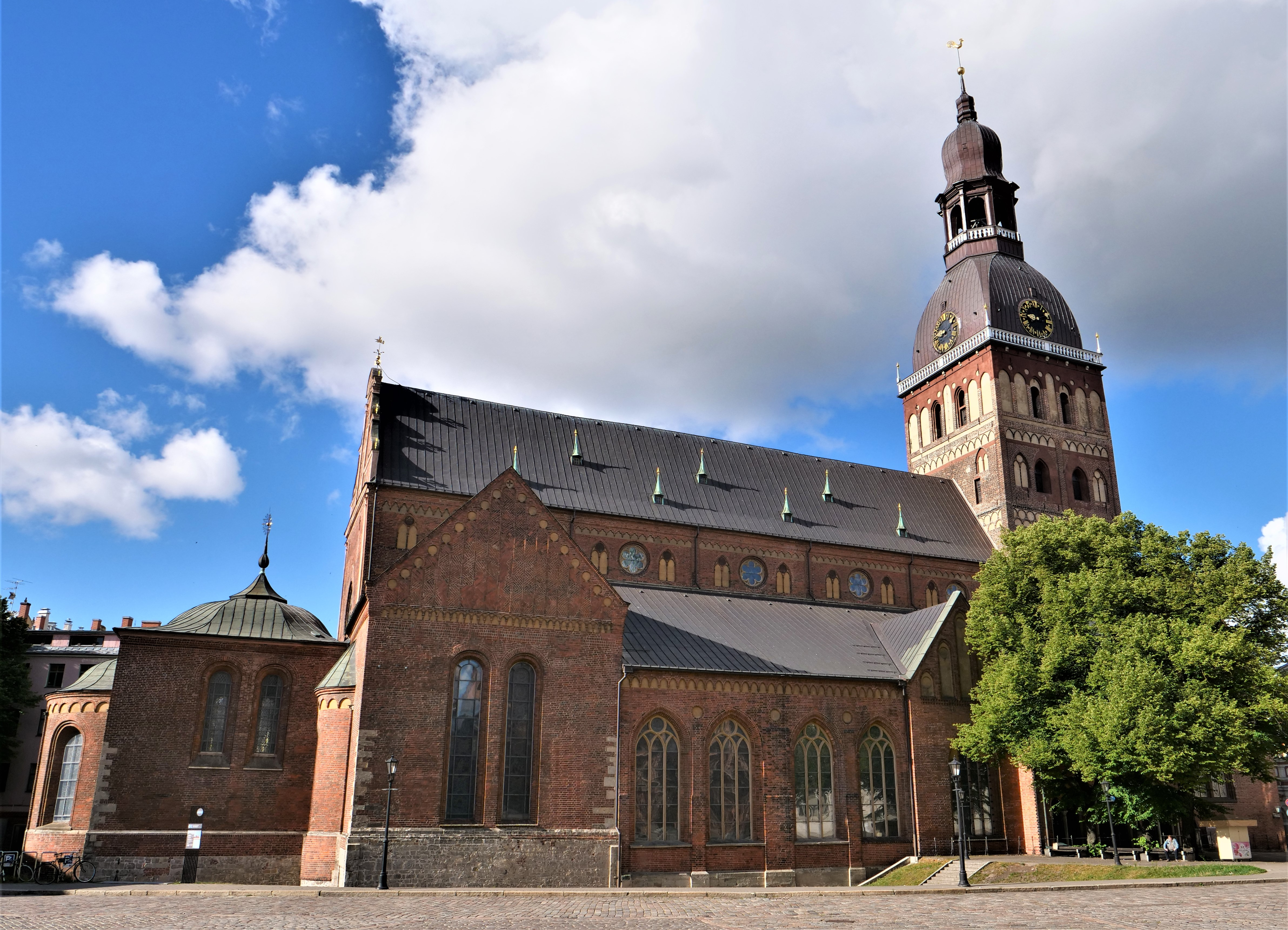
Riga Cathedral as it appears nowadays. Friedrich was Archbishop of Riga but in fact spent little time in the city.

In March 1304, Friedrich von Pernstein was elevated to the rank of Archbishop of Riga. It was not uncommon for high officials in the Curia to be promoted to bishops at the time. The archbishopric of Riga had however almost since its foundation in 1255 come into conflict with the Teutonic Order, who controlled most of the land of the present-day Baltic states and Prussia. The Order vied for control of Riga, seat of the archbishop and at the time an important port city on the eastern shore of the Baltic Sea. The period of strong conflict between the episcopacy and the Teutonic Order from 1297 to 1330 has been described as an outright war. At the time of the appointment of Friedrich von Pernstein, the Teutonic Order was engaged in a systematic policy of taking control over church assets in the area with the ultimate aim of gaining control of Riga, including by constructing a castle, an Ordensburg, at Dünamünde (present-day Daugavgrīva). Daugavgrīva castle was meant to be able to block access to the city via the sea and the river Daugava. Further undermining the position of Friedrich was the fact that upon his accession, the post had been vacant for almost two years.

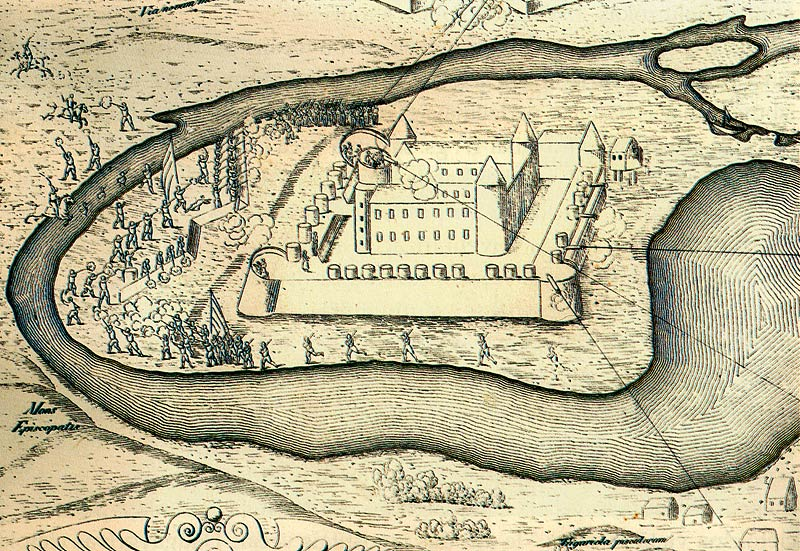
Drawing depicting Daugavgrīva castle in 1601. The construction of the castle was a source of conflict between Friedrich von Pernstein and the Teutonic Order.

Friedrich von Pernstein did what he could to improve his position, including journeying to Venice to meet with the Grand Master of the Teutonic Order Siegfried von Feuchtwangen before going to Riga to take up his post. Upon his arrival, he however immediately came into conflict with the Order over the construction of the castle at Daugavgrīva. This initiated a legal conflict which would last beyond the life span of Friedrich von Pernstein. Among the actions Friedrich von Pernstein undertook to weaken the Order was the attempted conversion of Gediminas, Grand Duke of Lithuania, part of a longer process of the Christianization of Lithuania. While the attempt failed, it led to the expulsion of the Order from Lithuania. During the entire conflict, the citizens of Riga often openly supported Friedrich von Pernstein. While the actions of Friedrich and the trials at the Curia were embarrassing to the Teutonic Order who also suffered occasional setbacks, it ultimately failed to keep the Order from effectively seizing control of Riga: in 1330, the foundation stone was laid to another Order castle just outside the city walls of the city – present-day Riga Castle. In the meantime, the archbishop remained most of the time at the Papal Court (since 1309 located in Avignon), trying to gain support for his cause. While Friedrich von Pernstein was the longest serving Archbishop of Riga with a tenure of 37 years,, he only spent less than five of those years actually in Riga. Neither of the three successors of Friedrich von Pernstein on the episcopal chair of Riga managed to establish themselves in the city, either, and eventually the bishopric was incorporated into the sphere of influence of the Teutonic Order.

== Life in Avignon and book collecting ==
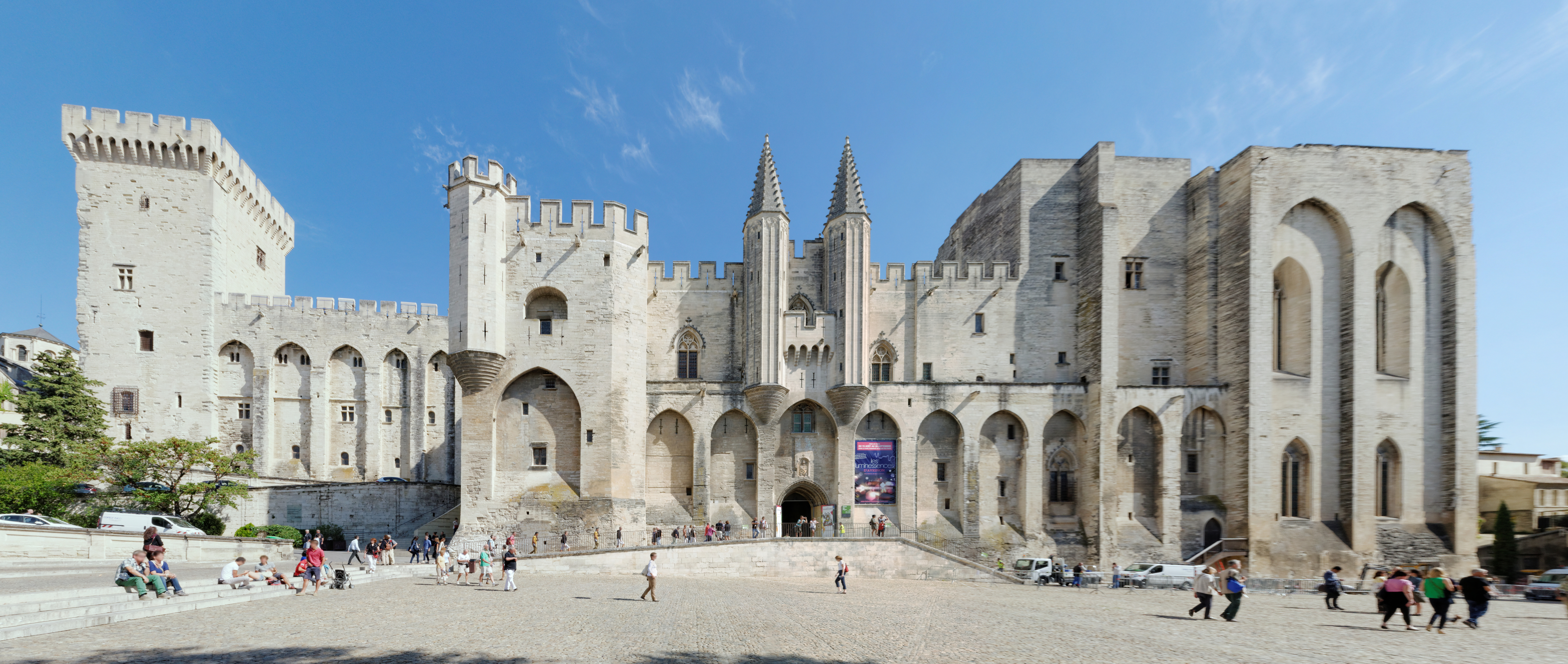
The Papal Palace in Avignon, where Friedrich spent much of his life

Friedrich von Pernstein consequently spent the most of his life in Avignon at the Papal Court, as a kind of exile. During his entire tenure he however continuously received money from Riga, and his life in Avignon appears to have been one of ease, freedom and even luxury. Friedrich von Pernstein was a bibliophile who started collecting books early in life. He is known to have paid for the illumination of books on at least one occasion. Inventories of his library from 1324 to 1325 describe it as big enough to only fit in twelve or eleven coffers. The bulk of the books were on theology and other subjects related to his role in the church, but there were also several Classical authors such as Sallust, Lucan, Seneca the Younger and Boethius. He may have had a manuscript containing a part of the History of Rome by Livy that has since been lost. Another book he owned, unusually for the time, was a translation of the Quran into Latin. Friedrich von Pernstein also authored a biography of Francis of Assisi. It is believed he intended to donate most of his books to the Franciscan convent in Riga. However, most of his library has been impossible to trace. One volume (Ms Borgh.14) is preserved in the Vatican Library, and two volumes that may come from his library are preserved in Riga.
