= Vojtěch I of Pernštejn =

Bohemian nobleman

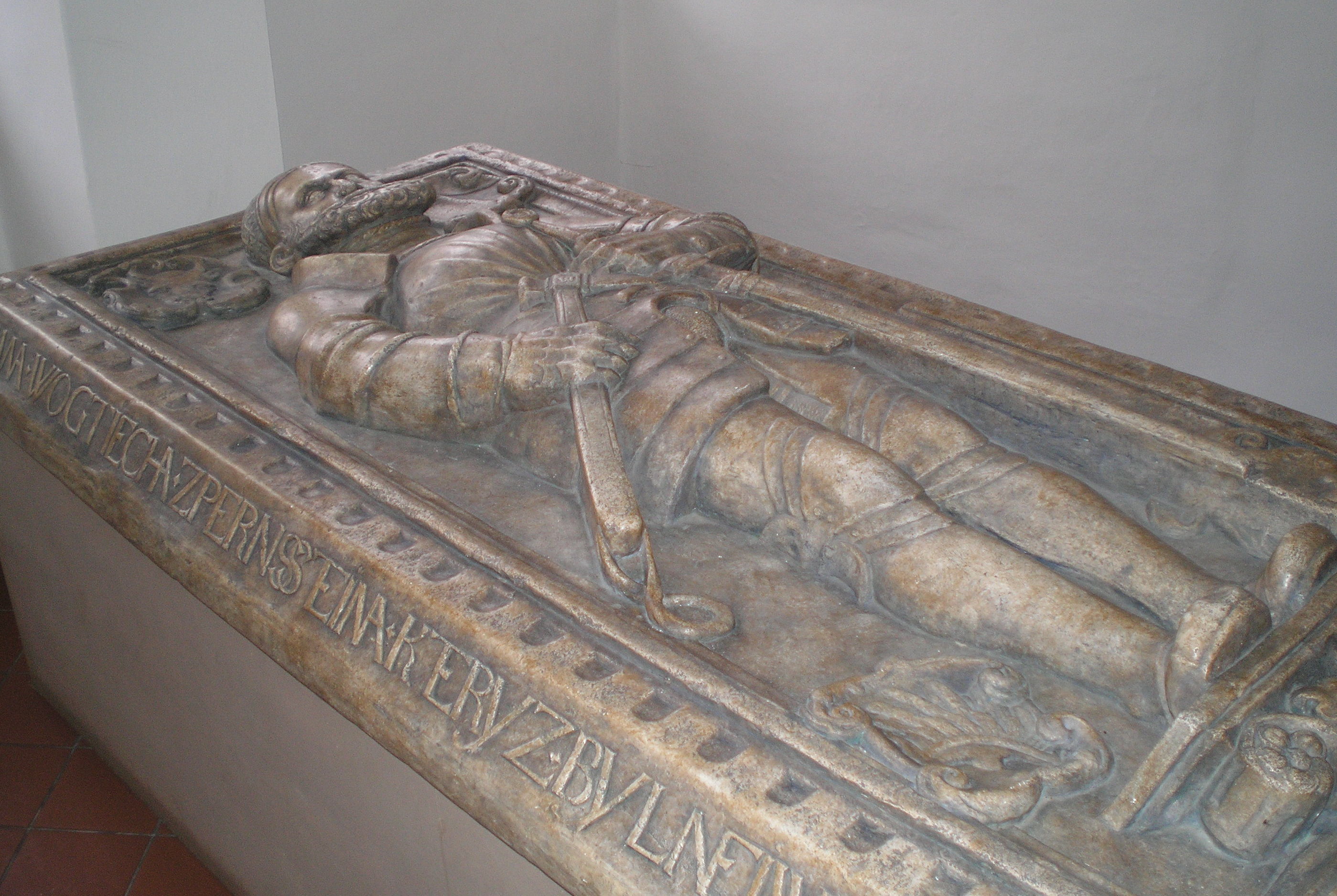
- Vojtěch's tomb in St. Bartholomew's Church in Pardubice
- Born: 4 April 1490; Moravský Krumlov Castle
- Died: 17 March 1534 (aged 43); Prague
- Buried: St. Bartholomew's Church in Pardubice
- Noble family: Pernštejn
- Spouses: Markéta of Kostka of Postupice; Johanka of Wartenberg
- Father: Vilém II of Pernštejn
- Mother: Johanka of Liblice

Vojtěch I of Pernštejn (also known as Adalbert I of Pernstein, Czech: Vojtěch z Pernštejna; 4 April 1490 at Moravský Krumlov Castle – 17 March 1534 in Prague) was a Bohemian nobleman, member of the Pernštejn family. He was High Hofmeister of Bohemia from 1514 to 1523 and from 1526, he was governor of Bohemia. He was considered one of the richest magnates in Bohemia.

== Life ==
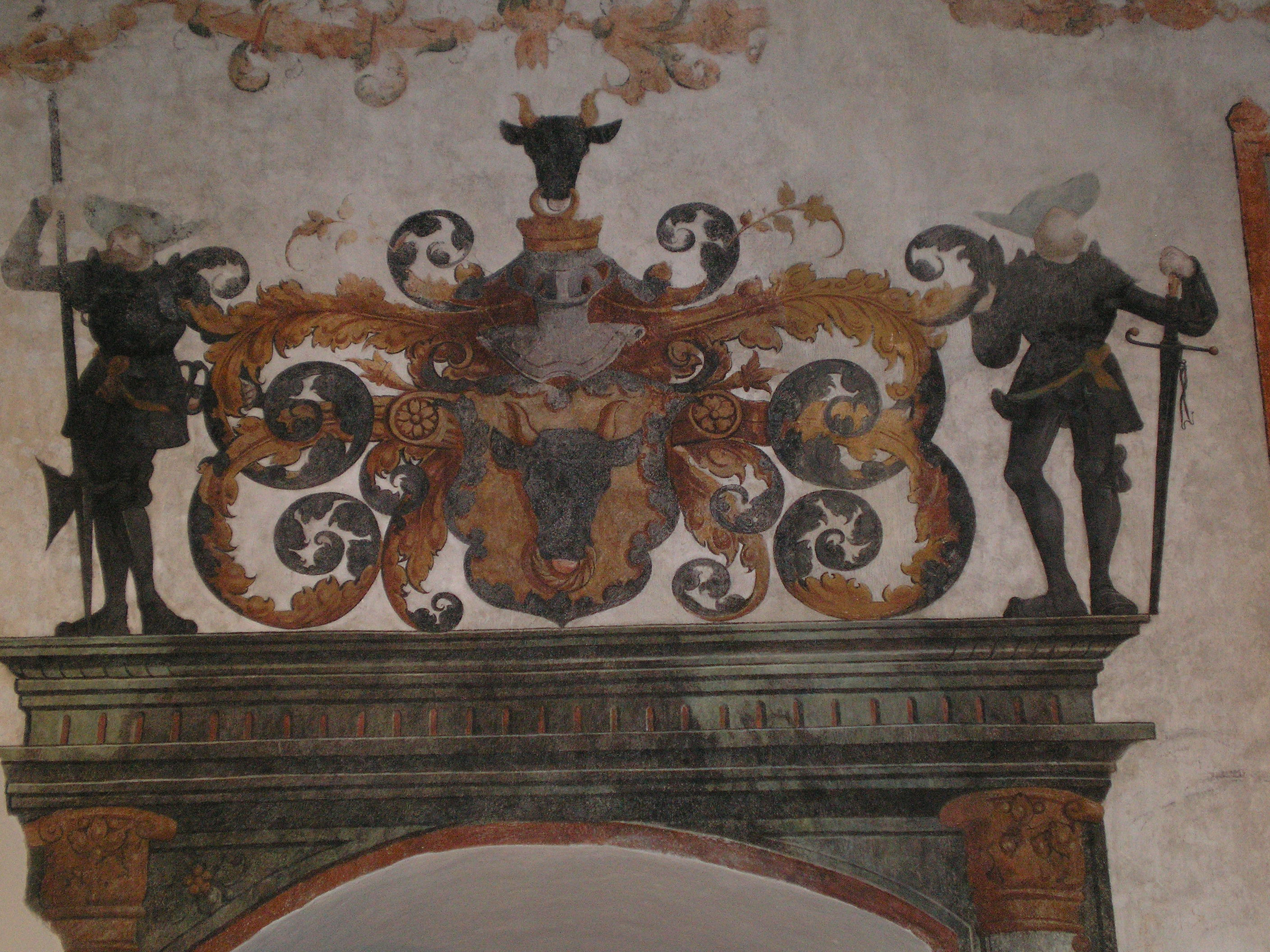
Wall decoration in Pardubice Castle

His parents were Vilém II of Pernštejn and Johanka of Liblice. Little is known about his childhood. In 1497, at the age of seven, he and his elder brother Jan IV were knighted at Pardubice Castle by King Vladislaus II, who was on his way from Prague to Hungary.

In 1507, he married Markéta of Kostka of Postupice. His brother Jan IV married Markéta's sister Anna later that year. Vojtěch and Markéta initially resided at Lanškroun Castle.

His father held the office of High Hofmeister of Bohemia until 1514, when it was transferred to Vojtěch, with permission of the King. However, the Estates objected, pointing out that Vojtěch was only 24 years old and did not have any relevant experience. Vilém, Vojtěch's father argued that he had received the office for life in 1490, so that the transfer only meant that Vojtěch would inherit the office when Vilém died. Vilém felt that Lanškroun Castle was unsuitable for Hluboká, now that he held high office and therefore gave him Hluboká Castle, which he had purchased in 1490 from the Bohemian Chamber. Consequently, Vojtěch styled himself Vojtěch of Pernštejn and Hluboká after 1515.

When his father died in 1521, Vojtěch inherited his Bohemian possessions, while his brother Jan IV inherited the Moravian possessions. Vojtěch moved to Pardubice Castle, which he rebuilt in Renaissance style, and began styling himself "Vojtěch of Pernštejn and Pardubice". In the same year, he inherited Chlumec nad Cidlinou from Vilém Kostka of Postupice, the father of his first wife, even though he had since remarried. He also rebuilt the castle in Chlumec nad Cidlinou in Renaissance style.

Shortly after his father's death, Vojtěch and his brother Jan sided with the Utraquists. This may have been the reason why he lost the post of High Hofmeister, which King Louis II of Bohemia and Hungary temporarily gave to Charles I, Duke of Münsterberg-Oels. Nevertheless, the King confirmed Vojtěch later that year as pledge holder of several possessions in eastern Bohemia, including Kunětická hora Castle, and assured him he would only lose those possessions if the original owners redeemed their loans. In this case, the original owner had been Opatovice Monastery, which had been destroyed during the Hussite wars, this confirmation virtually assured that Vojtěch would be allowed to keep these possessions.

Although Vojtěch had lost the post of High Hofmeister, he still exerted considerable influence until King Louis II died in 1526. Vojtěch was considered a candidate to succeed him, along with Charles I of Münsterberg-Oels, Frederick II of Legnica and Zdeňek Lev of Rožmitál. Among the foreign candidates, Vojtěch supported the Wittelsbach candidate, Louis X. When the Habsburg candidate, Ferdinand I was elected, Vojtěch changed sides and supported him. Ferdinand then appointed Vojtěch Landeshauptmann of Bohemia.

In 1527, Vojtěch acquired more possessions in eastern Bohemia, including Náchod and Nové Město nad Metují, where a Renaissance castle built by Vojtěch still stands. In 1531, he acquired the pledge over Kolín, also in eastern Bohemia. Vojtěch was a notable art lover. He built castles in Renaissance style and furnished them and decorated them with precious wall paintings.

He died in 1534 in Prague and was buried in a marble Sarcophagus in the St. Bartholomew's Church in Pardubice. Since he had no male heir, his brother Jan IV inherited his entire estate, except for a small share for Vojtěch's daughters. Vojtěch's widow, Johanka of Wartenberg, received Nové Město nad Metují as her widow seat, however, she died two years later.

== Marriages and issue ==
Vojtěch married Margaret Kostka of Postupice in 1507; she died in 1515. They had one son:

- Louis (after 1508 – 1526)

Vojtěch then remarried to Johanka of Wartenberg (d. 1536). This marriage produced three daughters:

- Bohunka (b. c. 1519, married Andreas Ungnad of Sonneck
- Anna (b. c. 1525, married in 1540 to Vilém of Sternberg
- Veronika (d. 1529)
