= Medlov (Brno-Country District) =

- Market town
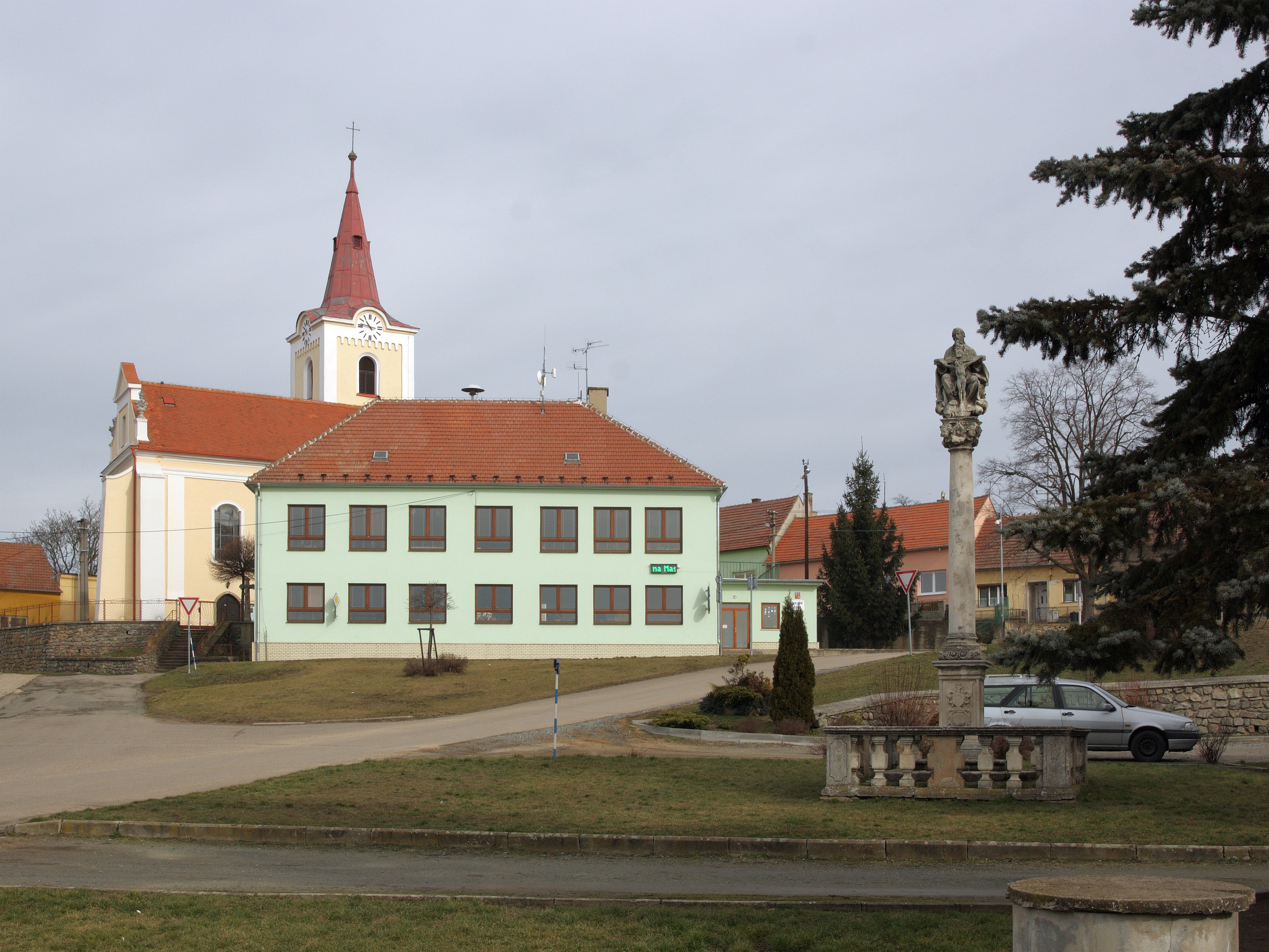
- Centre of Medlov

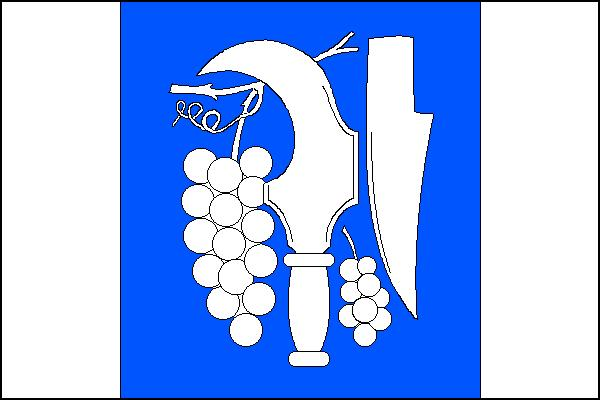
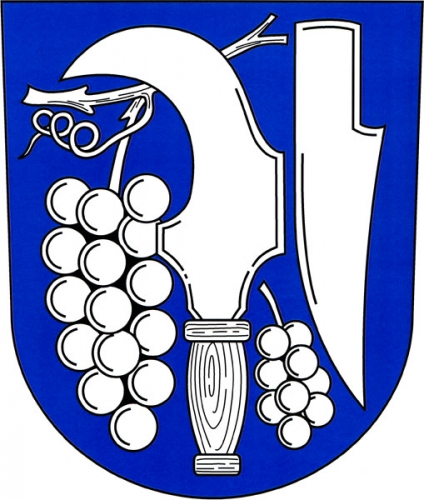
- Flag Coat of arms

- Location in the Czech Republic
- Coordinates: 49°2′6″N 16°31′21″E
- Country: Czech Republic
- Region: South Moravian
- District: Brno-Country
- First mentioned: 1203

Area
  - Total: 10.19 km^{2} (3.93 sq mi)
- Elevation: 192 m (630 ft)

Population (2026-01-01)
  - Total: 896
  - Density: 87.9/km^{2} (228/sq mi)
- Time zone: UTC+1 (CET)
  - Summer (DST): UTC+2 (CEST)
- Postal code: 664 66
- Website: www.mestysmedlov.cz

Medlov (Czech pronunciation: [ˈmɛdlof]; German: Mödlau) is a market town in Brno-Country District in the South Moravian Region of the Czech Republic. It has about 900 inhabitants.

== Geography ==
Medlov is located about 18 kilometres (11 mi) south of Brno. It lies in a flat landscape of the Dyje–Svratka Valley. The market town is situated on the left bank of the Jihlava River.

== History ==
The document from 1173 that mentions Medlov is a forgery. The first trustworthy written mention of Medlov is from 1203. It was a deed of Štěpán of Medlov, who is the ancestor of the Pernštejn family.

Until the Thirty Years' War, Medlov was ethnically a Czech village, but after the war it was settled by Germans. It was promoted to a market town by Emperor Charles VI between 1711 and 1740. In 1749 and 1784, Medlov was severely damaged by fires. Germans formed the majority in the market town until 1946, when they were expelled.

== Demographics ==
Historical population

Year	Pop.	±%
1869	717	—
1880	741	+3.3%
1890	729	−1.6%
1900	780	+7.0%
1910	773	−0.9%

Year	Pop.	±%
1921	783	+1.3%
1930	744	−5.0%
1950	602	−19.1%
1961	635	+5.5%
1970	588	−7.4%

Year	Pop.	±%
1980	618	+5.1%
1991	626	+1.3%
2001	626	+0.0%
2011	671	+7.2%
2021	858	+27.9%

Source: Censuses

== Transport ==
The D52 motorway (part of the European route E461) from Brno to the Czech–Austrian border in Mikulov runs through the municipal territory.

== Sights ==
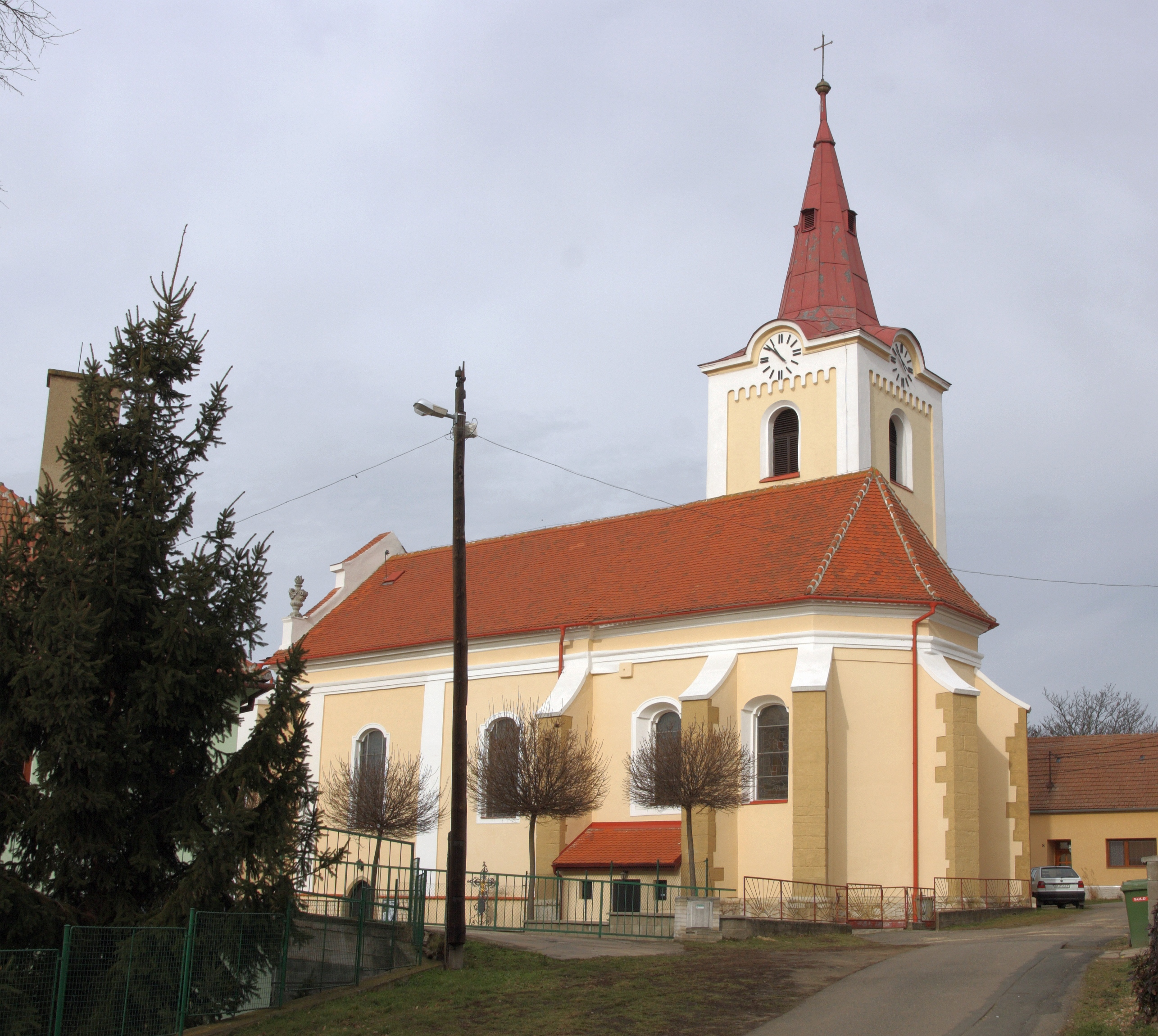
Church of Saint Bartholomew

The main landmark of Medlov is the Church of Saint Bartholomew. It was built in the Gothic style in the second half of the 14th century. After the fire in 1749, it was rebuilt in the Baroque style.
