= Pernštejn family =

Moravian noble family

House of Pernštejn
- Moravian noble family
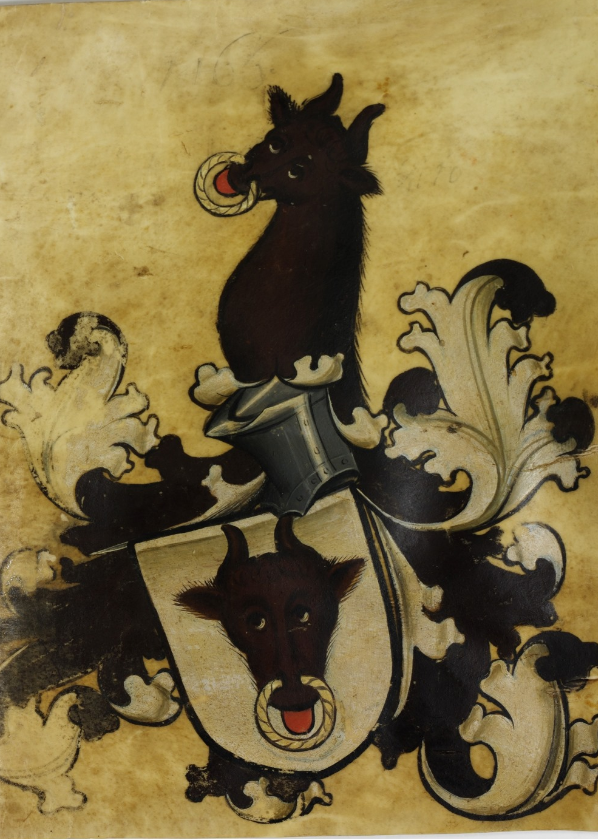
- Black bison head with a golden bast withy through the nose
- Country: Kingdom of Bohemia; Margraviate of Moravia; Habsburg Monarchy
- Current region: Central Europe
- Origin: Pernštejn, Moravia
- Founded: before 1285
- Founder: Stephan I of Medlov
- Final head: Frebonie Eusebie of Pernštejn
- Dissolution: 1646

The House of Pernštejn (German: Pernstein) was one of the oldest and most important (uradel) families originating from Moravian nobility, along with the House of Rosenberg, that played an important role in the medieval history of Bohemian nobility from the 13th century until its extinction in the first half of the 17th century.

== History ==
The first mentioned member of House of Pernštejn was Stephen I, Lord of Medlov, who lived in the 13th century and was first documented in a deed from 1203. His descendants took their name after their first main seat – the Pernštejn Castle.

Throughout history, Pernštejns held some of the most prestigious offices in both Kingdom of Bohemia and Margraviate of Moravia. Four members of the House of Pernštejn were appointed to the position of Land Hejtman of Moravia at various times. Their power peaked in the 16th century during the life of Vilém II of Pernštejn and his sons.

With John Vratislav of Pernštejn the male line of the family became extinct in 1631. The last member of the female line – Polyxena of Pernštejn – then married into the House of Lobkowicz, who incorporated the black bison of Pernštejn family into their coat of arms.

One of the most important authorities on the Pernstejn family history is a Czech historian Petr Vorel.

== History ==
Probable family tree of the early Pernštejns

Stephen I of Medlov ?–before 1235
Vojtěch	Jimram	Stephen II of Zubri
Jimram	Stephen III	Philip	Bohuslav	Havel
Stephen IV
Stephen	Bohuslav	Heralt	Vilém I of Pernštejn ?–1422	Smil

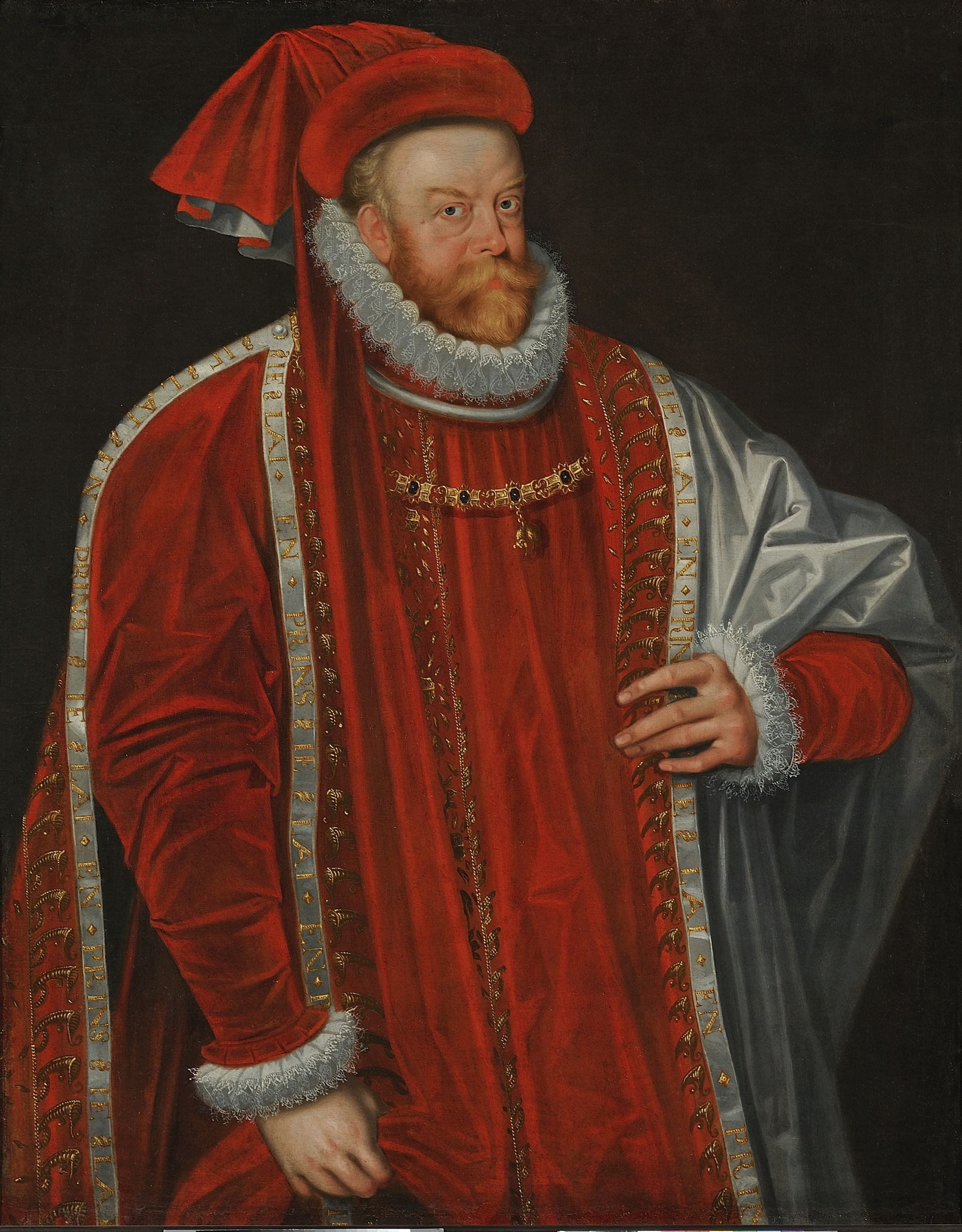
Vratislav (II) of Pernštejn

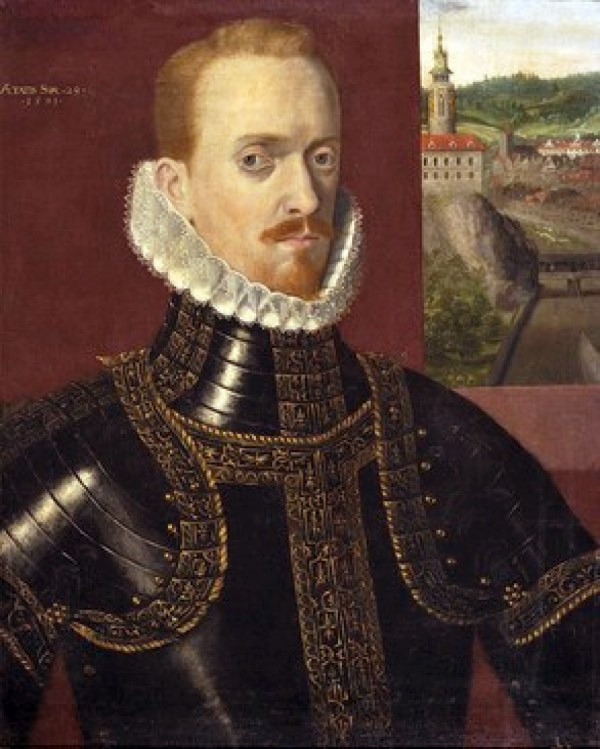
Johann (V) of Pernštejn

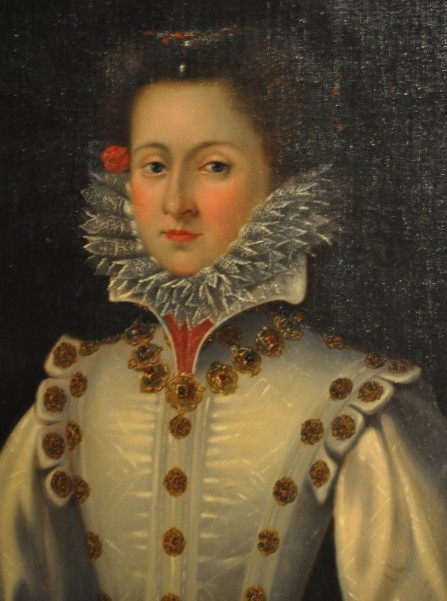
Polyxena of Pernštejn (cropped painting of anonymous artist)

=== Rise ===
The recorded history of Pernštejns starts with Stephen I of Medlov, who became the burgrave of the royal Děvičky Castle (cz:Děvičky) in the first half of the 13th century. He also founded the Convent of Augustinian nuns in Doubravník. Various members of the house under various name appear in historical sources after that. Friedrich von Pernstein (c. 1270–1340) became Archbishop of Riga though he spent most of his life at the Papal Court in Avignon. The next firmly established member of the Pernštejn family is Vilém I who held various offices before becoming the Land Hejtman of Moravia in 1421. He sympathized with the teaching of Jan Hus, both his sons – Bavor and Jan II – fought for the side of Hussites during the Hussite Wars. In 1473, Jan II was elected to be one of the four stewards of Margraviate of Moravia. Both brothers also financed the expensive reconstruction of the Pernštejn Castle after it burned out in 1457. Jan II's son Vratislav served first as the Oberstlandkämmerer, then as Land Hejtman of Moravia like his grandfather. He extended the family holdings by buying the domains of Plumlov and Prostějov.

=== Peak ===
Vilém II of Pernštejn inherited all family holdings and became the most renowned member of the Pernštejn family. He held the offices of the Supreme Marshall and later that of Oberstlandhofmeister. He was a skilled manager and acquired vast domains in both Bohemia and Moravia. House of Perštejn was the second richest and the second most powerful noble house in Bohemia after the House of Rosenberg at the time. Inspired by the Rosenbergs, he also built systems of ponds and promoted fish farming on his domains. He was respected for his unusual religious tolerance and lived to a high age of 86 years. The family holdings were then split between his two sons.

His son Vojtěch I inherited the Bohemian portion of the family holdings. He served as the Highest Hofmistr of the Kingdom of Bohemia like his father. In 1526, after the death of Louis Jagiellon, Vojtěch I was even considered a potential candidate for the emptied throne. He died suddenly at the age of 44 and with no male heirs.
Vilém II's other son – Jan IV of Pernštejn – inherited the Moravian part of the dominion. He finished the renaissance reconstruction of the Pernštejn Castle, started by his father. In 1526, he was in charge of the martial aid provided to the king Louis Jagiellon before the Battle of Mohács by the lords of Moravia. After his brother's premature death, he became the sole overlord of the Pernštejn dominion and gained the nickname "Jan the Rich". At that time the estimated size of the Pernštejn dominion was three times the size of the Rosenberg dominion. He too held the office of Land Hejtman of Moravia.

=== Decline ===
Jan IV the Rich had three sons: Vojtěch II, Jaroslav and Vratislav II. Vojtěch II expanded the family library and started the art collection of Pernštejn family. He and Jaroslav both died without heirs and so the whole dominion was once again in the hands of one person – Vratislav II. Vratislav II of Pernštejn was a well traveled man. He studied at universities in Prague, Vienna, later also in France and Italy. He served as an envoy to the Habsburg kings and – during his stay in Spain – married a Spanish noblewoman Maria Manrique de Lara (1538–1608). They both moved back to Bohemia and Maria Manrique de Lara brought with her a statue that later became famous as the Infant Jesus of Prague. Their glamorous lifestyle in Prague combined with dowries for their five daughters resulted in a loss of domains and later debts, from which the House of Pernštejn never quite recovered.

In 1596, his son Jan V was forced to sell the main seat of their family – the Pernštejn Castle. He died a year later on a battlefield. His only son Jan Vratislav also died on a battlefield in 1631 during the Thirty Years War. He was the last male member of House of Pernštejn. His sister, Frebonie Eusebie of Pernštejn (1596–1646)– the last female member of the family – died fifteen years later. Through the marriage of Zdeněk Popel of Lobkowicz with Polyxena of Pernštejn – daughter of Vratislav II of Pernštejn (1530–1582)– the black bison of Pernštejn family was added to the House of Lobkowicz coat of arms where it appears to this day.

== Notable family members ==
- Jan II of Pernštejn (c. 1406–1475), Lord Chamberlain of the District Court at Brno
- Vilém II of Pernštejn (c. 1435–1521), governor of the Kingdom of Bohemia
- Zikmund of Pernštejn (c. 1437–1473)
- Vojtěch I of Pernštejn (1490–1534), governor of the Kingdom of Bohemia
- Jan IV of Pernštejn (1487–1548), High Treasurer of Moravia
- Vratislav II of Pernštejn (c. 1530–1582), diplomat
- Polyxena of Pernštejn (c. 1566–1642), catholic patron, founder of Friars Minor Capuchin Monastery in Roudnice nad Labem. Married Zdeněk Vojtěch Popel of Lobkowicz

== Notable castles in possession ==
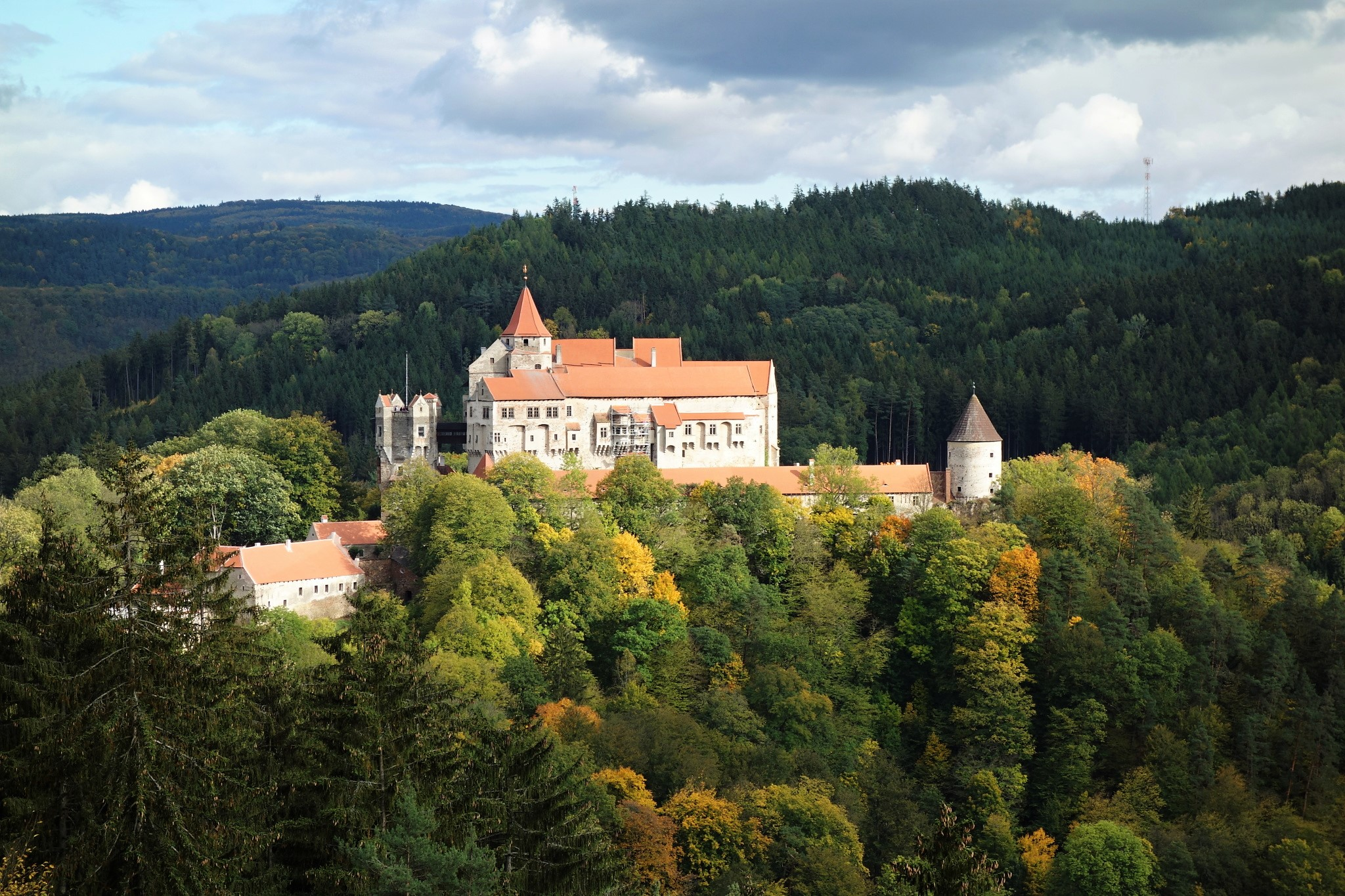
Pernštejn Castle

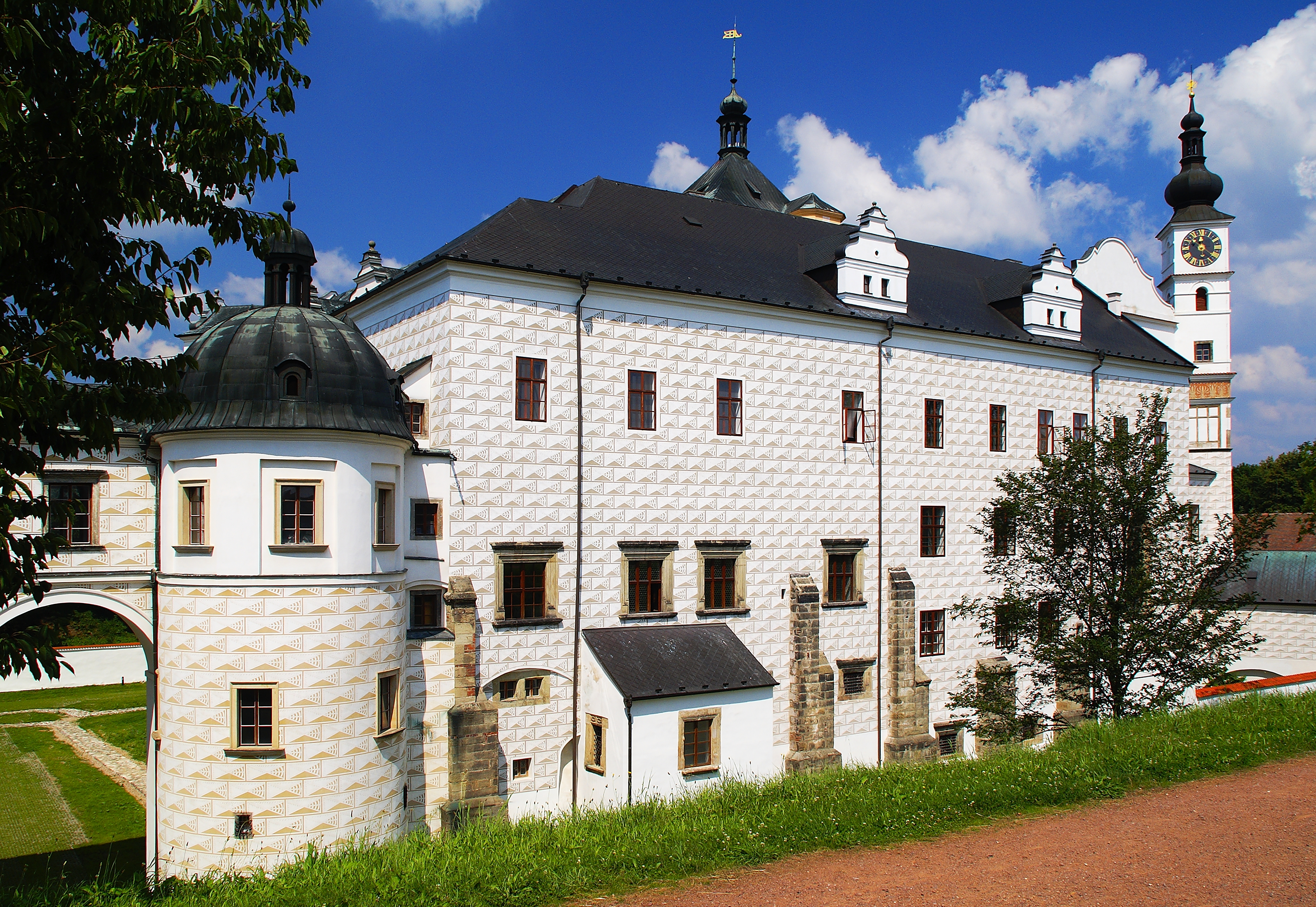
Pardubice Castle

- Pernštejn Castle (before 1285 – 1596)
- Helfštýn Castle (1474–1554)
- Hranice Castle (1475–1547)
- Plumlov Castle (1490 – before 1619)
- Pardubice Castle (1491–1560)
- Tovačov Castle (1503–1597)
- Lanškroun Castle (1507–1588)
- Prostějov Castle (1522 – around 1600)
- Litomyšl Castle (1552–1646)

== Sources ==
- von Kadich, Heinrich (1899). Der Mährische Adel (PDF) (in German). Nürnberg: Bauer und Raspe.
