= Plumlov =

- Town
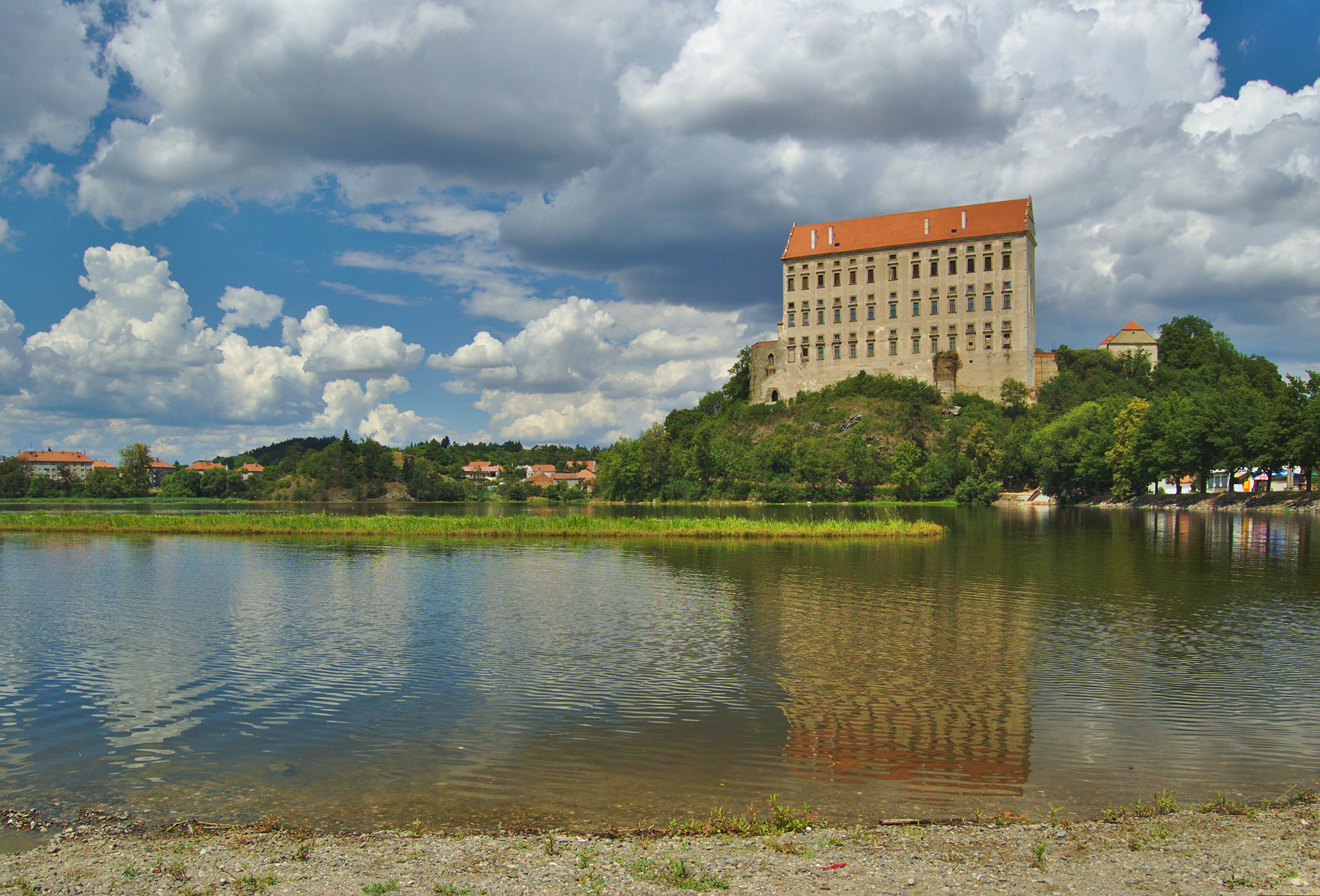
- View towards the Plumlov Castle

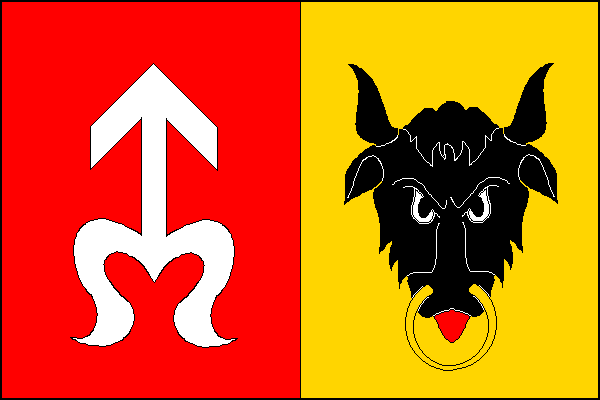
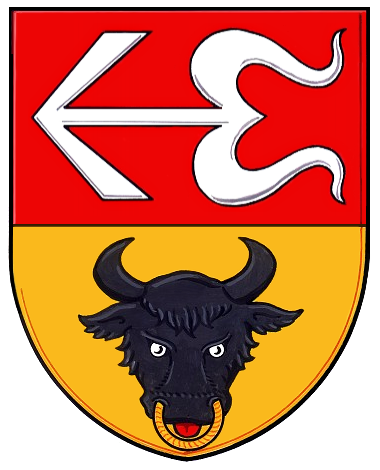
- Flag Coat of arms

- Location in the Czech Republic
- Coordinates: 49°27′58″N 17°0′54″E
- Country: Czech Republic
- Region: Olomouc
- District: Prostějov
- First mentioned: 1310

Government
  - Mayor: Gabriela Jančíková

Area
  - Total: 11.54 km^{2} (4.46 sq mi)
- Elevation: 308 m (1,010 ft)

Population (2026-01-01)
  - Total: 2,271
  - Density: 196.8/km^{2} (509.7/sq mi)
- Time zone: UTC+1 (CET)
  - Summer (DST): UTC+2 (CEST)
- Postal code: 798 03
- Website: www.mestoplumlov.cz

Plumlov (Czech pronunciation: [ˈplumlof]; German: Plumenau, Plumau) is a town in Prostějov District in the Olomouc Region of the Czech Republic. It has about 2,300 inhabitants. Plumlov is known for the Plumlov Castle, which is protected as a national cultural monument.

== Administrative division ==
Plumlov consists of four municipal parts (in brackets population according to the 2021 census):

- Plumlov (1,619)
- Hamry (143)
- Soběsuky (301)
- Žárovice (194)

== Geography ==
Plumlov is located about 6 kilometres (4 mi) west of Prostějov and 21 km (13 mi) southwest of Olomouc. It lies in the Drahany Highlands. The highest point is at 355 m (1,165 ft) above sea level.

The Hloučela River flows through the town. Plumlov Reservoir was built on this river in 1936 and is one of the oldest in the Morava River basin. The second notable body of water next to the town is the fishpond Podhradský rybník.

== History ==
The first written mention of Plumlov Castle is from 1310, however it was founded in the mid-13th century, before 1273. It was founded during the colonisation by King Ottokar II. The castle was owned by his illegitimate son Nicholas I. The settlement near the castle is documented when King John of Bohemia sold the castle to the lords of Kravaře in 1322. Between 1348 and 1384, Plumlov was promoted to a market town.

During the rule of the Pernštejn family from 1495 to 1599, Plumlov prospered and economically developed. At the end of the 16th century, the estate was acquired by the Liechtenstein family, who owned it until 1931.

The original Plumlov Castle was damaged during the Thirty Years' War. After the Liechtensteins had built a new castle in 1680–1690, it served only as an economic building. After being damaged by a storm in 1801, it was demolished.

== Demographics ==
Historical population

Year	Pop.	±%
1869	2,217	—
1880	2,466	+11.2%
1890	2,442	−1.0%
1900	2,432	−0.4%
1910	2,659	+9.3%

Year	Pop.	±%
1921	2,523	−5.1%
1930	2,753	+9.1%
1950	2,508	−8.9%
1961	2,589	+3.2%
1970	2,452	−5.3%

Year	Pop.	±%
1980	2,567	+4.7%
1991	2,300	−10.4%
2001	2,268	−1.4%
2011	2,382	+5.0%
2021	2,257	−5.2%

Source: Censuses

== Transport ==
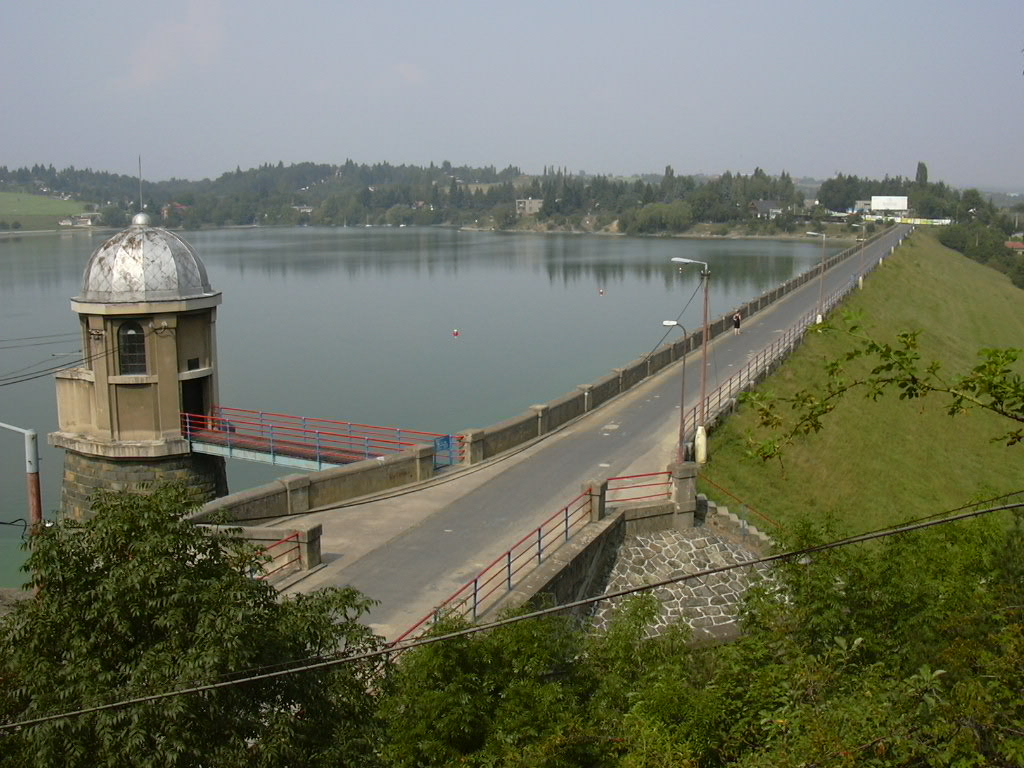
Plumlov Reservoir

There are no railways or major roads passing through the municipal territory.

== Sights ==
Plumlov is known for the Plumlov Castle. It was personally designed by Prince Karl Eusebius of Liechtenstein, an avid devotee to the art of building. After his death in 1684, it was only partially completed. The castle has an unusual appearance, as its dimensions were chosen with regard to the projected four-wing building. The castle was confiscated from its owners in 1931. Today it is in the possession of the town of Plumlov that is gradually reconstructing it. It is used for cultural events.

Only a part of the defensive tower and small fragments remain of the original castle. The entire complex of the castle ruin and the newer castle is protected as a national cultural monument.
