= Porta coeli Convent =

Covent in Předklášteří, Czech Republic

Coordinates: 49°21′11″N 16°24′03″E

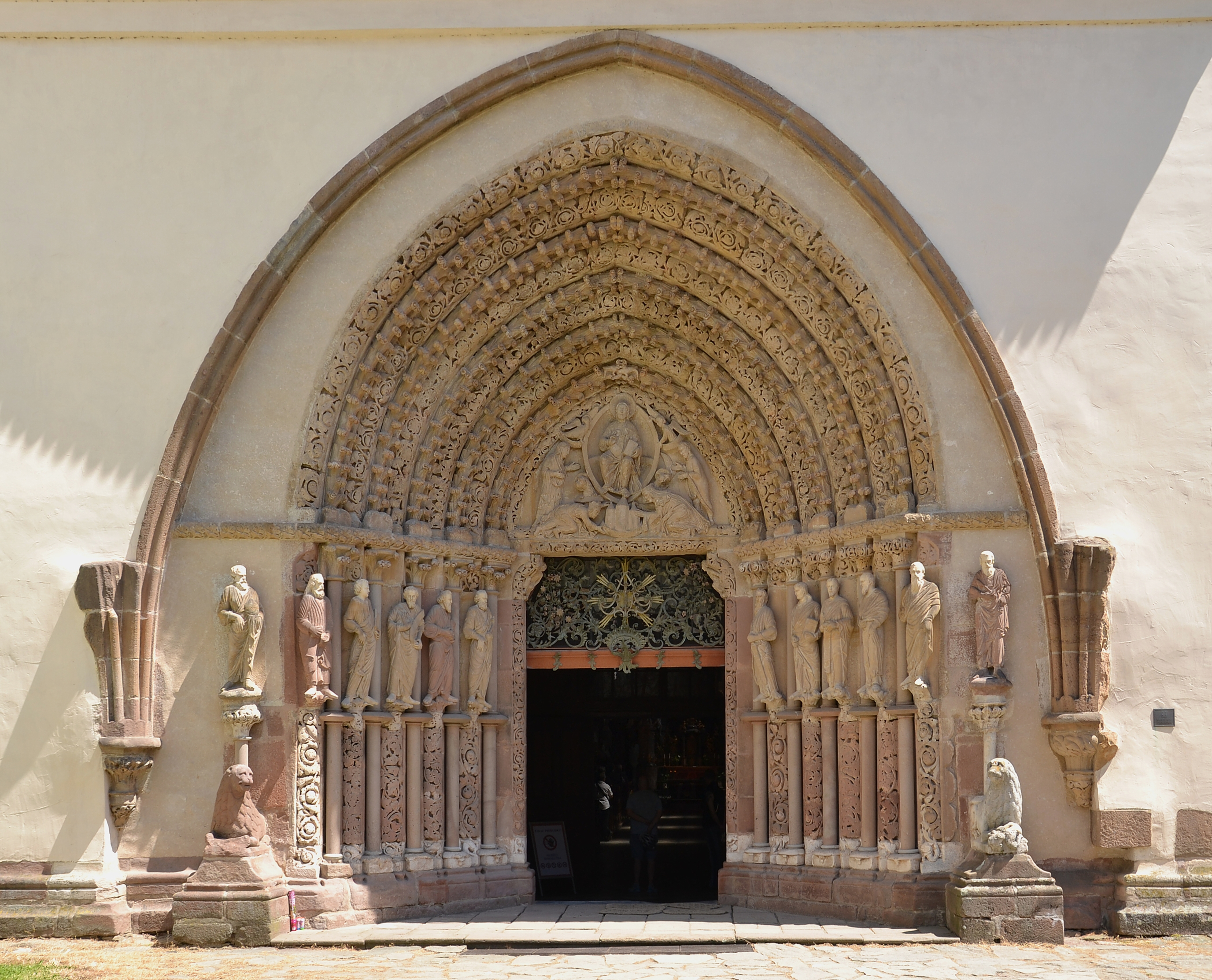
Western portal of the convent church

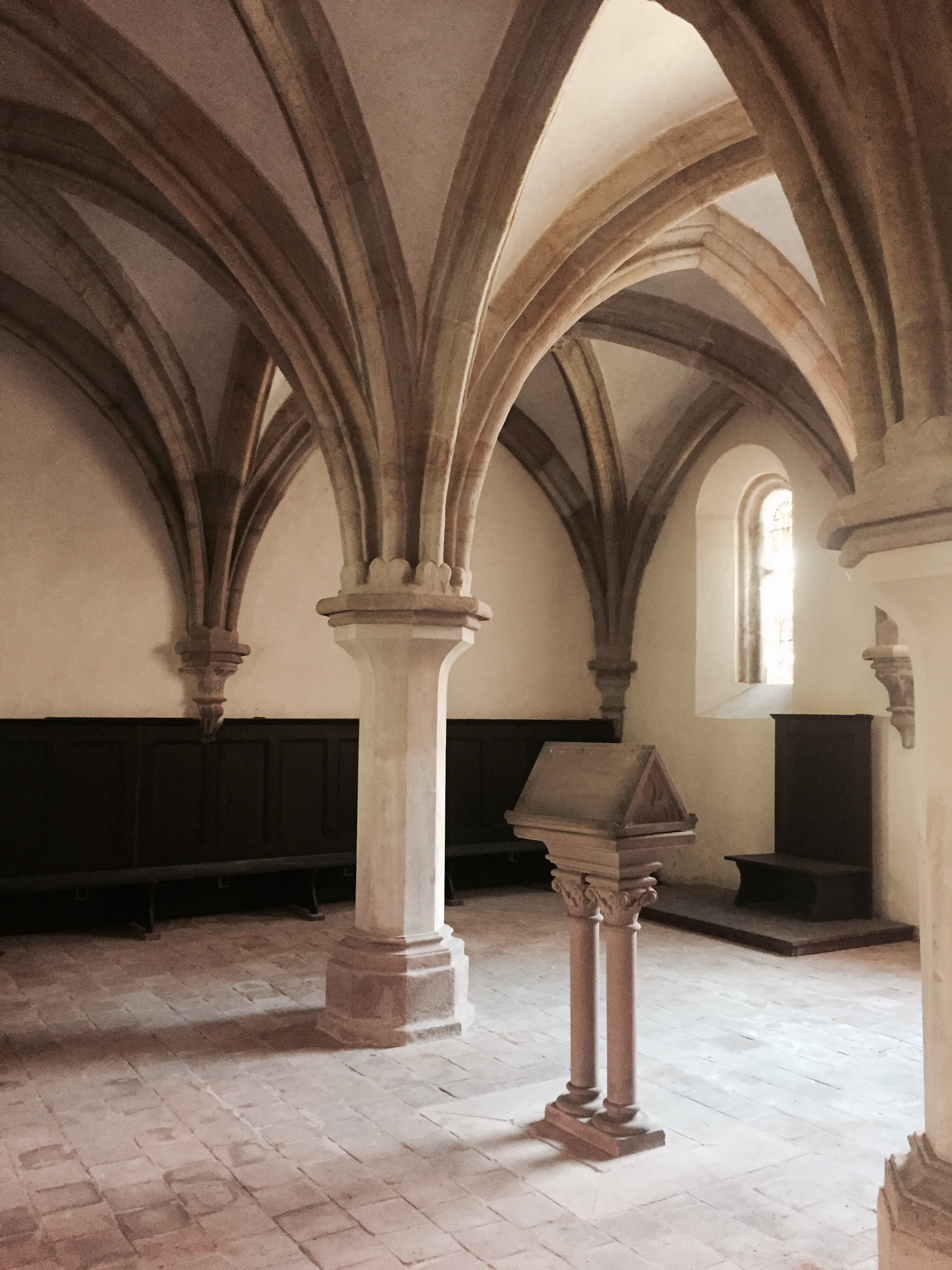
Chapter house

Porta coeli (Czech: Cisterciácké opatství Porta coeli, Latin: Heaven's Gate) is a 13th-century convent located in Předklášteří, near Tišnov, South Moravian Region, Czech Republic. Situated in the valley of the Svratka River, this Cistercian convent was founded in 1233 by Queen Constance of Hungary. A granddaughter of Raynald of Châtillon, and the widow of King Ottokar I of Bohemia, Queen Constance was also buried at Porta coeli.

The church was consecrated in 1239 by Bernhard, then-Bishop of Prague, with the approval and presence of Robert the Englishman, then-Bishop of Olomouc. It has three aisles, a transept and a rather long sanctuary ending in a five-sided apse. Despite the austerity of the Cistercian rules, the western façade has a portal reminiscent of French cathedrals. It is unique in the area of Europe east of Rhine.

The interior contains valuable Baroque furnishings from after 1764: on the high altar there is a painting by F. A. Maulbertsch, a sculpture by Andreas Schweigl, and other paintings by the Jesuit artist Ignác Raab. The cloister walk is noteworthy for its early Gothic vaulting, its figurative and decorative carvings, and the chapter house which was built between 1260 and 1270.

There is a brewery situated on the premises of the monastery, opened in 2019 as "Vorkloster", the German name for the village where the monastery is located (Předklášteří).

== Attractions ==
The convent was saved twice (in 1861 and 1990) from destruction by the efforts of Europe's smallest nation, the Lusatian Sorbs, specifically by the convent of the Marienstern Monastery in Panschwitz-Kuckau.

The asteroid 3276 Porta Coeli is named after this convent.

== Gallery ==
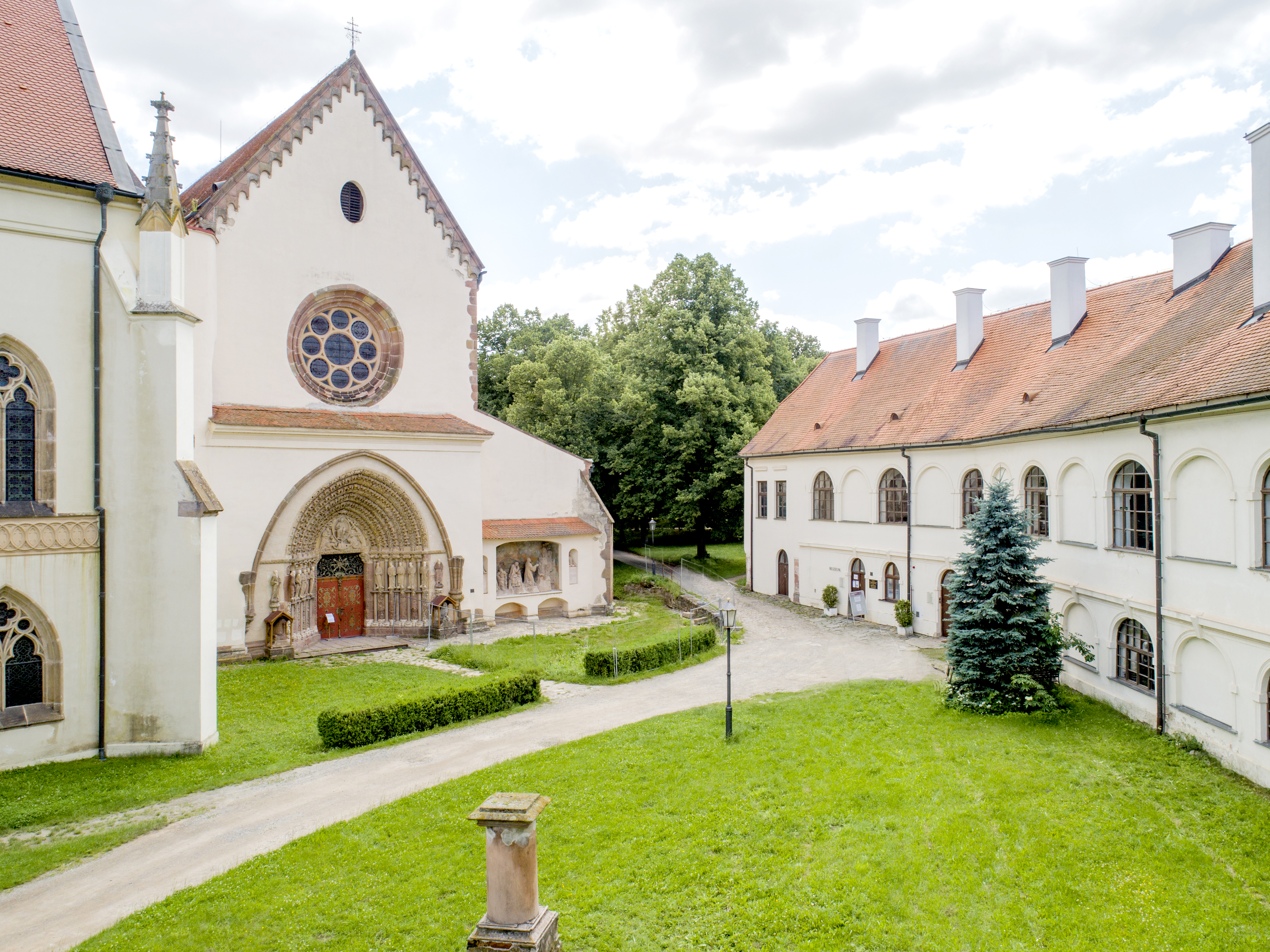
Portal of the church with neo-gothic chapel

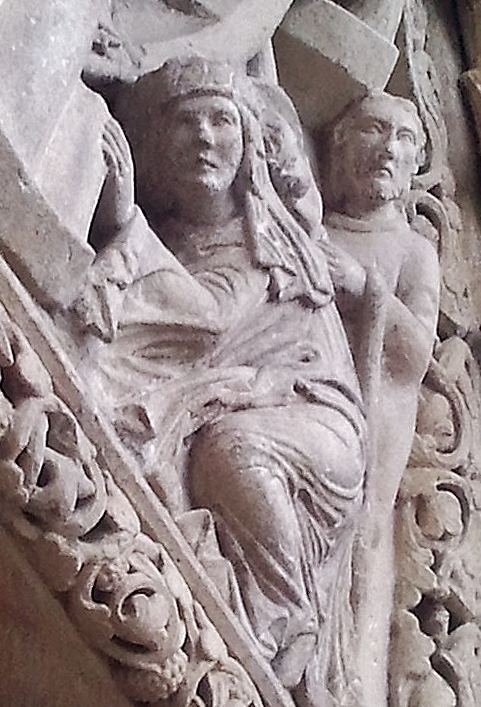
Tympanum - probably the King Otakar I. and Constance of Hungary kneeling at the feet of Jesus

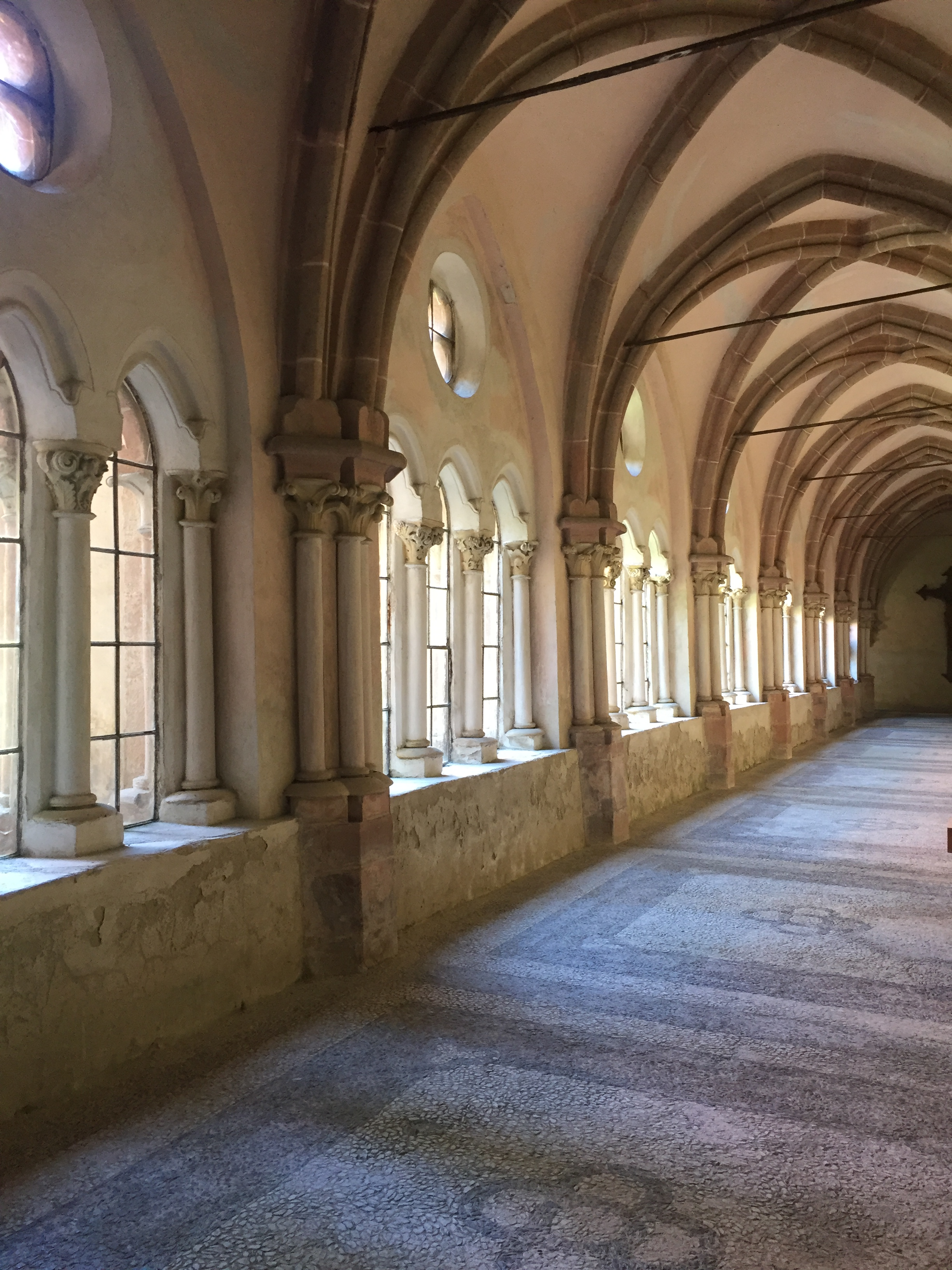
The Cloister

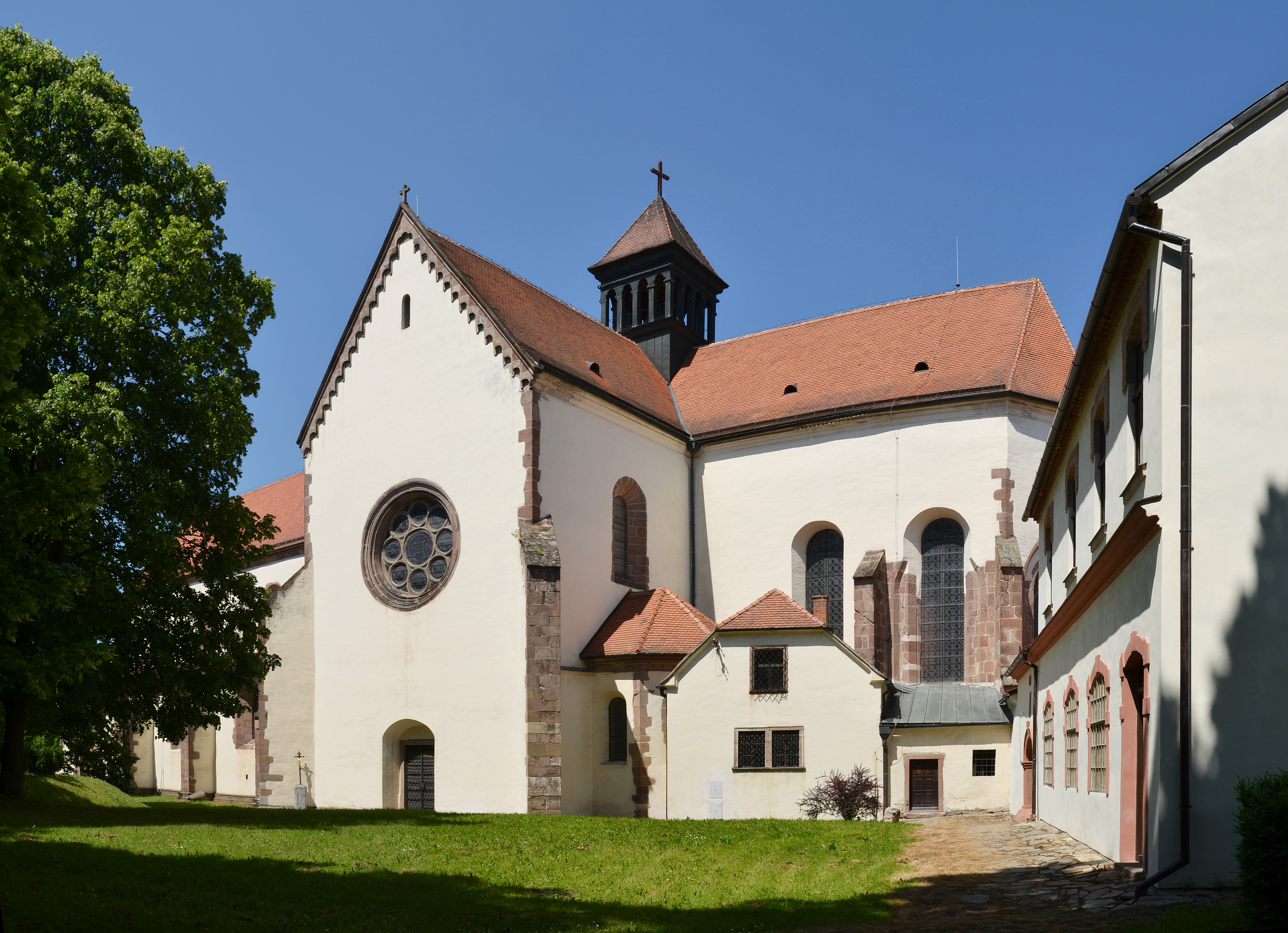
Exhibition showing history of the monastery

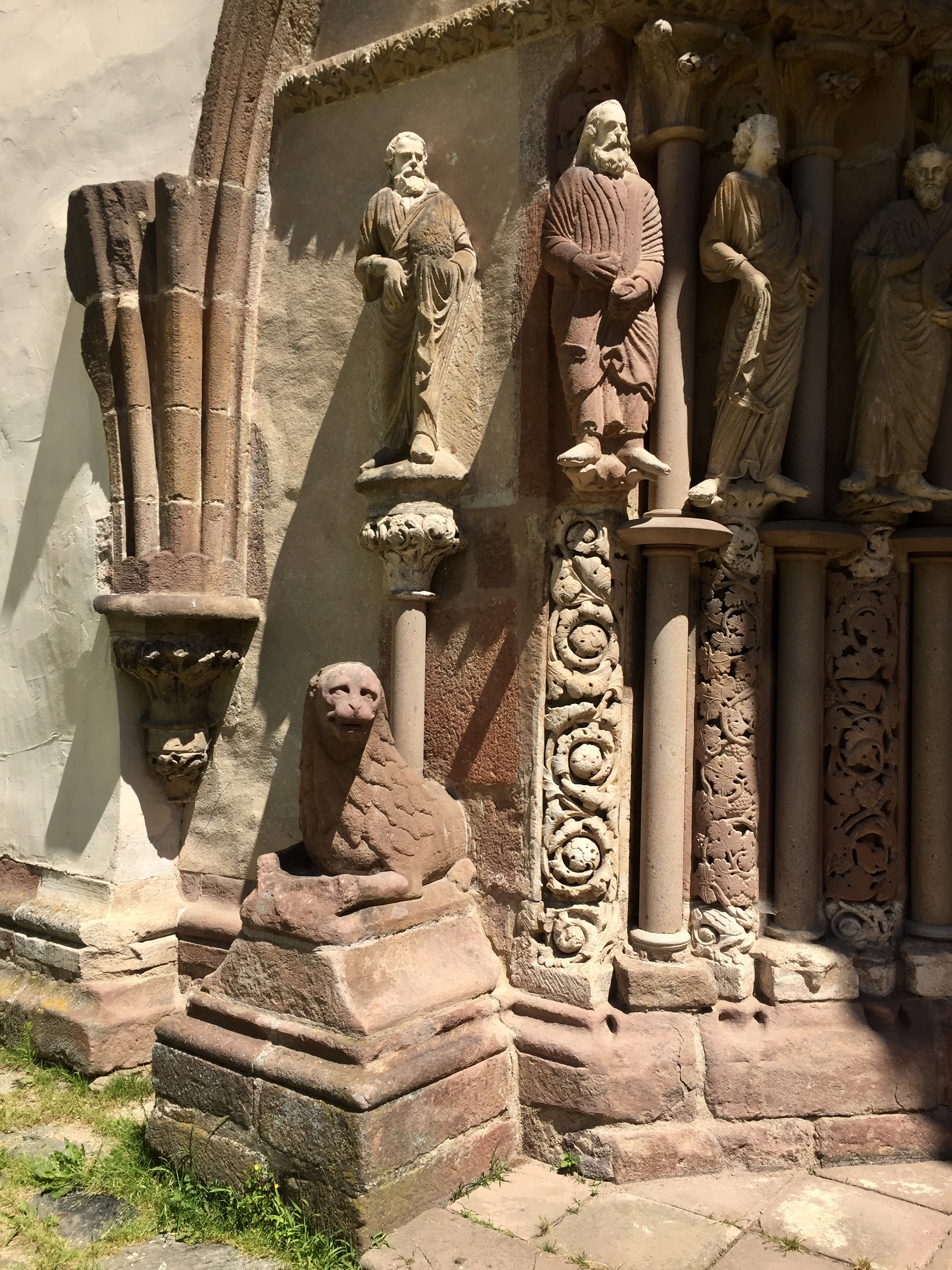
The detail of the Postal with Apostels

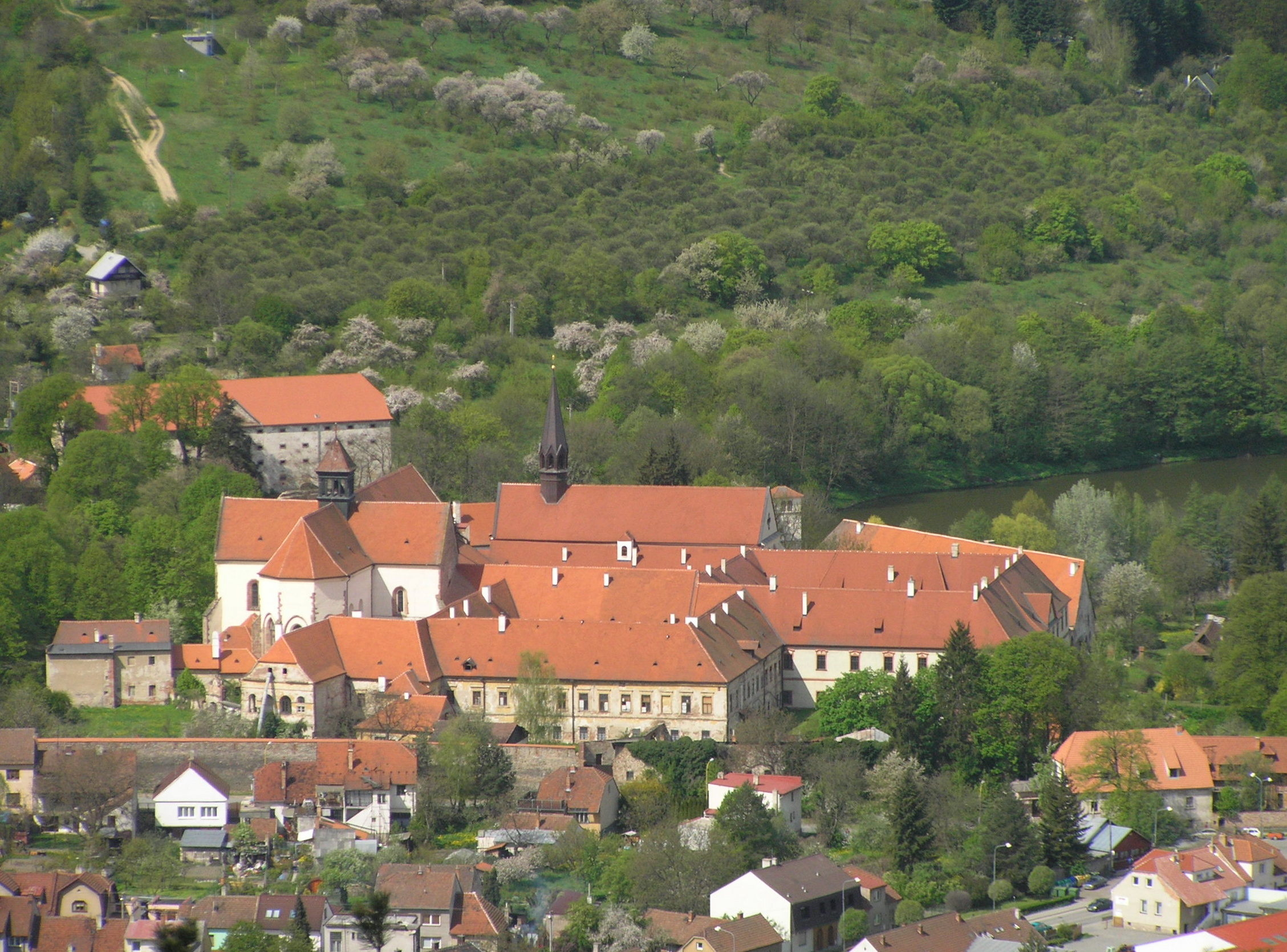
View from the east
