= Doubravník =

- Market town
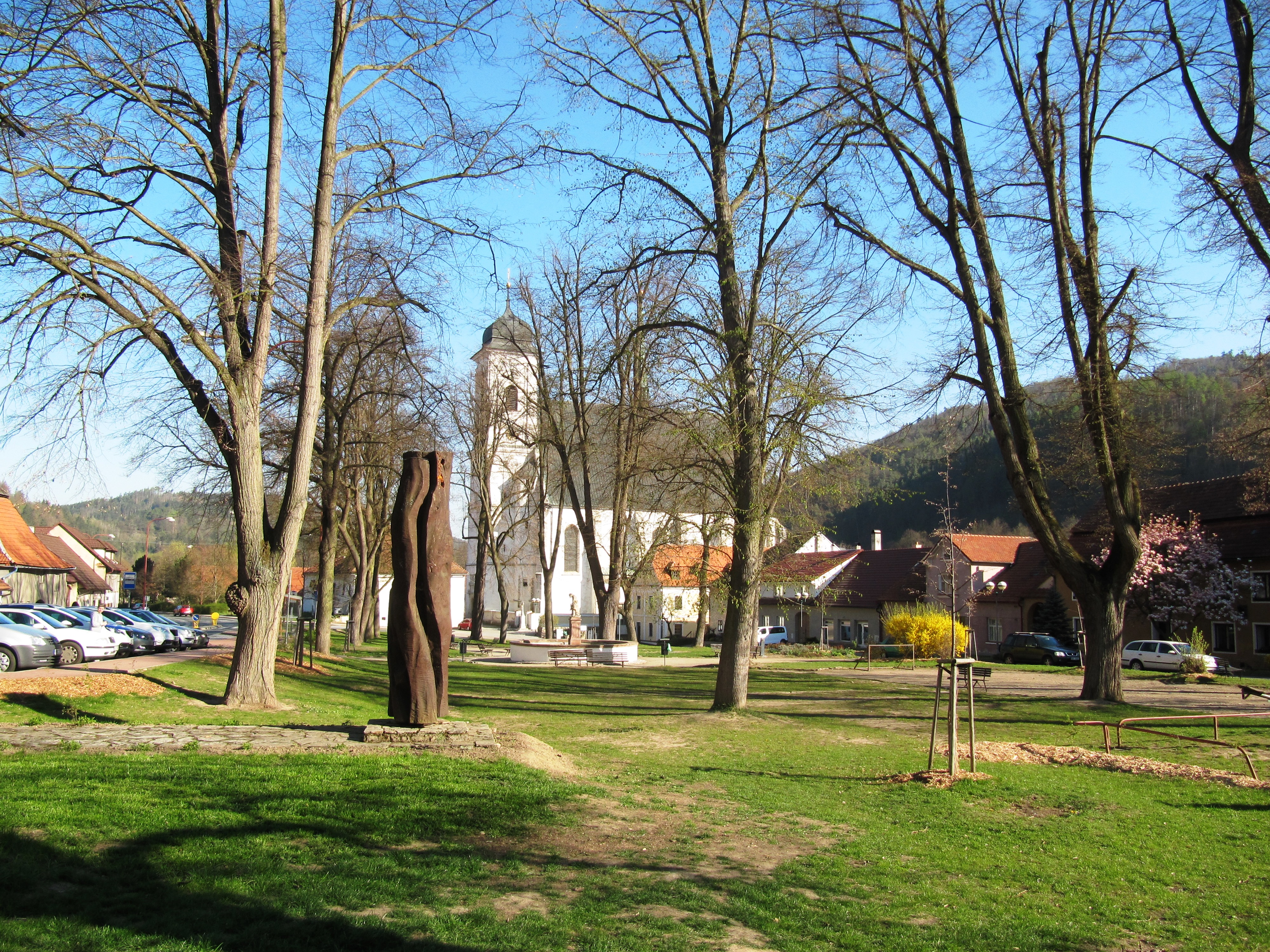
- Park at the town square

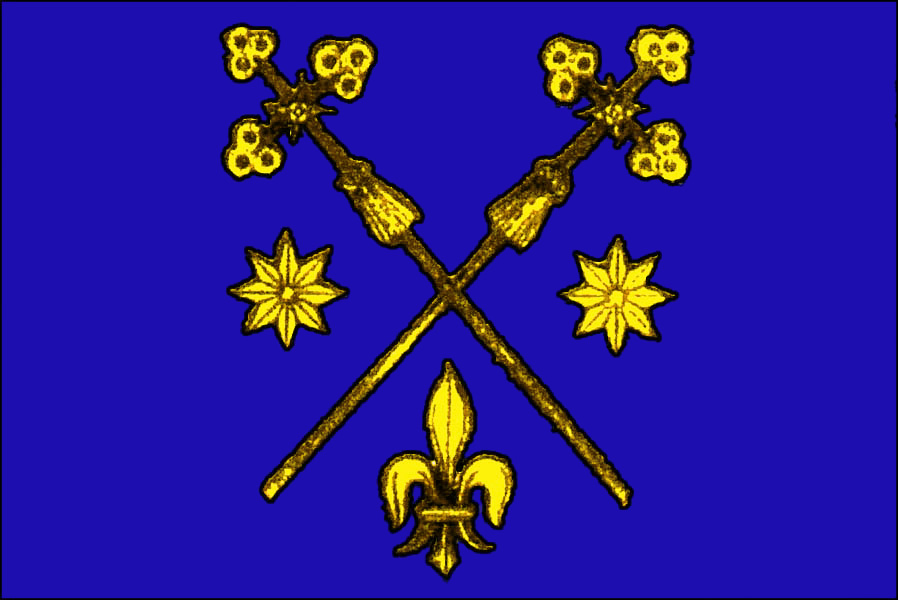
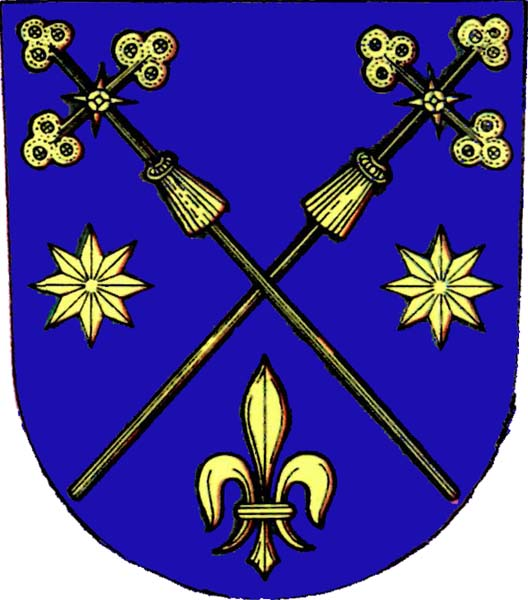
- Flag Coat of arms

- Location in the Czech Republic
- Coordinates: 49°25′27″N 16°21′10″E
- Country: Czech Republic
- Region: South Moravian
- District: Brno-Country
- First mentioned: 1208

Area
  - Total: 11.48 km^{2} (4.43 sq mi)
- Elevation: 313 m (1,027 ft)

Population (2026-01-01)
  - Total: 842
  - Density: 73.3/km^{2} (190/sq mi)
- Time zone: UTC+1 (CET)
  - Summer (DST): UTC+2 (CEST)
- Postal codes: 592 61, 592 62
- Website: www.doubravnik.cz

Doubravník (Czech pronunciation: [ˈdoubravɲiːk]) is a market town in Brno-Country District in the South Moravian Region of the Czech Republic. It has about 800 inhabitants. The historic centre is well preserved and is protected as an urban monument zone.

== Administrative division ==
Doubravník consists of two municipal parts (in brackets population according to the 2021 census):

- Doubravník (779)
- Křížovice (13)

== Geography ==
Doubravník is located about 29 kilometres (18 mi) northwest of Brno. It lies in the Upper Svratka Highlands. The highest point is a hill on the northern municipal border at 558 m (1,831 ft) above sea level. The built-up area is situated in a valley of the Svratka River.

== History ==
The first written mention of Doubravník is from 1208, when a Franciscan convent was founded here and a church consecrated to the Holy Cross already stood here. The most notable owners of Doubravník were the Pernštejn family.

== Demographics ==
Historical population

| Year | Pop. | ±% |
|---|---|---|
| 1869 | 1,129 | — |
| 1880 | 1,041 | −7.8% |
| 1890 | 1,011 | −2.9% |
| 1900 | 981 | −3.0% |
| 1910 | 1,006 | +2.5% |

| Year | Pop. | ±% |
|---|---|---|
| 1921 | 998 | −0.8% |
| 1930 | 997 | −0.1% |
| 1950 | 873 | −12.4% |
| 1961 | 866 | −0.8% |
| 1970 | 857 | −1.0% |

| Year | Pop. | ±% |
|---|---|---|
| 1980 | 887 | +3.5% |
| 1991 | 835 | −5.9% |
| 2001 | 835 | +0.0% |
| 2011 | 800 | −4.2% |
| 2021 | 792 | −1.0% |

Source: Censuses

== Transport ==
Doubravník is located on the railway line Žďár nad Sázavou–Tišnov.

== Sights ==
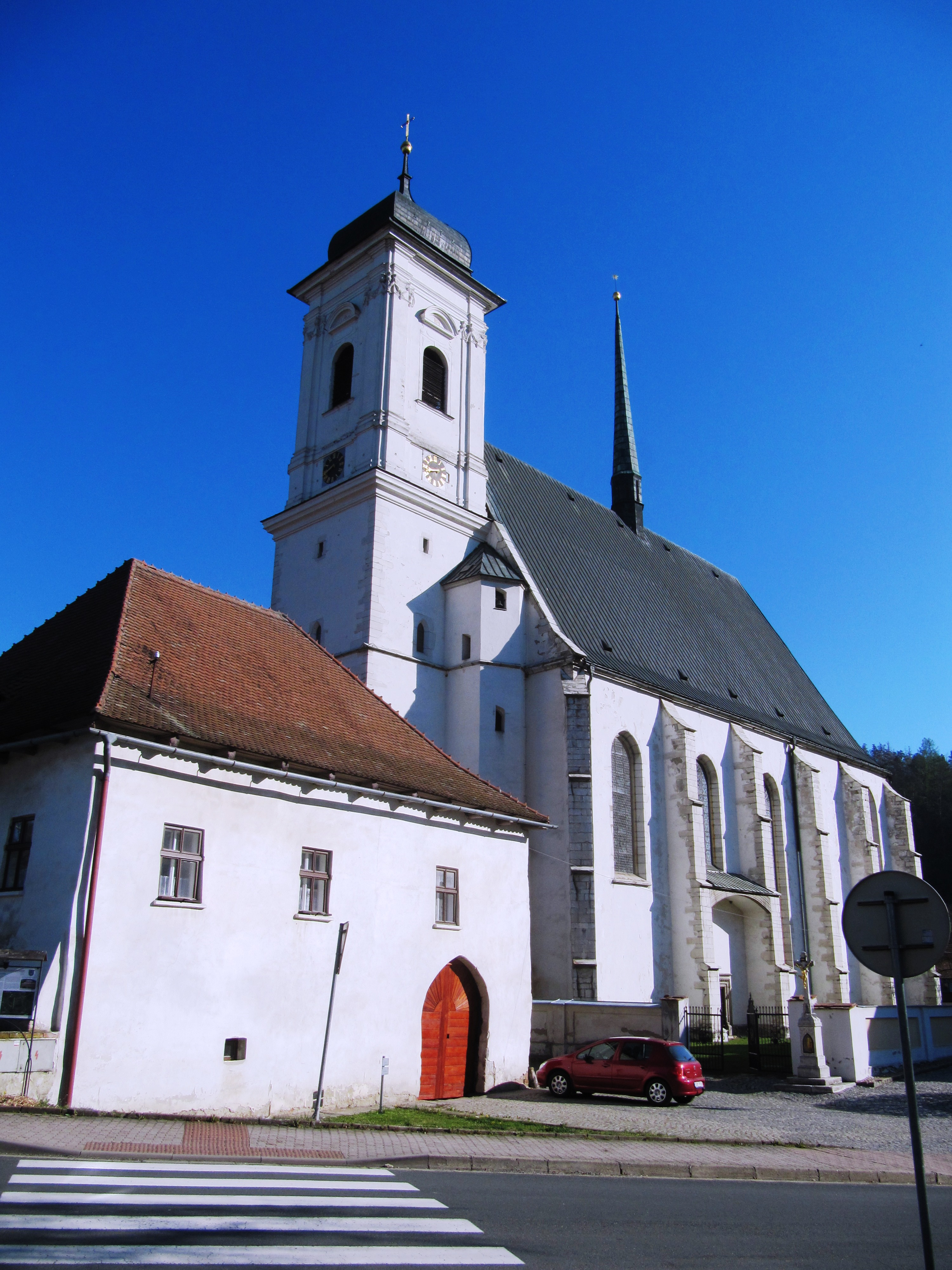
Church of the Exaltation of the Holy Cross

The main landmark is the Church of the Exaltation of the Holy Cross. It was built in the Gothic-Renaissance style in 1535–1541. It is the only religious building in the country that is made of marble. The church includes the neo-Gothic tomb of the Mitrovský family from 1867. The tomb contains 19 cast iron sarcophagi with craft, historical and architectural value.

The town square contains preserved old houses. The house No. 35 is older than the church and has a valuable Gothic gate.
