= Lobkowicz Palace =

Building in Prague, Czech Republic

The Lobkowicz Palace
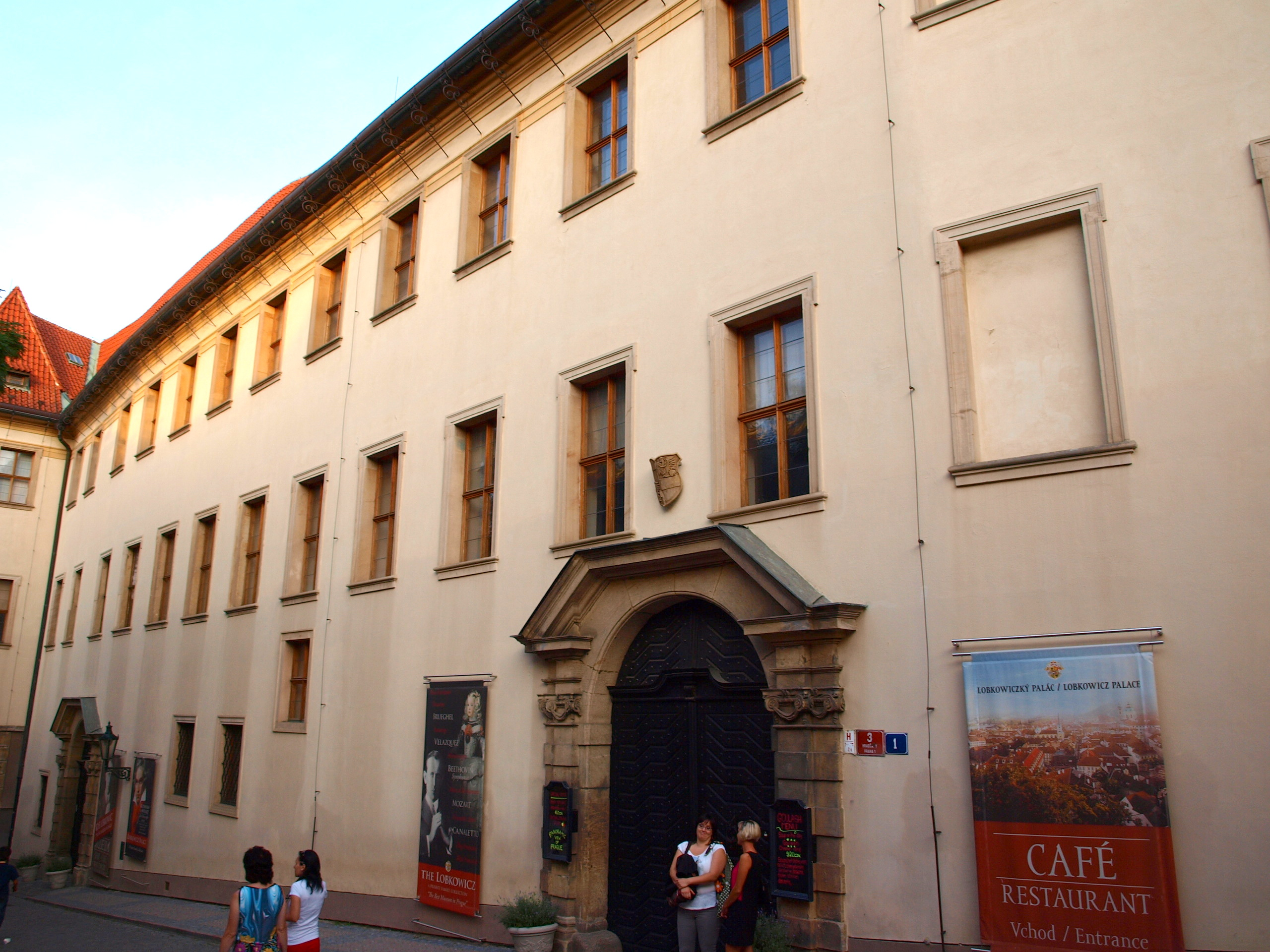
- The Lobkowicz Palace in Prague Castle
- Established: 25 April 1550
- Location: Prague, Czech Republic
- Collections: The Lobkowicz Collections
- Founder: Jaroslav of Pernstejn (1528–1569)
- Curator: Veronika Wolf
- Owner: William Lobkowicz
- Public transit access: Metro stop Malostranska (A Line), Tram stop Malostranska (# 5,12,18,20,22)
- Parking: N/A
- Website: www.lobkowicz.cz

The Lobkowicz Palace (Czech: Lobkowický palác) is a part of the Prague Castle complex in Prague, Czech Republic. It is the only privately owned building in the Prague Castle complex and houses the Lobkowicz Collections and Museum.

The palace was built in the second half of the 16th century by the Czech nobleman Jaroslav of Pernštejn (1528–1569) and completed by his brother, Vratislav of Pernštejn (1530–1582), the chancellor of the Czech Kingdom. It was opened to the public for the first time on 2 April 2007 as the Lobkowicz Palace Museum. Set in 22 galleries, the museum displays a selection of pieces from the Lobkowicz Collections, including works by artists such as Antonio Canaletto, Pieter Brueghel the Elder, Lucas Cranach the Elder, and Diego Velázquez, as well as decorative art, military and hunting paraphernalia, musical instruments, and original manuscripts and early prints of composers including Beethoven and Mozart.

== History ==
Lobkowicz Palace was built in the second half of the 16th century by the Czech nobleman Jaroslav of Pernštejn (1528-1569) and completed by his brother, Vratislav II of Pernštejn (1530–1582), the chancellor of the Czech Kingdom. Vratislav's wife, Maria Maximiliana Manrique de Lara y Mendoza, brought the Infant Jesus of Prague statue, thought to have healing powers, from her homeland of Spain to the Palace. The statue was later given by Vratislav and Maria Maximiliana's daughter, Polyxena (1566-1642), to the Church of Our Lady Victorious in Prague, where it remains on display as a popular tourist attraction. A replica of the Infant Jesus of Prague is on permanent display in the Lobkowicz Palace Museum.

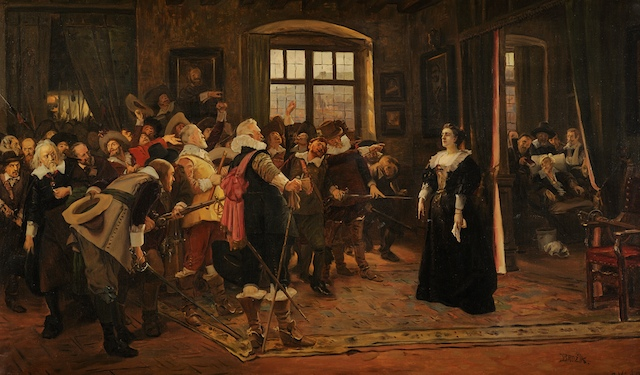
Polyxena, Princess Lobkowicz hiding the Emperor's emissaries, V. Slavata and J. Martinic, in the Lobkowicz Palace on 23 May 1618, Rudolf Vejrych after Václav Brožík

The Palace came into the Lobkowicz family through the marriage of Polyxena to Zdeněk Vojtěch, 1st Prince Lobkowicz (1568-1628). In 1618, Protestant rebels threw the Catholic Imperial Ministers from the windows of the Royal Palace at Prague Castle, known as the Second Defenestration of Prague. Surviving the fall, the ministers took refuge in Lobkowicz Palace, where they were protected from further assault by Polyxena.

Following the defeat of the Protestant faction at the Battle of White Mountain in 1620, the Catholic Lobkowicz family grew in influence and power for the next three centuries. Lobkowicz Palace took on a more formal, imperial role and functioned as the Prague residence when the family needed to be present at the seat of Bohemian power for political and ceremonial purposes. In the time of the 7th prince, Joseph Franz Maximilian Lobkowicz, the family preferred its Bohemian estates to the palace, and used it only occasionally for formal entertainments and concerts. Around 1811 it was used as a hospital for soldiers wounded in the war with Napoleon. With the exception of the 63 years (1939-2002) during which the property was confiscated and held by Nazi and then Communist authorities, the Palace has belonged to the Lobkowicz family.

After World War I, and the abolition of hereditary titles in 1918, Maximilian Lobkowicz (1888-1967), son of Ferdinand Zdenko, 10th Prince Lobkowicz (1858-1938), demonstrated his support for the fledgling First Republic of Czechoslovakia by making several rooms at the palace available to the government headed by Tomas G. Masaryk. In 1939, the occupying Nazi forces confiscated the Palace, along with all other Lobkowicz family properties. The Palace was returned in 1945, only to be seized again after the Communist takeover in 1948. For the next forty years, the Palace was used for a variety of purposes, including State offices and as a museum of Czech history.

After the Velvet Revolution of 1989 and the fall of the Communist government, President Václav Havel enacted a series of laws that allowed for the restitution of confiscated properties. Following a twelve-year restitution process, the palace returned to the ownership of the Lobkowicz family in 2002. On 2 April 2007, after four years of restoration and refurbishment, the palace was opened to the public for the first time as the Lobkowicz Palace Museum, home to one part of The Lobkowicz Collections. The 17th century baroque Concert Hall of the Lobkowicz Palace hosts regular concerts of classical music, and the premises are also used for weddings.

== Architecture ==
After the Thirty Years War, the Palace underwent a number of significant changes, particularly under Václav Eusebius, 2nd Prince Lobkowicz. He was responsible for the palace’s significant baroque alterations and some of its more lavishly decorated salons. Václav Eusebius redesigned the palace in the Italianate style. His design influence can be seen today in the Imperial Hall, whose walls are painted in fresco with trompe l'oeil statues of emperors surrounded by geometric designs, floral and other decorative motifs. Additional examples of the Italianate style are the Concert Hall and the Balcony Room, whose ceilings are adorned with elaborate painted stuccowork and frescoes by Fabián Václav Harovník.

In the 18th century, Joseph František Maximilian, 7th Prince Lobkowicz commissioned the reconstruction of the exterior of the Palace in preparation for the coronation at Prague Castle of Emperor Leopold II as King of Bohemia in 1791. The alterations included the addition of the palace's panoramic balconies. Despite the various alterations made through the years, remnants of original 16th-century murals and graffito work can still be seen in both of the interior courtyards.

== The Lobkowicz Collection ==
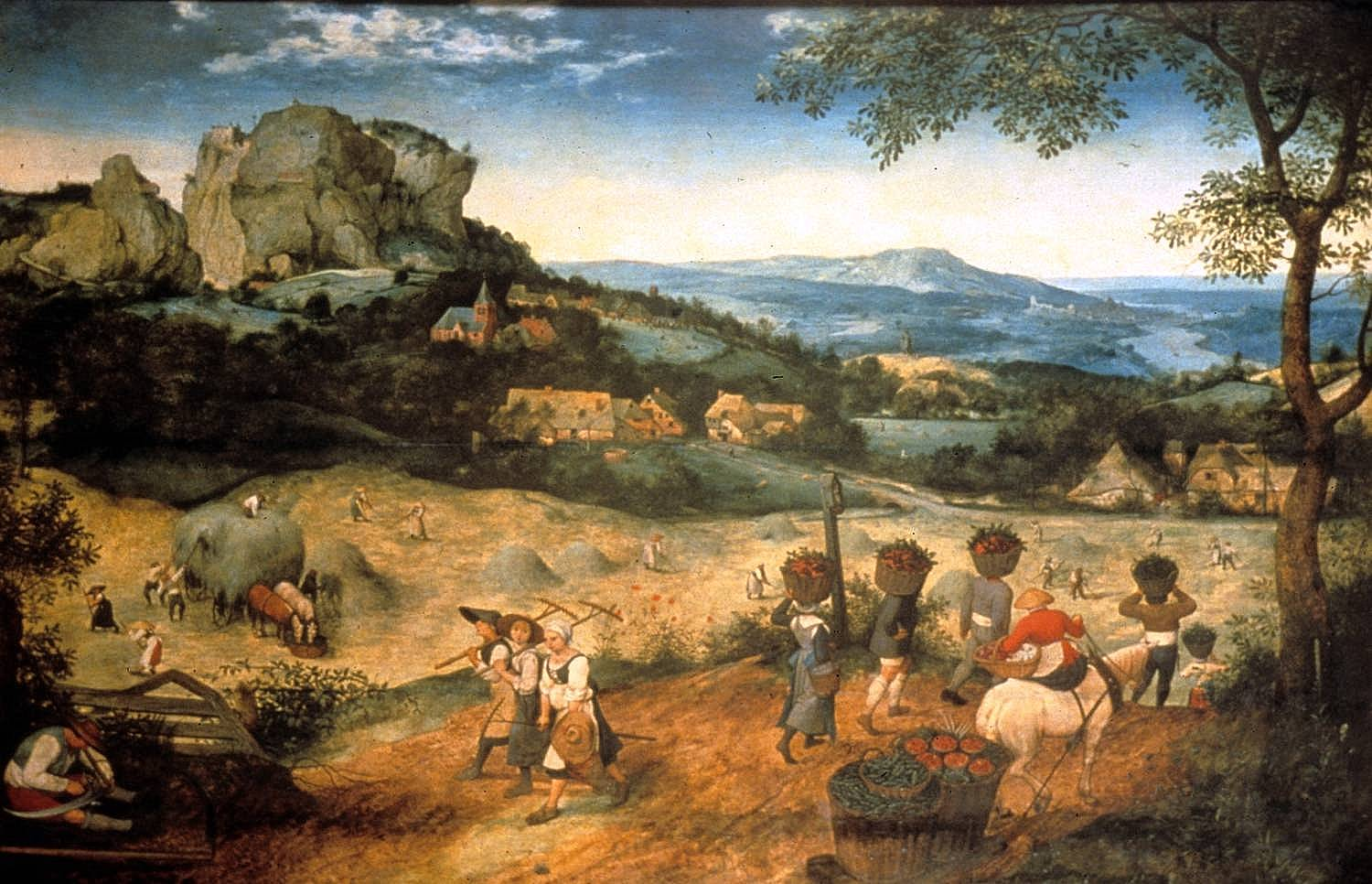
Haymaking, Pieter Brueghel the Elder, oil on panel, The Lobkowicz Collections

The oldest and largest privately owned art collection in the Czech Republic, the Lobkowicz Collection draws its significance from its comprehensive nature, reflecting the cultural, social, political and economic life of Central Europe for over seven centuries. In 1907, Max Dvořák, a prominent member of the Vienna School of Art History, created the first complete catalogue of the Collections. After the restitution laws in the early 1990s, the Lobkowicz family was able to reassemble most of the collection, subsequently making it available to the public for the first time.

=== Paintings ===
The Lobkowicz Collections comprise approximately 1,500 paintings, including famous works by artists including Pieter Brueghel the Elder, Pieter Brueghel the Younger, Jan Brueghel the Elder, Bellotto, Lucas Cranach the Elder, Lucas Cranach the Younger, Diego Velázquez, Peter Paul Rubens, Paolo Veronese and Canaletto. The collections also include: an extensive collection of Spanish portraits; Central European portraits by Hans von Aachen and the School of Prague; Dutch, Flemish and German genre paintings; and over 50 paintings and watercolors of Lobkowicz residences by Carl Robert Croll.

London: The River Thames With St. Paul's Cathedral On Lord Mayor's Day, Antonio Canaletto, oil on canvas, 1746, The Lobkowicz Collections

The three most prestigious artworks in the collection are The Hay Harvest (1565) by Pieter Brueghel the Elder, and two panoramic views of London by Canaletto. Other notable works include: Hygieia Nourishing the Sacred Serpent (c. 1614) by the Flemish master, Peter Paul Rubens; The Virgin and Child with Saints Barbara and Catherine (c. 1520) by Lucas Cranach the Elder; Christ and the Woman Taken in Adultery (c. 1530) by Lucas Cranach the Younger; Caritas Romana (early-mid 16th century) by Georg Pencz and smaller paintings such as A Village in Winter (c. 1600) by Pieter Brueghel the Younger and St. Martin Dividing his Cloak (1611) by Jan Brueghel the Elder. Venetian painting of the 16th century is represented by Paolo Veronese's David with the Head of Goliath (1575).

The Italian baroque collection includes a prayerful Madonna by Giovanni Battista Salvi, and paintings by Francesco del Cairo, Antonio Zanchi and Giovanni Paolo Pannini. The principal Lobkowicz residences and estates—Roudnice nad Labem, Nelahozeves, Jezeří and Bílina—are depicted in oils and watercolors, commissioned from the 19th-century German painter Carl Robert Croll.

Margarita Teresa, Infanta of Spain, Diego Velázquez (attributed), oil on canvas, c. 1655, The Lobkowicz Collections

The portraits contained in The Collections reflect the Lobkowicz family's participation in European political and cultural life. The collection includes full-length Spanish portraits of Pernstejns, Lobkowiczes, Rožmberks and related members of European and ruling Habsburg dynasties by painters such as Alonso Sánchez Coello, Juan Pantoja de la Cruz, Jacob Seisenegger and Hans Krell. Among the 17th and the 18th century works in the collection is the Spanish Infanta Margarita Theresa (c. 1655), attributed to Diego Velázquez. Later portraits of members of the Lobkowicz family are by Viennese portraitists of the 19th century such as Franz Schrotzberg and Friedrich von Amerling.

The collection of paintings is accompanied by an extensive collection of graphics and drawings, including a set of engravings of Rome by Giovanni Battista Piranesi.

=== Decorative arts ===
While not as well known as the paintings, books and music associated with the Lobkowiczes, decorative and sacred arts objects, dating from the 13th through the 20th centuries, form a significant part of The Collections.

During the Nazi occupation of Czechoslovakia and the later period of Communist rule, the private chapels in the family’s principal residences were desecrated and their contents dispersed. Important artefacts survived, including a 12th-century reliquary cross of rock crystal and gilded copper. The gold reliquary head of a female saint, possibly St. Ursula, dated c. 1300 and known as the Jezeri Bust, was found in a trunk of theatrical props. It is now on display in the Lobkowicz Palace.

Late-Renaissance and early-baroque ceramics from Italy feature prominently in the collections. Several pieces of colorful Deruta ware are considered to be among the earliest Italian ceramics brought back to Bohemia. Ordered during a trip to Italy in 1551, the pieces are colourfully decorated with an image of a bull, which was the Pernstejn family crest.

By the late 17th century, Chinese hard-paste porcelain had become the great obsession of European rulers and aristocrats. The Dutch workshops at Delft created tin-glazed earthenware that was an early European imitation of the expensive Chinese ware. Around 1680 when he was Imperial Envoy to the Netherlands, Wenzel Ferdinand, Count Lobkowicz of Bilina, commissioned a personalized work, designed with intricate overlapping letters of his initials WL. With 150 pieces, the set is the largest surviving Delft dinner service. A selection of pieces are on display at the Lobkowicz Palace Museum. In the spring of 2000, over sixty pieces from this service were lent to the Rijksmuseum, Amsterdam, to be displayed as part of the "Glory of the Golden Age" exhibition.

The Meissen factory outside Dresden discovered how to produce hard-paste porcelain in the first decade of the 18th century, for the first time outside of Asia. As a result of the factory’s proximity to the Lobkowicz landholdings and castles, 18th and 19th century examples of these porcelain works are prevalent in the collections, ranging from the earlier delicate chinoiserie motifs to the more traditional European elements and designs with fruits and flowers.

Some of the cabinetmaking and marquetry in the Collections come from the Eger craftsmen who worked in Western Bohemia in the 17th century. Several Eger jewelry cabinets are considered among the finest ever produced. Other pieces include caskets, tables and games boards, which are lavishly inlaid with ivory, mother-of-pearl and tortoiseshell, depicting landscapes, animals and classical motifs.

=== Music ===
The Music Archive of the Lobkowicz Collection holds over 5,000 items. Originally housed in The Lobkowicz Library at the principal family seat of Roudnice Castle, the entire archive was confiscated, first by the Nazis in 1941, and again by the Communist regime, which sent it to the Czech Museum of Music. In October 1998, the Music Archive was returned to the family in its entirety and moved to Nelahozeves Castle under the auspices of the Roudnice-Lobkowicz Foundation.

Cover of 3rd symphony Eroica - dedicated to 7th prince Lobkowicz, The Lobkowicz Collections

The Music Archive, established by Ferdinand August, 3rd Prince of Lobkowicz, was assembled over three centuries by principal members of the family who were not only enthusiastic collectors, but patrons of the arts and also often talented performers. The Music Archive contains works by over five hundred composers and musicians. These include a rare collection of late 17th- and early 18th-century lute, mandolin and guitar scores. This collection, regarded as the world’s largest private collection of baroque music for plucked instruments, has a particularly extensive collection of works by French composers, including Denis Gaultier and Ennemond Gaultier, Jacques de Saint-Luc, Charles Mouton, and Jacques Gallot. The Music Archive is most noted, however, for its late 18th- and early 19th-century collection, including works by Handel, Mozart, Haydn and Beethoven, including Beethoven’s Third (Eroica), Fourth and Fifth symphonies, and Mozart’s hand written re-orchestration of Handel’s Messiah.

Philip Hyacinth, 4th Prince of Lobkowicz, and his second wife, Anna Wilhelmina Althan, were both distinguished lutenists and the prince was an accomplished composer as well. Both were taught by some of the finest contemporary lutenists, including Sylvius Leopold Weiss and Andreas Bohr, and their fine period instruments remain part of the collections. Their son, Ferdinand Philip, the sixth prince, played the glass harmonica and championed the son of one of the family's foresters, the opera composer Christoph Willibald Gluck.

The family member who had the greatest impact on the history of Western music, however, was the 7th prince, Joseph Franz Maximilian. A talented singer, violinist and perhaps cellist, the 7th prince was a major patron of Beethoven, who dedicated his Third (Eroica), Fifth, and Sixth (Pastoral) symphonies to the Prince, as well as other works. It was the annual stipend provided by the Prince (and continued by his son until the composer’s death), Archduke Rudolf and Prince Ferdinand Kinsky, that allowed Beethoven the freedom to compose without dependence on commissions and time-consuming teaching.

In addition to the manuscripts and printed music, the collections include musical instruments from house orchestras that performed in the various family residences at Jezeří and Roudnice nad Labem in Northern Bohemia, as well as in Vienna. Also on display are lutes from the 16th and 17th centuries by Maler, Tieffenbrucker and Unverdorben; a 17th-century guitar; violins of Italian, German and Czech origin (Gasparo da Salo, Jacob Stainer, Eberle, Hellmer, Rauch); contrabasses from Edlinger and Jacob Stainer; Guarneri and Kulik violoncelli; 18th-century Viennese wind instruments and a pair of copper martial kettledrums. A rare item in the collection is a suite of six elaborately decorated silver trumpets made in 1716 by Michael Leichamschneider of Vienna – one of only two documented sets in existence.

The Nelahozeves Castle Music Room displays a spinet dated 1799 by imperial court instrument maker Engelbert Klingler, a contrabass by Anton Posch and other string instruments as well as two pairs of copper and bronze kettledrums.

=== Military and hunting equipment ===
Hunting was an important activity for Central European nobility from the late Renaissance period onwards, and all of the major Lobkowicz properties served as venues for hunting. Bearing witness to these hunting parties and their participants are hundreds of mounted trophies in the Lobkowicz Collections, dating from the 18th to the early 20th centuries. The social aspects of the hunt are also reflected in the numerous paintings and graphics by local artists in the collection, among them pictures of favourite horses, dogs and trophies. The central part of the hunting-related exhibitions, however, is the firearms themselves, which are displayed in two armoury rooms at Lobkowicz Palace, while further items from the collection are held at Nelahozeves Castle.

The majority of these rifles and pistols were produced locally for the family between 1650 and 1750, by the 17th-century Prague workshops of Adam Brand, Paul Ignatius Poser, the Neireiter family and Leopold Becher, as well as Roudnice craftsmen such as Johannes Lackner and Adel Friedrich during the mid-18th century. These exhibits reflect the patronage of the Lobkowicz family, who provided the gun makers with large orders for guns for many centuries.

The collection features a group of identical flintlock rifles produced for the Lobkowicz Militia in the 18th century, one of the largest collections of such items. Additional weapons came from Silesia, while the most elaborate 18th-century rifles and pistols (some in the Turkish manner) with mother-of-pearl inlay were produced in Vienna. Goldsmiths and silversmiths specializing in inlay were employed to decorate guns, rifles, crossbows and powder flasks of the finest quality.

The palace housed an exhibition of the work Illustrated geography and history of Bohemia by Bavarian cartographer Mauritius Vogt. The exhibition ran until 31 May 2015.

== Lobkowicz Collections o.p.s. ==
In 1994, a non-profit organisation, Lobkowicz Collections o.p.s. (previously the Roudnice Lobkowicz Foundation), was established to curate and maintain the Lobkowicz Collection, recently returned to the family after the Velvet Revolution. The organisation also works to provide access to the art, music and literature contained in the collection to academic researchers and the general public. Lobkowicz Collections o.p.s. has co-ordinated the installation of the collections at both Lobkowicz Palace and Nelahozeves Castle.

The organisation's responsibilities include:

- overseeing the preservation and installation of the objects in The Collections
- developing education programs for students
- promoting and facilitating academic research around The Collections
- administering loans to other cultural institutions
- curating exhibitions of works included in the collections for the public

Significant restoration projects include the restoration of Peter Paul Rubens’ Hygieia Nourishing the Sacred Serpent, restored by Hubert von Sonnenburg of the Metropolitan Museum of Art. This project was funded by the [American Friends for the Preservation of Czech Culture (AFPCC).

Lobkowicz Collections o.p.s. also administers lending of artworks to exhibitions. Since 1993, over 200 works of art have been lent to museums in the Czech Republic and abroad, including the Metropolitan Museum of Art in New York, the National Gallery of Art in Washington DC, the Royal Academy of Art in London and the Rijksmuseum in Amsterdam.

== See also ==
- Palais Lobkowitz, Vienna
- Lobkowicz family
