= Roudnice Lobkowicz Library =

Coordinates: 50.261°N 14.301°E

The Roudnice Lobkowicz Library (Czech: Roudnická lobkowiczká knihovna) is a large private collection of books kept at Nelahozeves Castle, 35 km north of Prague, Czech Republic. The library belongs to the Lobkowicz family, a noble dynasty of Bohemia. Together with the family's collection of artworks, music, and other valuable assets, the library forms the Lobkowicz Collection, most of which is held in the Lobkowicz Palace, part of the Prague Castle complex. The library comprises about 65,000 volumes – including 679 manuscripts (114 of them dating to the Middle Ages) and 730 incunabula (early books printed prior to 1501). It is the largest castle library in the Czech Republic.

== Contents ==
There are a large number of first editions, in subjects ranging from history, geography, medicine and the natural sciences, to architecture, literature, theology and law. Texts are predominantly in French, German and Latin – but there are also books in Spanish, Italian, Czech, Greek, Hebrew and other languages. The collection of rare books printed in Spanish is the largest in the country. The oldest complete codex dates to the 10th century, and a four-page fragment of the Gospel of Mark is even older, dating to the late 8th or early 9th century. The Music Archive contains more than 5,000 printed editions and manuscripts of 17th-, 18th- and 19th-century scores, also performing parts, libretti, sheet music, and baroque tablatures for plucked instruments.

The Library grew over many centuries, incorporating the libraries of both close and distant relations; the acquisition of the libraries of other aristocrats who fell from favor in the various wars in Central Europe in the 17th century; the purchase of the working libraries of important political, scientific or cultural figures; as well as through regular purchases and commissions.

== Early History of the Library ==
The earliest section is the library of Bohuslav Hassenstein of Lobkowicz, one of the most prominent Latin Humanists of 15th-century Central Europe. With the help of friends and a network of agents, Hassenstein amassed a collection remarkable in its day for its size and scientific approach to collecting and cataloguing. This library was dominated by volumes of classical and humanist philosophy and literature, in Latin, the lingua franca of scholars. Thirty volumes represent nearly half of all the books printed in Greek characters in Europe at that time. The reputation of the collection was such that Hassenstein’s heirs received requests for loans from Martin Luther and Philip Melanchthon. About three-quarters of the Hassenstein library survives, and the majority of it in the Lobkowicz Library.

A more systematic development of the family collections was started in the 17th century by Zdeněk Vojtěch, 1st Prince Lobkowicz, who had acquired the Hassenstein library after it was confiscated from his relation, Jiří of Lobkowicz (1551-1607), who had been charged with plotting against Emperor Rudolf II. After the uprising of the Protestant Estates in 1620, the 1st Prince and his wife, Polyxena (1566-1642) had already succeeded in purchasing entire libraries forfeited by various Protestant aristocratic houses. Other personal libraries were also acquired, including the rare collection of books printed in Spain that came to the country with Polyxena’s Spanish mother, Maria Manrique de Lara y Mendoza (1538-1608). In this period the library was stored in the palace, then known as Pernštejn Palace, but in 1657 it was moved by the 2nd Prince, Václav Eusebius, to Roudnice Castle, where it remained – added to by succeeding generations – until the Second World War. It is for this reason that the library is known as the Roudnice Lobkowicz Library, even though it is currently kept at Nelahozeves Castle.

Ferdinand August (1655-1715), 3rd Prince Lobkowicz, held prestigious offices at the Imperial Diet in Regensburg, and acquired books from the important printing centers in Germany. Documentation exists for hundreds of purchases each year as well as generous payments to bookbinders. His grandson, Ferdinand Philip (1724-1784), 6th Prince Lobkowicz, was a voracious collector of books during his travels throughout Europe. The library was further augmented by collections acquired through inheritance, or marriage into other aristocratic families.

The earliest classification system applied to the library was established under Václav Eusebius. After 1777, a permanent librarian was always in residence. Ferdinand Josef, 8th Prince (1797-1868) and Mořic, 9th Prince (1831-1903), authorized a complete reorganization of the library that classified items according to subject in a new 10-volume systematic catalogue and a 20-volume alphabetical catalogue. Imposing bookcases were also made to house the library.

== Recent history ==
The library was confiscated by the Nazis in 1942. The bookcases were broken up and the ruined spaces turned into the communal latrines for the SS training centre that occupied the castle. The books themselves passed to the administrative care of the University Library of Prague. After the Communist takeover in 1948, the collections remained in a state depository, from which volumes and manuscripts were dispersed to different depositories and libraries throughout Bohemia over the next decades. During this time only a very limited number of volumes were available to the public or academic researchers.

In 1992, the library was returned to the Lobkowicz family. Shortly thereafter, a private donor made a charitable contribution to re-establish the collection as a working library, based on its original classification and composition, to enable the volumes to be used by scholars in accordance with internationally accepted standards of security and conservation. A new space to house the library in its entirety was prepared at Nelahozeves Castle. The books were again organized according to the order established in the original 19th-century catalogue, a conservation plan for the collection was completed, and a research program was established. As a result, the library is now open, by prior appointment, to students, scholars and special groups.

A temporary book exhibition at the palace from 2 July to 30 November 2014 presented rare early editions of English oratorios by George Frideric Handel. The Lobkowicz Library houses a collection of more than twenty volumes of first London editions of Handel's grand oratorios, including a printed score of Esther, regarded as the first large oratorio in English, and a score of the oratorio Deborah, composed in 1733 in response to the success of Esther. Though first editions of the works, both volumes were published posthumously, in 1783 and 1784 respectively. The editions printed by Wright & Wilkinson include a copperplate portrait of Handel by renowned Dutch engraver Jacob Houbraken.

The addition of Handel's printed oratorios to the library was thought to be associated with journeys by Ferdinand Philipp, 6th Prince Lobkowicz (1724–1784) to England. However, more recent research suggests that the rare prints were actually part of the collection of Viennese music patron Gottfried van Swieten. The volumes were most likely purchased together with manuscript copies of Handel's works, including part of the score of the oratorio Messiah, with autograph alterations by Mozart, on display as part of the permanent exhibition.

== See also ==
- Lobkowicz Palace
- List of libraries in the Czech Republic
