= Roudnice nad Labem =

Town in Ústí nad Labem Region, Czech Republic

- Town
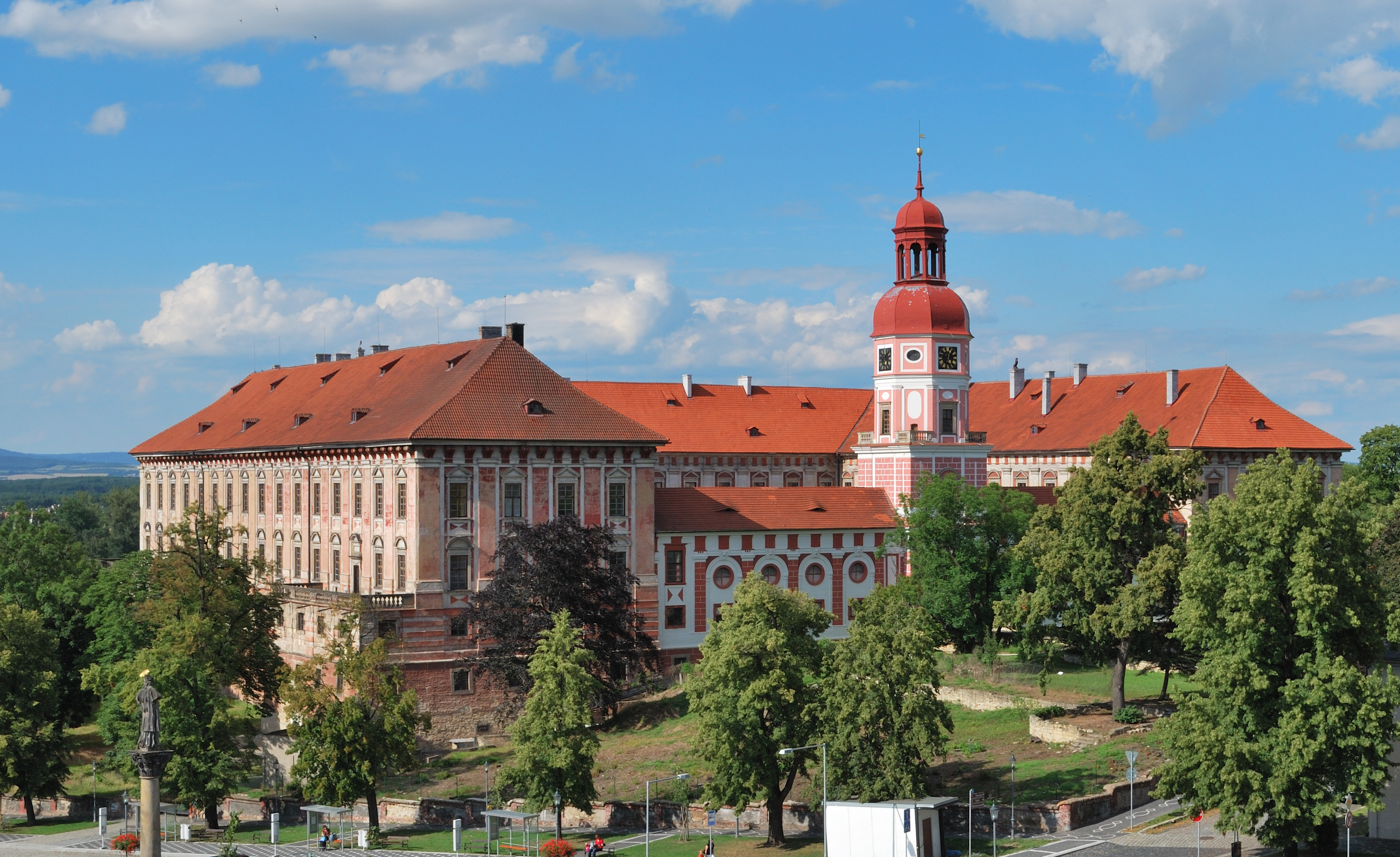
- Roudnice Castle

- Flag Coat of arms

- Location in the Czech Republic
- Coordinates: 50°25′25″N 14°15′14″E
- Country: Czech Republic
- Region: Ústí nad Labem
- District: Litoměřice
- First mentioned: 1167

Government
  - Mayor: František Padělek

Area
  - Total: 16.68 km^{2} (6.44 sq mi)
- Elevation: 195 m (640 ft)

Population (2026-01-01)
  - Total: 12,561
  - Density: 753.1/km^{2} (1,950/sq mi)
- Time zone: UTC+1 (CET)
  - Summer (DST): UTC+2 (CEST)
- Postal code: 413 01
- Website: www.roudnicenl.cz

Roudnice nad Labem (Czech pronunciation: [ˈroudɲɪtsɛ ˈnad labɛm]; German: Raudnitz an der Elbe) is a town in Litoměřice District in the Ústí nad Labem Region of the Czech Republic. It has about 13,000 inhabitants. The town is located on the left bank of the Elbe River in the Lower Ohře Table.

Roudnice nad Labem was probably founded in the 12th century and became a town in the 13th century. The historic town centre is well preserved and is protected as an urban monument zone. The main landmark is the Roudnice Castle, a Baroque building with late Romanesque origin.

== Administrative division ==
Roudnice nad Labem consists of two municipal parts (in brackets population according to the 2021 census):

- Roudnice nad Labem (11,446)
- Podlusky (926)

== Etymology ==
The initial names Rúdnik and Rúdnica probably come from the iron water of a nearby spring (ruda = 'ore').

== Geography ==
Roudnice nad Labem is located about 15 kilometres (9 mi) southeast of Litoměřice and 37 km (23 mi) north of Prague. It lies in the Lower Ohře Table, in the Polabí lowlands. The highest point is on the hill Hostěraz at 265 m (869 ft) above sea level. The town is situated on the left bank of the Elbe River, which forms the northern municipal border.

== History ==
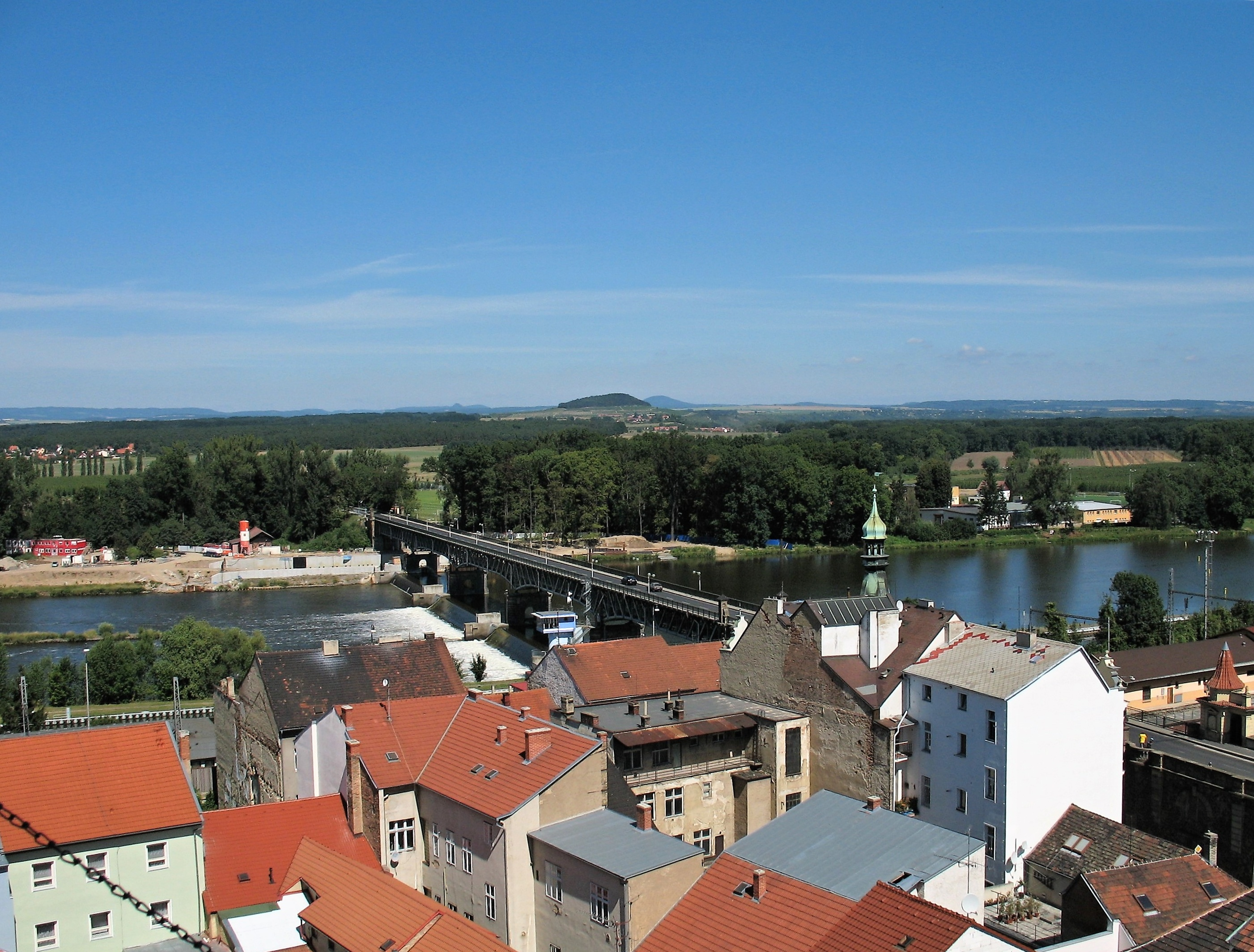
Bridge over the Elbe

Roudnice nad Labem is one of the oldest Czech towns. The first written mentions of Roudnice are from 1167 and 1176, but archaeological excavations in the area confirm existence of a prehistoric settlement. The market settlement quickly became economically important due to its location on the Lusatian road, and in the 13th century, it received town status.

In the 12th century, a Romanesque castle was built, used as the summer residence of archbishops and bishops.

In 1333, Bishop John IV of Dražice ordered that a bridge be built over the Elbe. It was the first stone bridge over the Elbe and the third stone bridge in Bohemia. The bridge was completed in 1340.

At the end of the 14th century, the New Town of Roudnice nad Labem (encompassing today's squares of Náměstí Jana z Dražic and Husovo náměstí) was built and, along with the Old Town of Roudnice nad Labem, surrounded by walls. In 1421, during the Hussite Wars, Roudnice nad Labem was conquered by Jan Žižka. During the Hussite invasions, the local monastery was destroyed and would never be rebuilt. After the Hussite Wars, the town was sold several times, which did not benefit its development. In 1603, it was acquired by the Lobkowicz family and it remained under their control until 1945. During their rule, the town was rebuilt and expanded. During the Thirty Years' War, Roudnice nad Labem was burned down and demolished by the Swedish army.

In the 19th century, Roudnice nad Labem became the industrial and economical centre of the Podřipsko region, due to several new factories and the railway from Prague to Dresden. Until 1918, the town was part of Austria-Hungary, in the district of the same name, one of the 94 Bezirkshauptmannschaften in Bohemia.

The first football match in Austria-Hungary and in the Czech lands took place on the islet in the middle of the Elbe, located within the town limits, in 1887 (in 1892, according to some sources). In 1910, the old stone bridge was rebuilt into a new steel road bridge.

== Demographics ==
Historical population

| Year | Pop. | ±% |
|---|---|---|
| 1869 | 5,373 | — |
| 1880 | 6,435 | +19.8% |
| 1890 | 7,187 | +11.7% |
| 1900 | 8,723 | +21.4% |
| 1910 | 10,383 | +19.0% |

| Year | Pop. | ±% |
|---|---|---|
| 1921 | 10,022 | −3.5% |
| 1930 | 10,399 | +3.8% |
| 1950 | 9,347 | −10.1% |
| 1961 | 10,541 | +12.8% |
| 1970 | 11,155 | +5.8% |

| Year | Pop. | ±% |
|---|---|---|
| 1980 | 13,956 | +25.1% |
| 1991 | 13,562 | −2.8% |
| 2001 | 13,132 | −3.2% |
| 2011 | 12,915 | −1.7% |
| 2021 | 12,372 | −4.2% |

Source: Censuses

== Transport ==
The D8 motorway from Prague to Ústí nad Labem runs along the western municipal border.

Roudnice nad Labem is located on the intraregional railway line Prague–Děčín. It is also the starting point of a local line to Bříza with four stops within the town.

== Education ==
There are four high schools in Roudnice nad Labem: Gymnasium Roudnice nad Labem, Vocational School and Training Centre, Podřipská Private Vocational School and Training Centre, and Higher Vocational School and Secondary Vocational School, which also offers higher education. There are also five primary schools, including one special school, and a primary art school.

== Sport ==
The town has a swimming pool, an ice hockey arena, and football and athletic stadiums. Roudnice Airport is located near the southwestern edge of the town and hosts the Memorial Air Show every other year.

== Sights ==
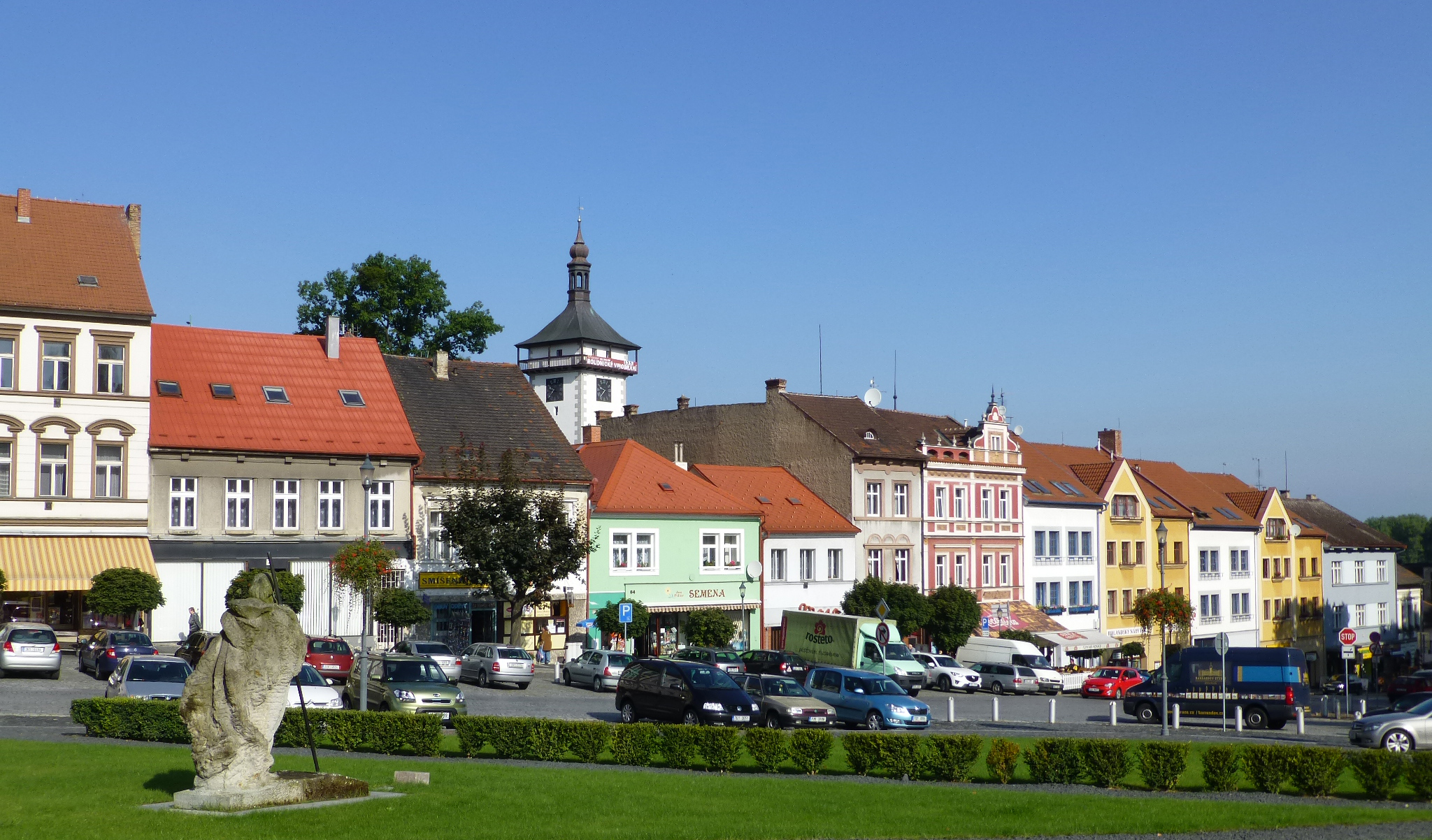
Karlovo námšstí with the Watchtower in the background

The historic centre is made up of the castle complex and of the squares Karlovo náměstí, Husovo náměstí, Purkyňovo náměstí and Náměstí Jana z Dražic. The town hall is located on Karlovo náměstí. It is a pseudo-Renaissance building from 1869.

The Gothic stone watchtower is the only preserved remnant of the Old Town's fortifications. It is open to the public as a lookout tower.

The church complex is formed of the Church of the Nativity of the Virgin Mary and the Augustinian monastery. The monastery was built in 1333–1353. The church is a typical Czech Gothic building from the first half of the 14th century. The iron spring after which the town got its name is located there.

=== Roudnice Castle ===
Roudnice Castle was built in the 12th century by Prague bishops to protect an important trade route from Prague to Upper Lusatia along the Elbe. In the 14th and 15th centuries, it was rebuilt in the Gothic style and became a popular summer residence for Prague bishops. There is a common misconception that Jan Hus was ordained as a priest there.

In 1421, the Catholic Church sold the castle to noble Jan Smiřický who renovated it again. King George of Poděbrady captured Roudnice from Smiřický in 1467. It passed into the ownership of William of Rosenberg, the Supreme Burgrave and one of the wealthiest men in Bohemia. After Rosenberg's death, his widow Polyxena of Pernštejn married Zdeněk Vojtěch Popel of Lobkowicz, High Chancellor of Bohemia and later first Prince of Lobkowicz, bringing Roudnice into the Lobkowicz family possessions.

In 1652, their son, Václav Eusebius, embarked upon an ambitious project to transform the castle into an early Baroque palace. From 1657 until World War II, the Lobkowicz Collection's library was stored in Roudnice Castle, leading to the library being named the Roudnice Lobkowicz Library. Václav Eusebius of Lobkowicz hired two Italian architects, Francesco Caratti and Antonio della Porta, to completely renovate Roudnice Castle. Between 1652 and 1684, they demolished most of the original structure, creating a 200-room Baroque residence that included a clock tower, a chapel decorated with elaborate frescoes, a theatre, and large formal gardens. For two and a half centuries Roudnice served as a repository for the Lobkowicz family's collections of artwork, religious objects, musical instruments, and books and manuscripts.

The castle was confiscated by the Communist government in 1948; the Czechoslovak People's Army used the building for the Vít Nejedlý military music school, as well as for administrative offices. After 1989, the castle was restored to the Lobkowicz family, who continued to rent the castle to the school until it closed in 2008. In 2009, the castle underwent major renovations and was opened to the public.

The Castle Riding Hall was built in the 17th century by Antonio della Porta. Today it houses the Gallery of Modern Art.

== Notable people ==
- Cola di Rienzo (1313–1354), Italian politician; imprisoned for a time at the Roudnice castle
- Abraham ben Saul Broda (c. 1640 – 1717), Rabbi in Roudnice
- Emanuele d'Astorga (1680–1736), Italian composer
- Seligmann Heller (1831–1890), Austrian poet
- Max Dvořák (1874–1921), art historian
- Arthur Breisky (1885–1910), writer
- Georg Wilhelm Pabst (1885–1967), Austrian film director and screenwriter
- Kurt Epstein (1904–1975), water polo player, survivor of the Holocaust
- Vladimír Černík (1917–2002), tennis player
- Svatopluk Beneš (1918–2007), actor
- Lenka Bradáčová (born 1973), lawyer
- Roman Týce (born 1977), footballer
- Pavlína Ščasná (born 1982), footballer
- Jana Komrsková (born 1983), artistic gymnast

== Twin towns – sister cities ==
Roudnice nad Labem is twinned with:

- Dessau-Roßlau, Germany
- Ruelle-sur-Touvre, France

== Gallery ==
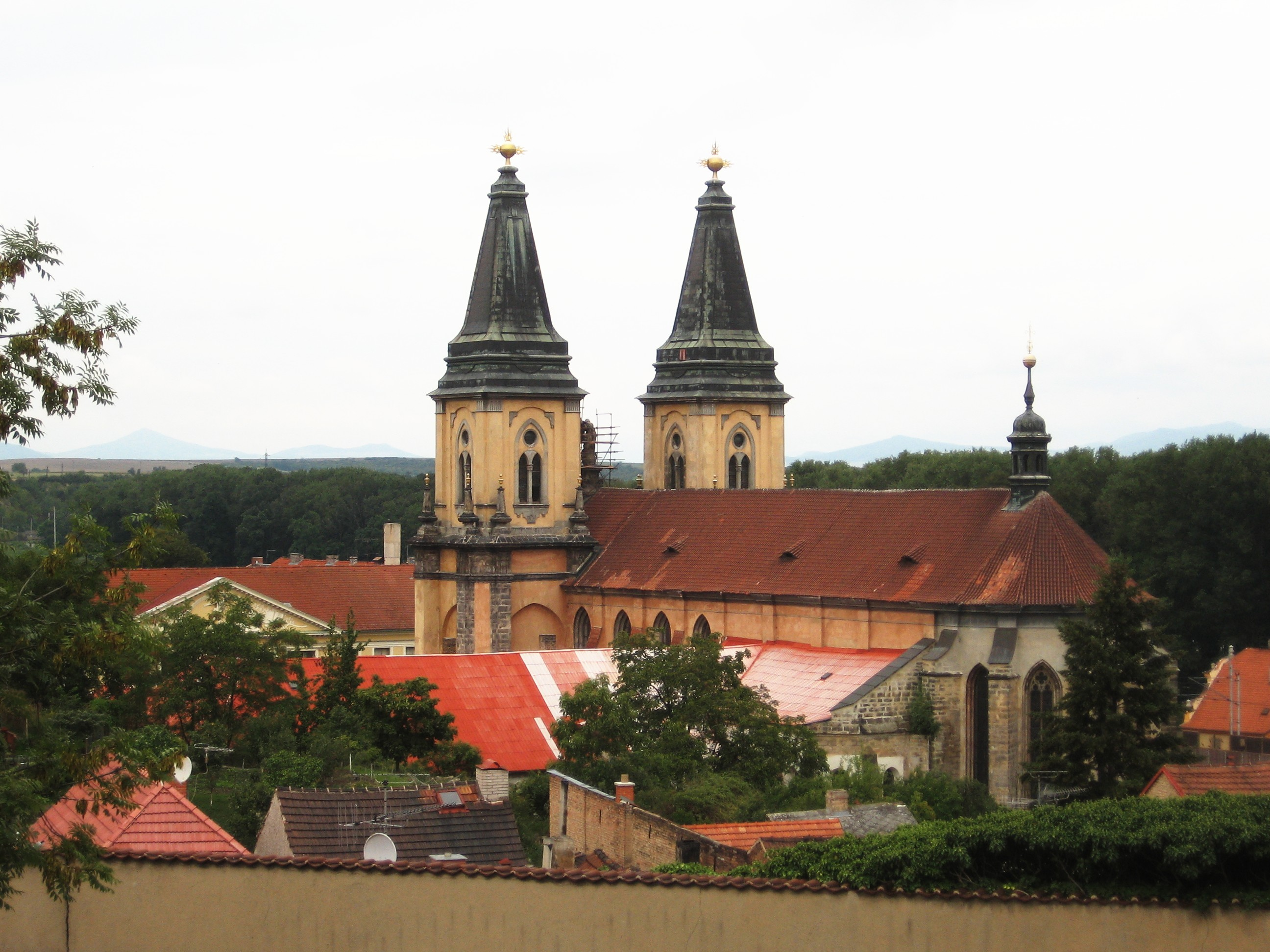
Church of the Nativity of the Virgin Mary

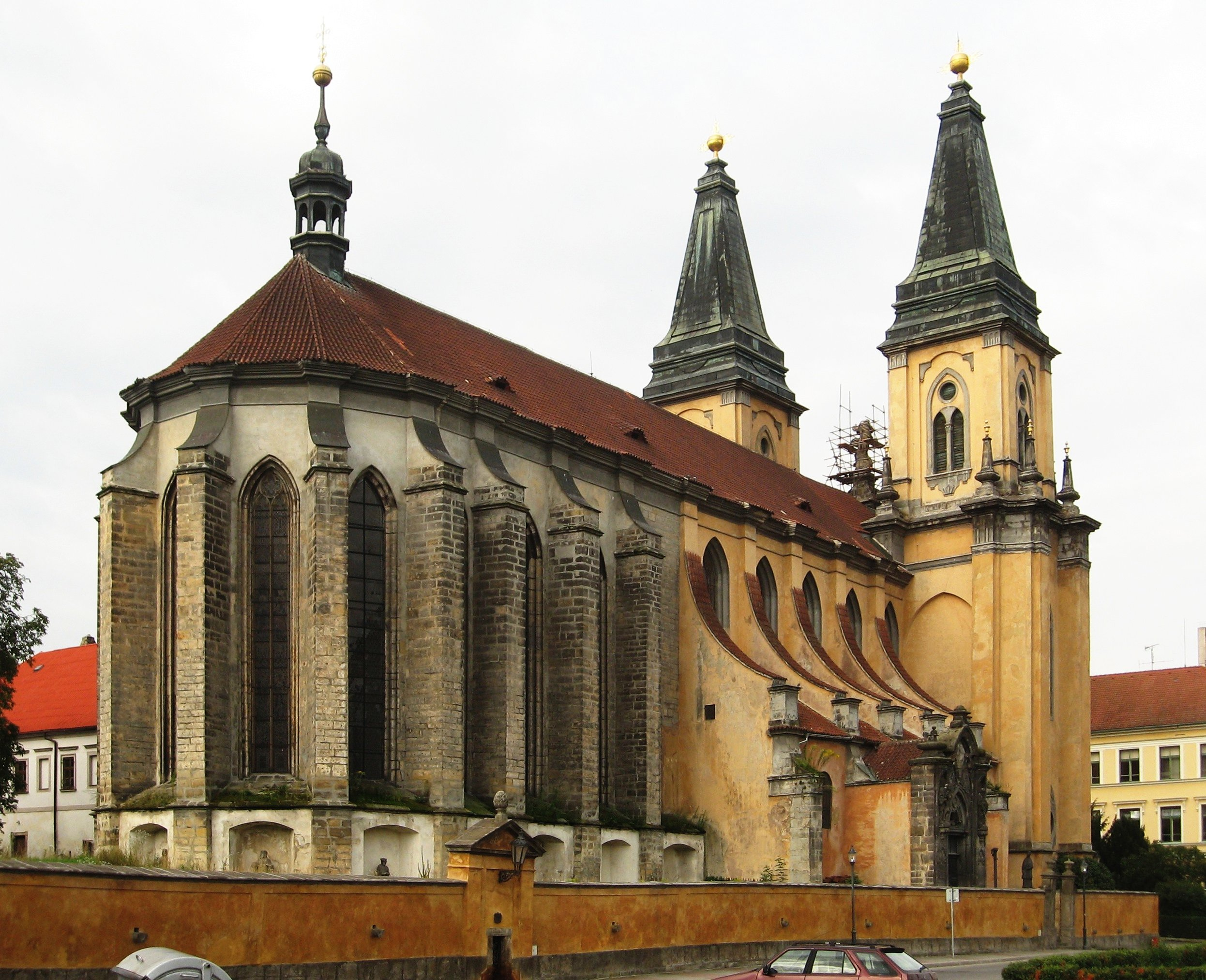
Church of the Nativity of the Virgin Mary

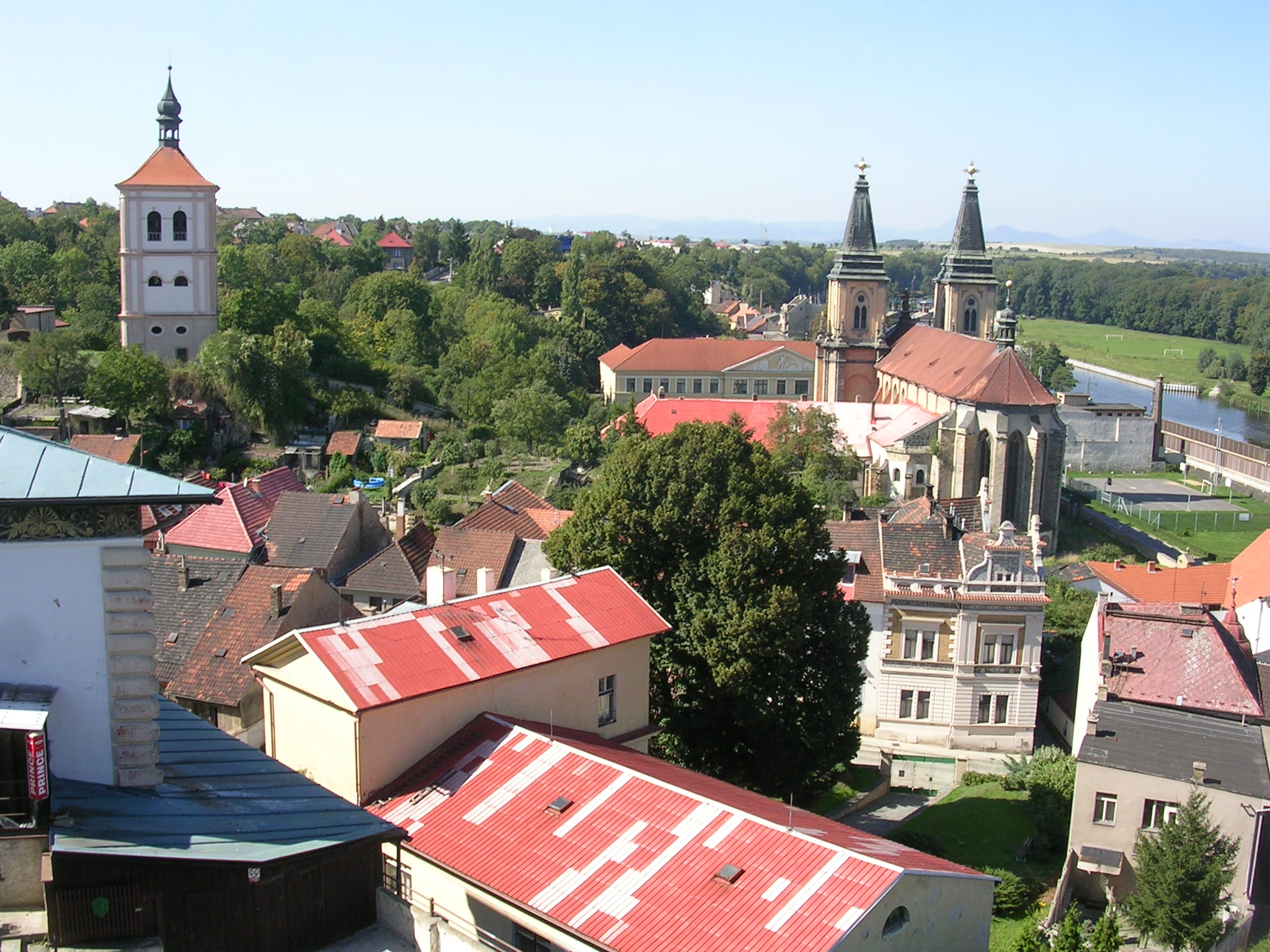
Belfry and church as seen from the Watchtower

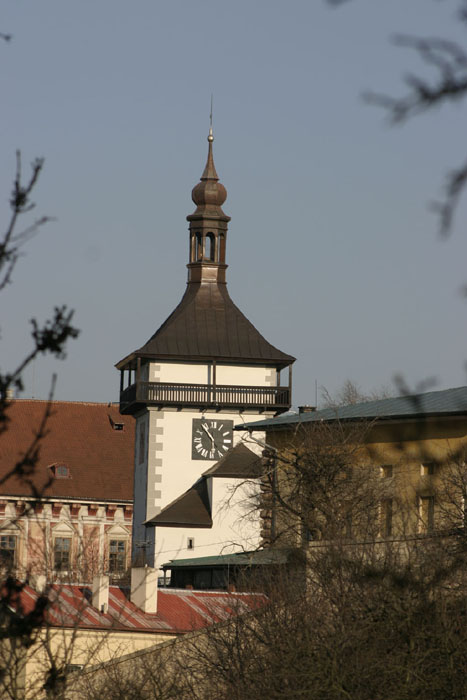
Watchtower

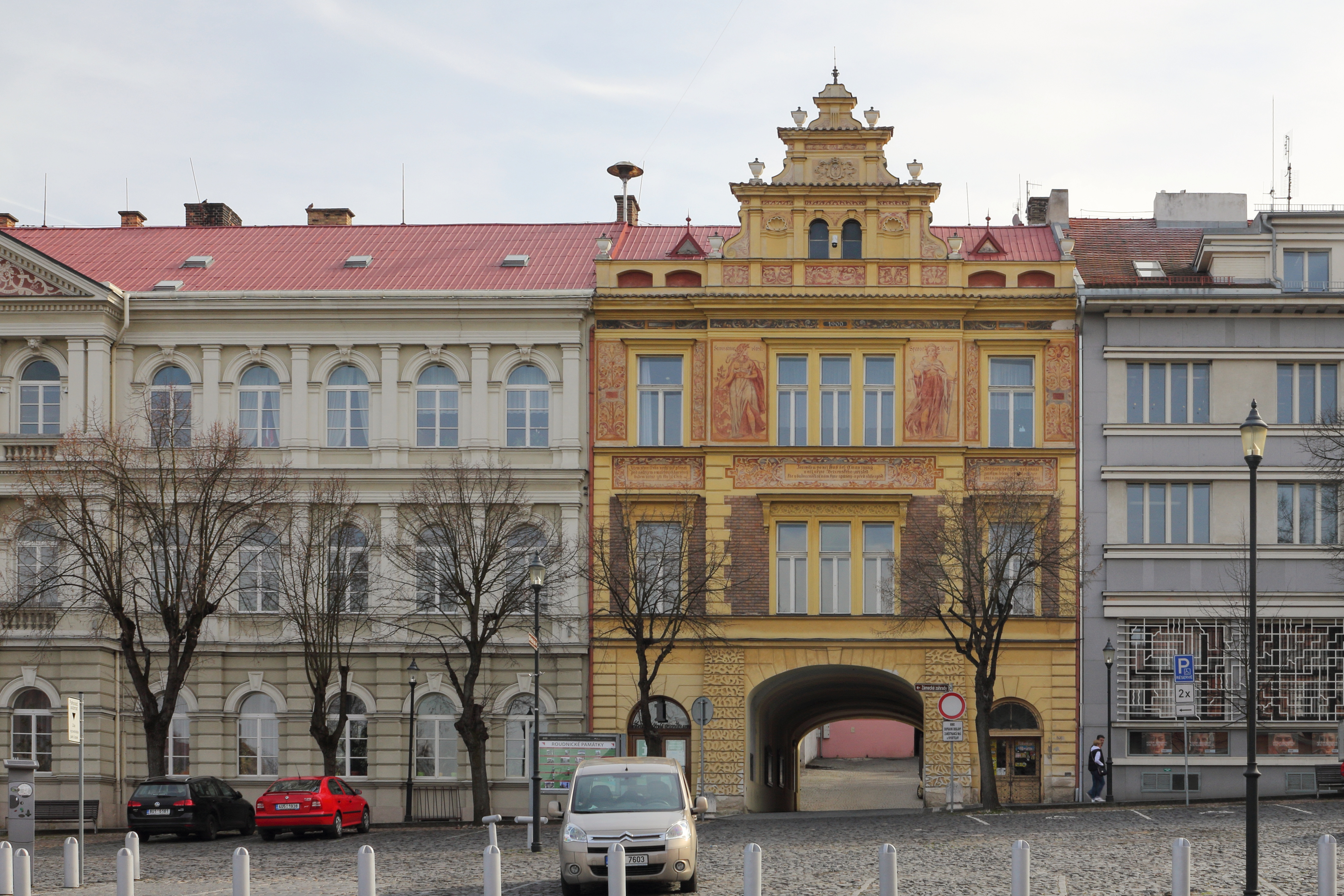
Town hall
