= Černěves =

- Municipality
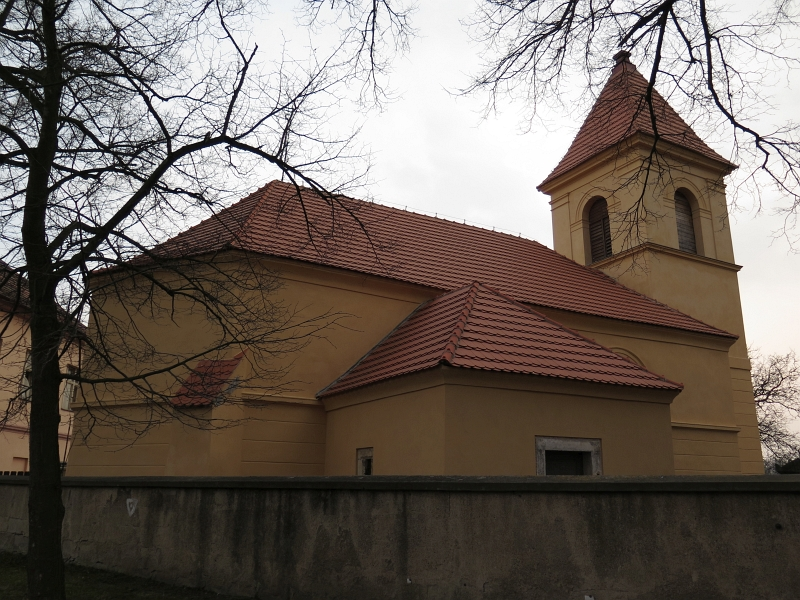
- Church of Saint Procopius

- Flag Coat of arms

- Location in the Czech Republic
- Coordinates: 50°27′16″N 14°14′36″E
- Country: Czech Republic
- Region: Ústí nad Labem
- District: Litoměřice
- First mentioned: 1233

Area
  - Total: 4.56 km^{2} (1.76 sq mi)
- Elevation: 153 m (502 ft)

Population (2026-01-01)
  - Total: 238
  - Density: 52.2/km^{2} (135/sq mi)
- Time zone: UTC+1 (CET)
  - Summer (DST): UTC+2 (CEST)
- Postal code: 413 01
- Website: www.cerneves.cz

Černěves is a municipality and village in Litoměřice District in the Ústí nad Labem Region of the Czech Republic. It has about 200 inhabitants.

Černěves lies approximately 13 kilometres (8 mi) south-east of Litoměřice, 27 km (17 mi) south-east of Ústí nad Labem, and 43 km (27 mi) north of Prague. It is about 3 km from Roudnice nad Labem.

== Demographics ==
Historical population
Year	Pop.	±%
1869	267	—
1880	259	−3.0%
1890	307	+18.5%
1900	347	+13.0%
1910	361	+4.0%
1921	359	−0.6%
1930	361	+0.6%
1950	244	−32.4%
1961	255	+4.5%
1970	232	−9.0%
1980	234	+0.9%
1991	212	−9.4%
2001	212	+0.0%
2011	209	−1.4%
2021	223	+6.7%
Source: Censuses
