= Mauritius Vogt =

Johann Georg Vogt (30 June 1669 – 17 August 1730), better known by his monastic name Mauritius Vogt, was a geographer, cartographer, musician, historian and a member of the Cistercian Order.

== Life ==
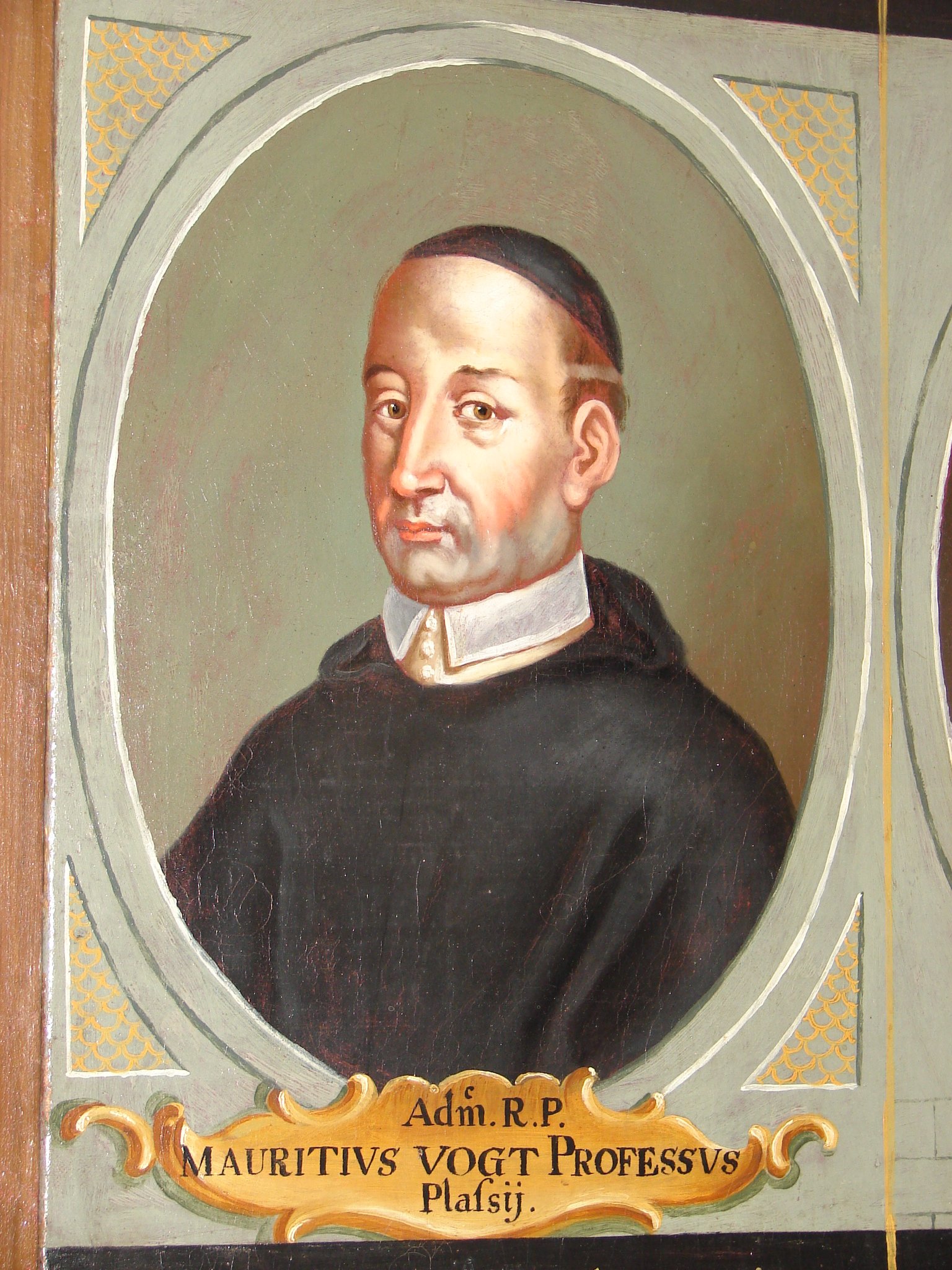
Mauritius Vogt

Vogt was born in Bad Königshofen, Bavaria. As a child he came with his father, a geodesist, to a monastery in Plasy in Western Bohemia. He was educated there, before studying Philosophy and Theology at Charles University in Prague. After graduating, he returned to Plasy and joined the order in 1692, taking the monastic name Mauritius. He was ordained as a priest in 1698. Apart from occasional trips to Italy and Germany to study music, and temporary stays at the residences of his aristocratic supporters, most of his later life is closely connected with the monastery in Plasy and its surroundings. His main focus while at the monastery was music; he was the organist and music director of the monastery, as well as a composer. In 1724 he was appointed Superior at Mariánská Týnice, a pilgrimage church connected to the monastery, and he held this position until his death.

== Works ==
Vogt's first published and most famous work entitled Das jetzlebende Königreich Böhmen, an introduction to the geography and history of Bohemia, was printed in 1712 in Frankfurt am Main and Leipzig. The book became celebrated especially for its copperplate illustrations, maps and plans. It includes a total of 45 engravings depicting views and ground plans of Bohemian towns, castles, and monasteries, as well as a large detailed map of Bohemia. This highly valued map was added to the book as a separate supplement, and is thus rarely found in volumes today.

Das jetzlebende Königreich Böhmen contains an engraving depicting Roudnice, the seat of the Lobkowicz family, in the early 18th century, including the ruined bridge over the Elbe river. The original Gothic bridge constructed in 1333–1340 (one of the first stone bridges built in Bohemia) was first damaged by the Army of the Czech Estates shortly after the Battle of White Mountain in 1620 and then completely demolished by Swedish troops in 1634. Though there was a plan to reconstruct the bridge over the river during the radical rebuilding of the castle and the town under Václav Eusebius, 2nd Prince Lobkowicz in the late 17th century, a new bridge over the river was constructed only in 1910.

Among the engravings included in the book is a view of the capital Prague, divided into two parts. The first copperplate presents the Prague Castle, Lesser Town and Charles Bridge, while the second part depicts a view over the river Vltava toward the Old Town, New Town and the fort Vyšehrad. The copperplates were engraved by a German engraver, Christoph Friedrich Krieger.

An exhibition of Vogt's work was hosted at the Lobkowicz Palace in Prague, until 31 May 2015.
