= Vratislav II of Pernštejn =

Czech nobleman

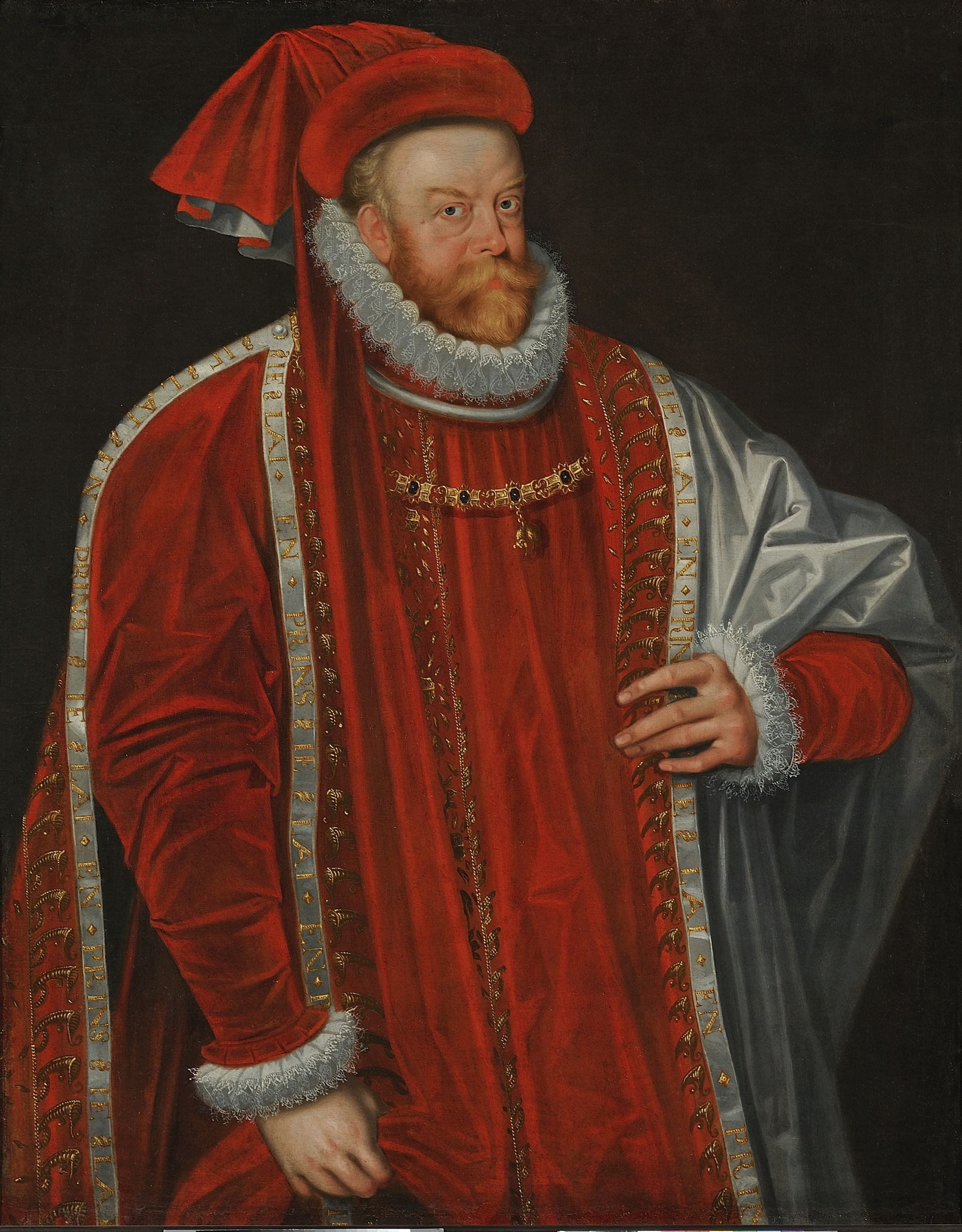
Vratislav II of Pernštejn in the robes of the Order of the Golden Fleece

Vratislav II of Pernštejn (Czech: Vratislav II. z Pernštejna, German: Wratislaw II von Pernstein; 9 July 1530 – 27 October 1582) was a Czech nobleman. From 1567 until his death in 1582, he held the office of High Chancellor of Bohemia. He was also a member of the Privy Council, and a Knight in the Order of the Golden Fleece.

== Biography ==
Vratislav was born on 9 July 1530 in Velké Meziříčí. He came from the Bohemian-Moravian noble Pernštejn family. His parents were Jan IV of Pernštejn, Governor of Moravia and Count of Kladsko, and his second wife Hedwig of Schellenberg (Hedvika z Šelmberka).

Little is known about Vratislav's childhood. At the age of thirteen, his father sent him to the Viennese court of Emperor Ferdinand I, where he was raised together with the later Emperor Maximilian II, who was three years older than him. Together, they took part in the Schmalkaldic War in 1546–1547. Through court service and joint trips, including to Spain and Brussels, Vratislav maintained a close relationship of trust with Maximilian II.

After their father's death in 1548, Vratislav and his brothers inherited his property, which they initially managed together. Although their father had been in debt for some time, the properties they inherited made them one of the richest magnates in Bohemia and Moravia at the time. They were able to pay off the debts their father had left behind, by selling the County of Kladsko in 1549. Despite this, Vratislav and his older brother Jaroslav decided to remain in court service. This is probably why they both soon converted to Catholicism, while their younger brother Vojtěch/Adalbert did not convert.

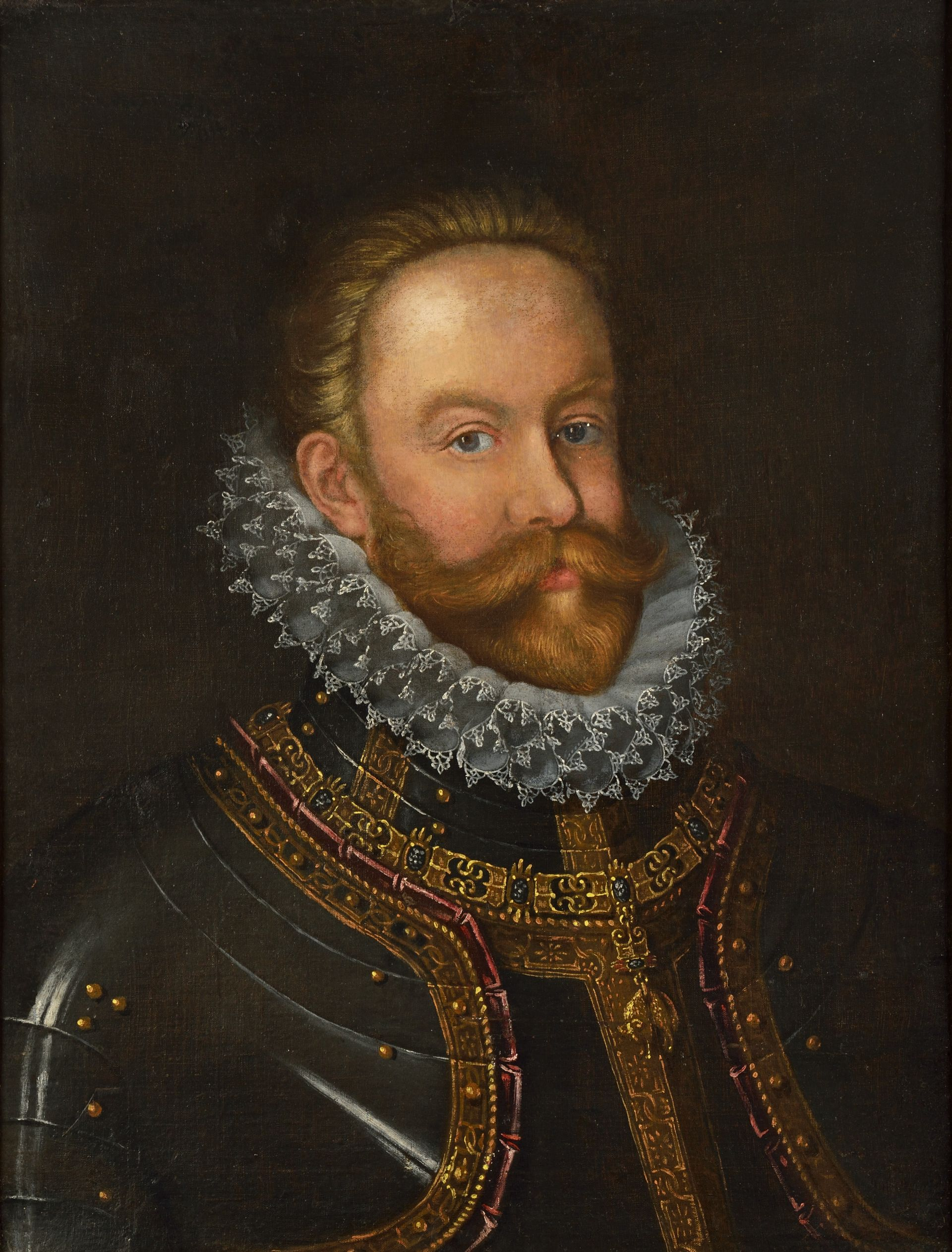
Vratislav II of Pernštejn in armor with a chain of the Golden Fleece

In 1554, Vratislav accompanied the heir to the throne Maximilian II to the wedding of the Spanish King Philip II with Mary of England. On the return journey, he was the first Bohemian nobleman to be admitted to the Order of the Golden Fleece in Antwerp. In 1560, he was sent to Madrid by Emperor Ferdinand I to congratulate the Spanish King Philip II on his marriage with Elisabeth of Valois.
In 1562, Maximilian II appointed him Oberststallmeister, and in 1567 High Chancellor of Bohemia, the highest position in the Kingdom. In 1572, he was sent to Poland together with Wilhelm von Rosenberg, to unsuccessfully support the candidacy to the Polish throne of Archduke Ernest of Austria, Maximilian's son.

Vratislav, who was one of the most distinguished and educated nobles of his time, also had a strong interest in Renaissance humanism art. He had a library and art collection set up at his ancestral castle in Pernštejn. In Nové Město na Moravě, which experienced an economic boom during his reign, he had built the Renaissance town hall in 1555. In Prostějov, he had the castle built by his father, rebuilt in the Renaissance style. In 1567, he had also the Litomyšl Castle built in the Renaissance style. In the castle of Tovačov he set up an extensive library, which he equipped with contemporary literature.

Vratislav drowned in a shipwreck on the Danube near Linz on 27 October 1582. His body was initially buried in the Holy Cross Church in Doubravník, built by his father, in accordance with Vratislav's will. However, when he wrote his will, he assumed that the church would be Catholic again when he died. However, as it still belonged to the Protestants a year after his burial, his widow Maria de Lara decided to rebury his remains in St. Vitus Cathedral in Prague. His tomb remains there to this day.

== Marriage and children ==
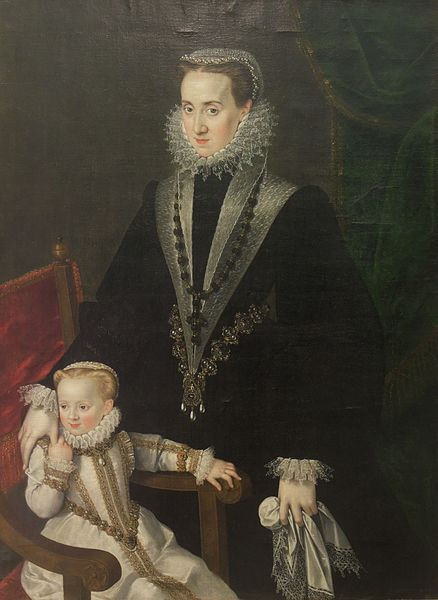
Maria Maximiliana Manrique de Lara with her daughter Polyxena

In 1555, Vratislav married the Spanish Maria Manrique de Lara (1538–1608), a lady-in-waiting of the Empress Maria of Spain. On the occasion of the wedding, she brought a statue from Spain, which is still venerated today as the Infant Jesus of Prague.

The marriage produced twenty children, of whom only seven survived to adulthood:

- Johanna (1556–1631), married 1584 Fernando de Aragón y Borja (1546–1592), 5th Duke of Villahermosa
- Elisabeth (1557–1609), married 1578 Albrecht von Fürstenberg (1557–1599)
- Johann (1561–1597), married 1587 Anna Maria Manrique de Lara y Mendoza, killed in battle
- Franziska (1565–1630/35), married Andrea Matteo Acquaviva d’Aragona Principe di Caserta († 1647)
- Polyxena (1566–1642), married 1. 1587 Wilhelm von Rosenberg; 2. 1603 Zdeněk Vojtěch Popel of Lobkowicz
- Maximilian (1575–1593), canon in Olomouc
- Bibiana (1578/84–1616), married 1598 Francesco Gonzaga di Castiglione (1577–1616), Knight in the Order of the Golden Fleece and brother of Saint Aloysius Gonzaga.

== Sources ==
- Petr Vorel: Páni z Pernštejna. Vzestup a pád rodu zubří hlavy v dějinách Čech a Moravy. ISBN 80-86182-24-X. (in Czech)
- Joachim Bahlcke u. a.: Handbuch der historischen Stätten Böhmen und Mähren, Kröner-Verlag, Stuttgart 1998, ISBN 3-520-32901-8, pp. 302, 331, 407, 441 and 500. (in German)
- Massimo Marocchi, Principi, santi, assassini, Mantua, 2015, ISBN 978-88-95490-74-8. (in Italian)
- Medaillen auf berühmte und ausgezeichnete Männer des österreichischen Kaiserstaates, vom XVI. bis zum XIX. Jahrhunderte. P120-126 Wienbibliothek im Rathaus (in German)
