= Nelahozeves =

Municipality in the Czech Republic

- Municipality
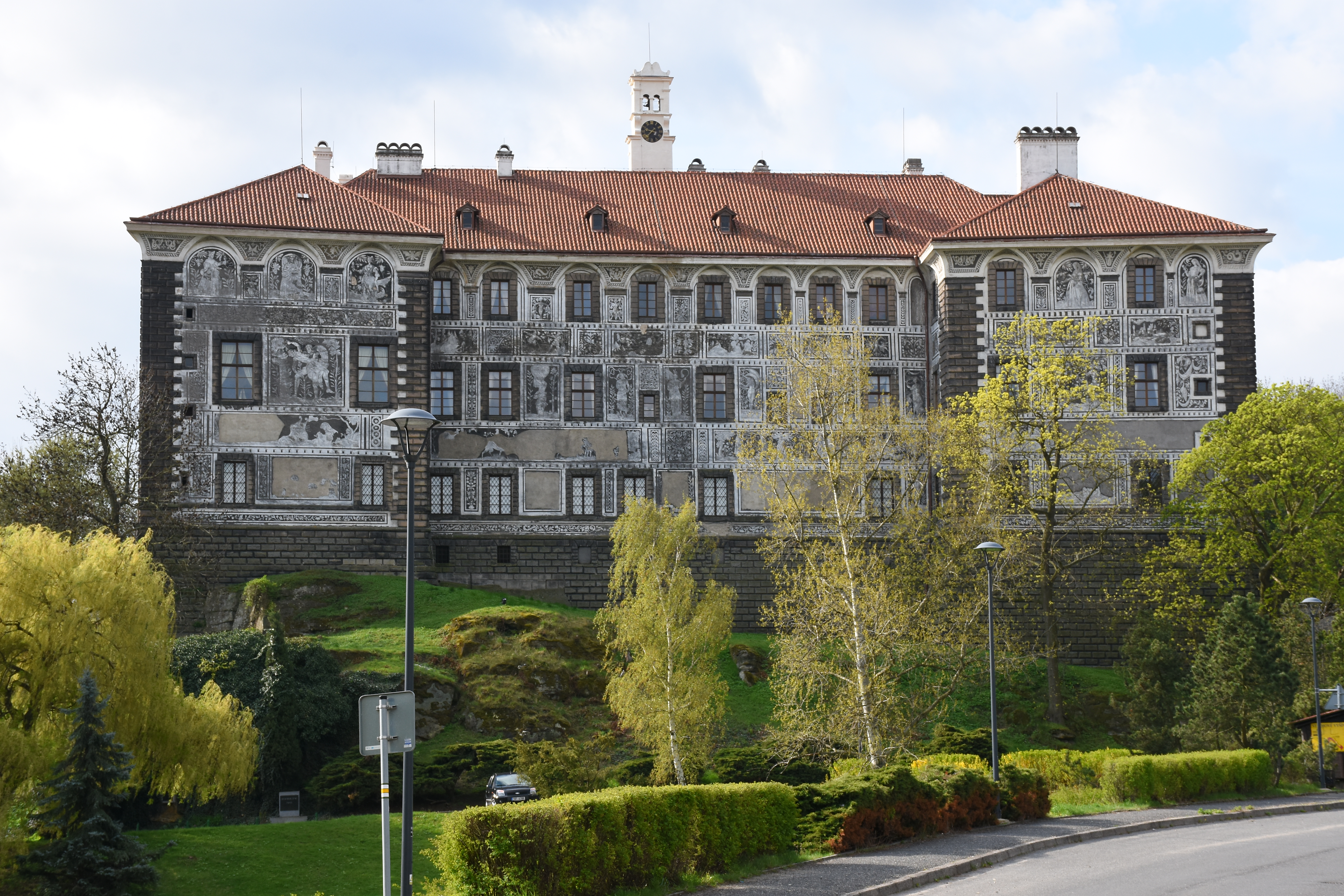
- Nelahozeves Castle

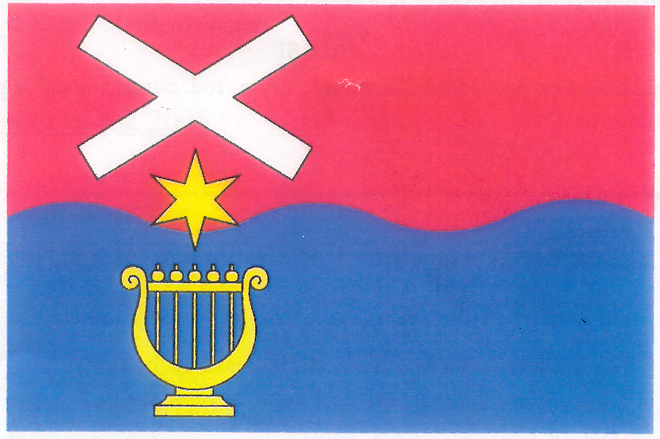
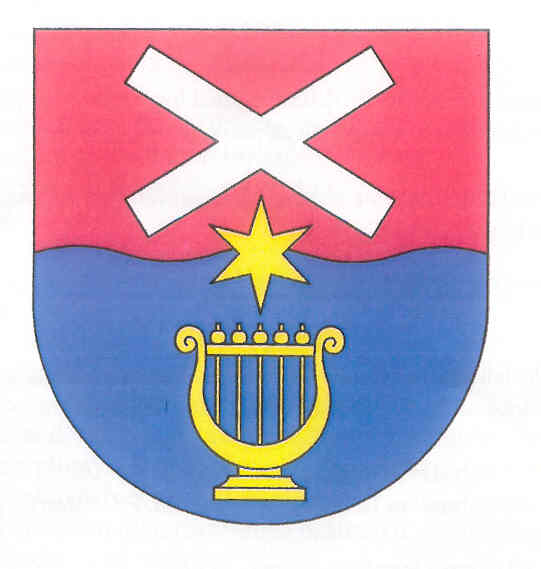
- Flag Coat of arms

- Location in the Czech Republic
- Coordinates: 50°15′42″N 14°17′56″E
- Country: Czech Republic
- Region: Central Bohemian
- District: Mělník
- First mentioned: 1352

Area
  - Total: 9.95 km^{2} (3.84 sq mi)
- Elevation: 177 m (581 ft)

Population (2026-01-01)
  - Total: 2,213
  - Density: 222/km^{2} (576/sq mi)
- Time zone: UTC+1 (CET)
  - Summer (DST): UTC+2 (CEST)
- Postal code: 277 51
- Website: nelahozeves.cz

Nelahozeves (Czech pronunciation: [ˈnɛlaɦozɛvɛs]) is a municipality and village in Mělník District in the Central Bohemian Region of the Czech Republic. It has about 2,200 inhabitants. The municipality is located in the Lower Ohře Table, on left bank of the Vltava River. Nelahozeves is known for the Nelahozeves Castle and as the birthplace of Antonín Dvořák, who is considered to be one of the greatest Czech composers.

== Administrative division ==
Nelahozeves consists of five municipal parts (in brackets population according to the 2021 census):

- Nelahozeves (1,018)
- Hleďsebe 1.díl (204)
- Hleďsebe 2.díl (44)
- Lešany (845)
- Podhořany (50)

== Etymology ==
The name Nelahozeves was derived from the personal name Nelahoda. It was the probable founder of the village.

== Geography ==
Nelahozeves is located about 18 kilometres (11 mi) north of Prague. It lies in the Lower Ohře Table. The municipality is situated on the left bank of the Vltava River. The highest point is at 274 m (899 ft) above sea level.

== History ==
The first written mention of Nelahozeves is from 1352, when the Church of Saint Andrew already existed. The village was owned by the royal chamber and then by the Metropolitan Chapter at Saint Vitus. After the Hussite Wars, it was again property of Czech kings.

In 1544, Nelahozeves was acquired by Florian Griesbeck of Griesbach. He had built a castle here, the construction of which began in 1553. His son, Blažej, continued to expand the estate and completed the construction of the castle in its final form in 1613. After his death in 1620, however, he left the estate in debt, so it was bought by Polyxena of Lobkowicz in 1623. The estate suffered damage during the Thirty Years' War, but recovered in the second half of the 17th century. After the war, the castle was reconstructed by Václav Eusebius Lobkowicz, who used the castle as the centre for administration and management of his estates. However, the castle never served as the Lobkowicz family's residence. The Lobkowicz family owned Nelahozeves until the establishment of an independent municipality in 1850.

In 1850, the railway was opened.

== Demographics ==
Historical population

Year	Pop.	±%
1869	1,016	—
1880	1,077	+6.0%
1890	1,091	+1.3%
1900	1,242	+13.8%
1910	1,282	+3.2%

Year	Pop.	±%
1921	1,305	+1.8%
1930	1,659	+27.1%
1950	1,707	+2.9%
1961	1,864	+9.2%
1970	1,732	−7.1%

Year	Pop.	±%
1980	1,514	−12.6%
1991	1,216	−19.7%
2001	1,259	+3.5%
2011	1,804	+43.3%
2021	2,161	+19.8%

Source: Censuses

== Transport ==
Nelahozeves is located on the railway line Prague–Ústí nad Labem.

== Sights ==
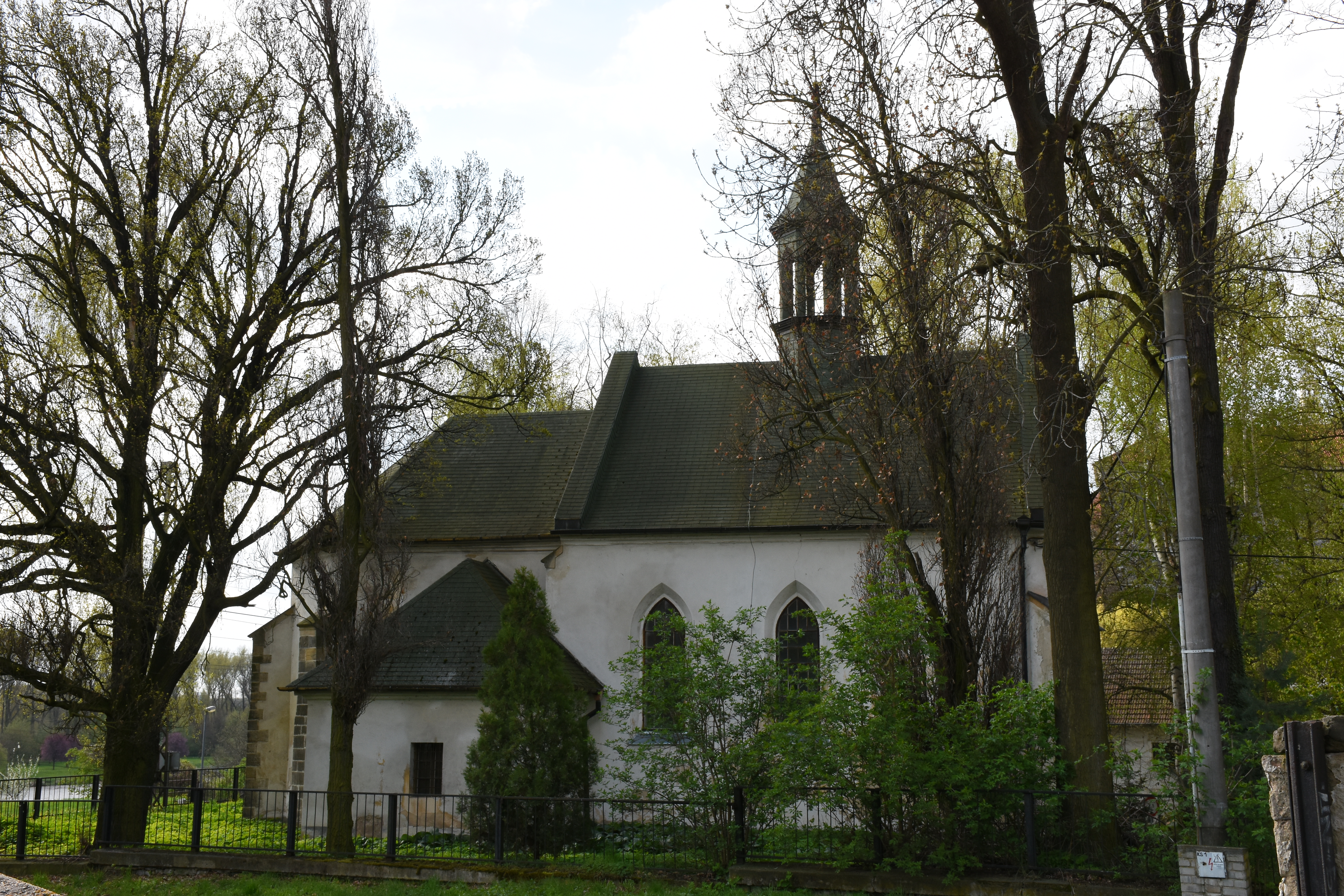
Church of Saint Andrew

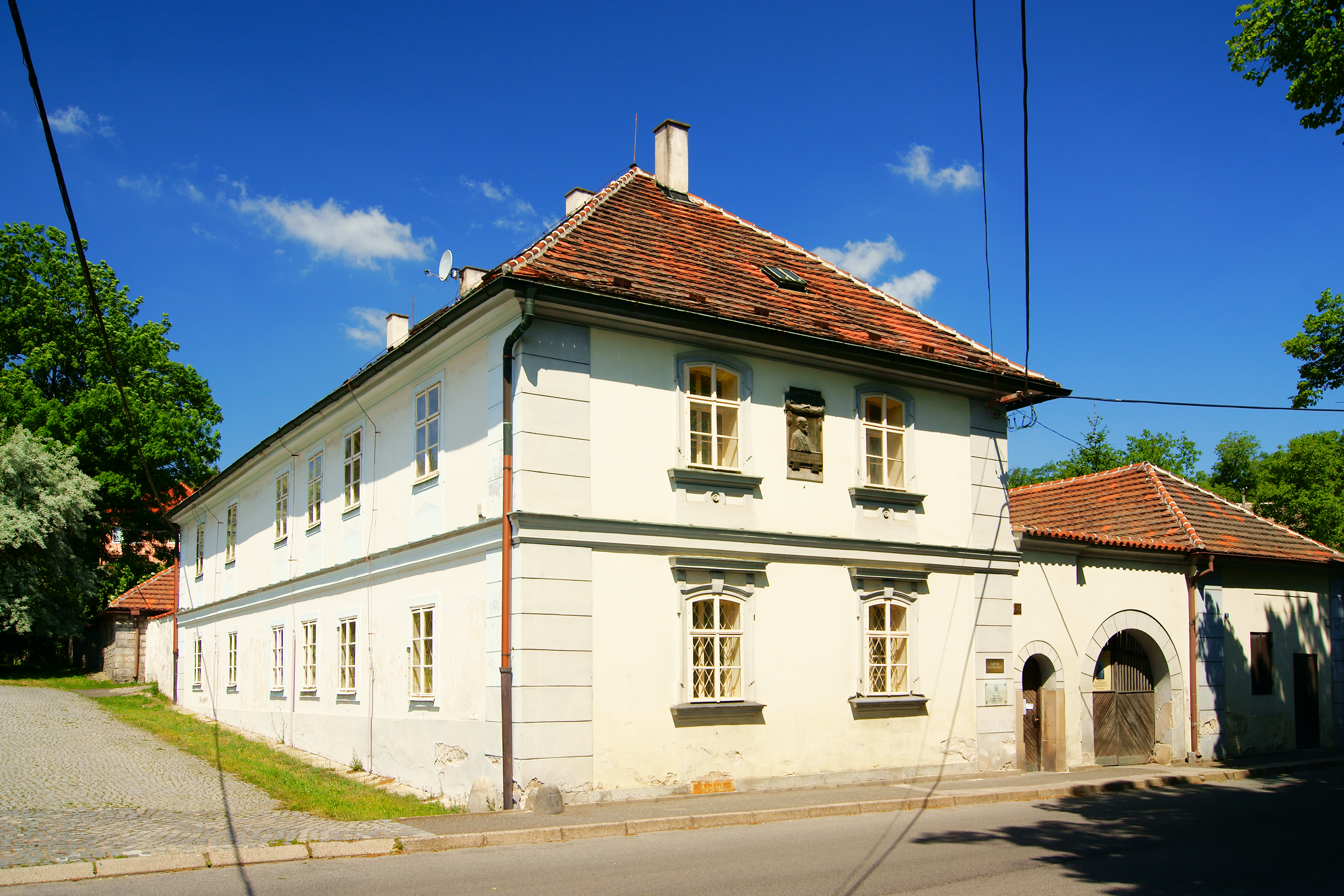
Birth house of Antonín Dvořák

The main landmark of Nelahozeves is the Nelahozeves Castle. It is a Renaissance castle, built by the builder Bonifaz Wolmut in 1553–1613. The castle is an example of the castello fortezza, a design with faux architectural defenses, including decorative bastions and an entry bridge without a moat. The building is decorated by sgraffiti that depict scenes from Greek mythology and the Old Testament. The most noteworthy of the castle's interior rooms is the Knight's Hall, which dates from 1564. The castle was confiscated from the Lobkowicz family in 1948 and returned to them in 1993. Today it features an exhibition of historical period rooms, demonstrating the lifestyle of a Bohemian noble family in the mid-19th century. The castle also houses part of the Lobkowicz collection of paintings.

The Church of Saint Andrew is a Gothic building, modified in the neo-Gothic style in the 19th century.

The birth house of Antonín Dvořák is a Baroque house with a small museum focusing on his life. Until 2019, it was operated by the National Museum in Prague; since 2019 it has been operated by the Lobkowicz family.

== Notable people ==
- Antonín Dvořák (1841–1904), composer
