= Bellotto =

- Pronunciation: Portuguese pronunciation: [beˈlotu]

Origin
- Language: Italian
- Region of origin: Italy, Brazil

Bellotto is a surname, which may refer to:

- Antonio "Tony" (Carlos Liberalli) Bellotto (born 1960), a Brazilian musician (guitarist) and writer
- Bernardo Bellotto (1720 - 1780), a Venetian landscape painter or vedutista, and printmaker
- Ettore Bellotto (1895 - 1966), an Italian gymnast
- Niko Bellotto, an Argentine solo electronic musician
- Pietro Bellotto can refer to one of two painters
  - Pietro Bellotti (1625–1700) Baroque portrait painter from Venice and Bolzano.
  - younger brother of Bernardo Bellotto, a second Pietro Bellotto (1725-c. 1805) was a Venetian vedute painter, active for years in France
