= Bříza =

- Municipality
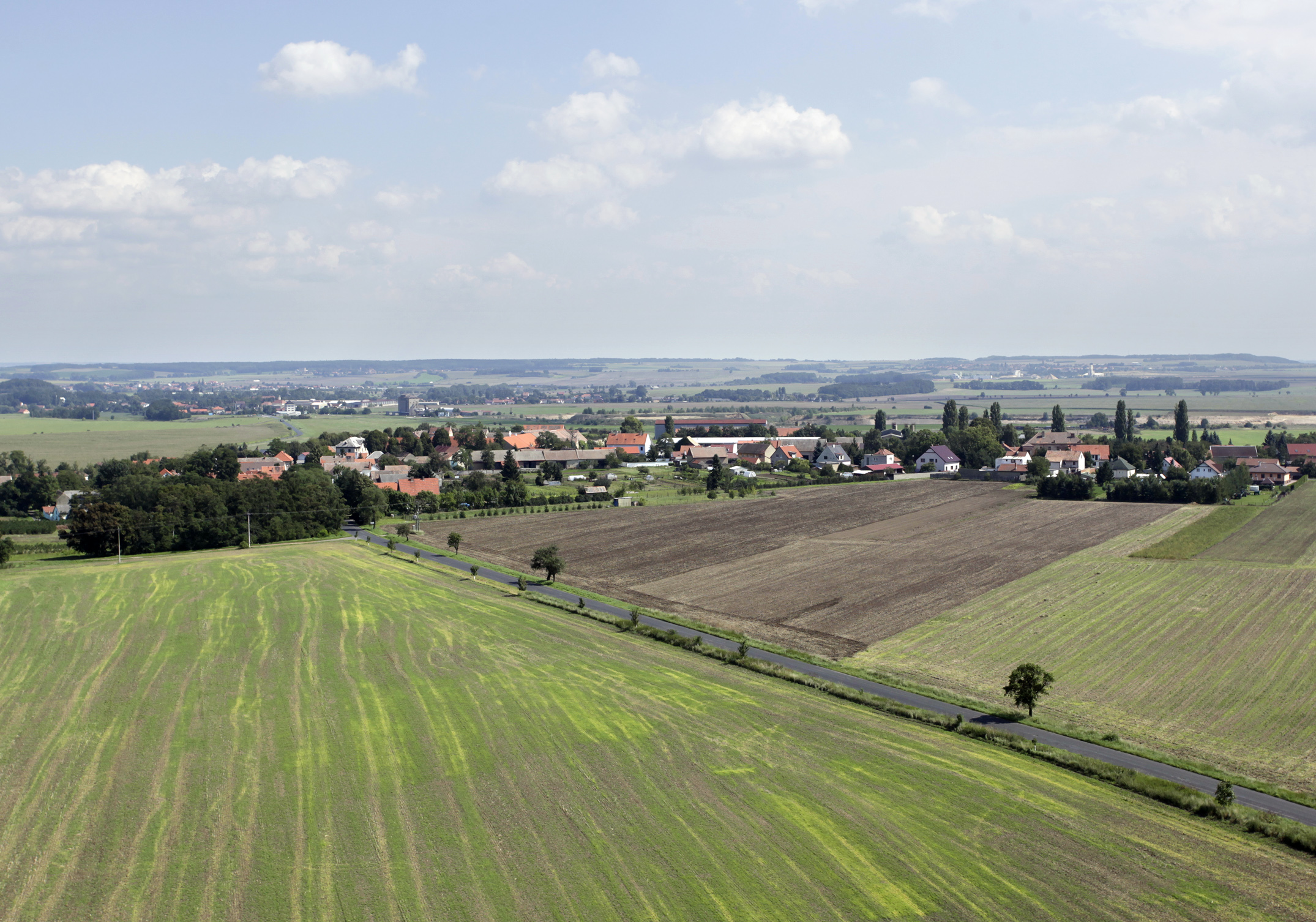
- View from the west

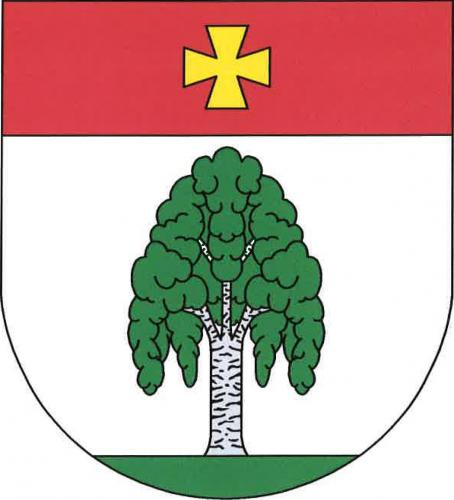
- Flag Coat of arms

- Location in the Czech Republic
- Coordinates: 50°21′38″N 14°12′59″E
- Country: Czech Republic
- Region: Ústí nad Labem
- District: Litoměřice
- First mentioned: 1347

Area
  - Total: 7.79 km^{2} (3.01 sq mi)
- Elevation: 240 m (790 ft)

Population (2026-01-01)
  - Total: 437
  - Density: 56.1/km^{2} (145/sq mi)
- Time zone: UTC+1 (CET)
  - Summer (DST): UTC+2 (CEST)
- Postal code: 413 01
- Website: www.obecbriza.info

Bříza is a municipality and village in Litoměřice District in the Ústí nad Labem Region of the Czech Republic. It has about 400 inhabitants.

Bříza lies approximately 22 kilometres (14 mi) south of Litoměřice, 36 km (22 mi) south of Ústí nad Labem, and 34 km (21 mi) north-west of Prague.

== Demographics ==
Historical population
Year	Pop.	±%
1869	580	—
1880	657	+13.3%
1890	700	+6.5%
1900	656	−6.3%
1910	708	+7.9%
1921	725	+2.4%
1930	729	+0.6%
1950	538	−26.2%
1961	543	+0.9%
1970	456	−16.0%
1980	383	−16.0%
1991	320	−16.4%
2001	355	+10.9%
2011	399	+12.4%
2021	438	+9.8%
Source: Censuses
