= Prusinovice =

- Municipality
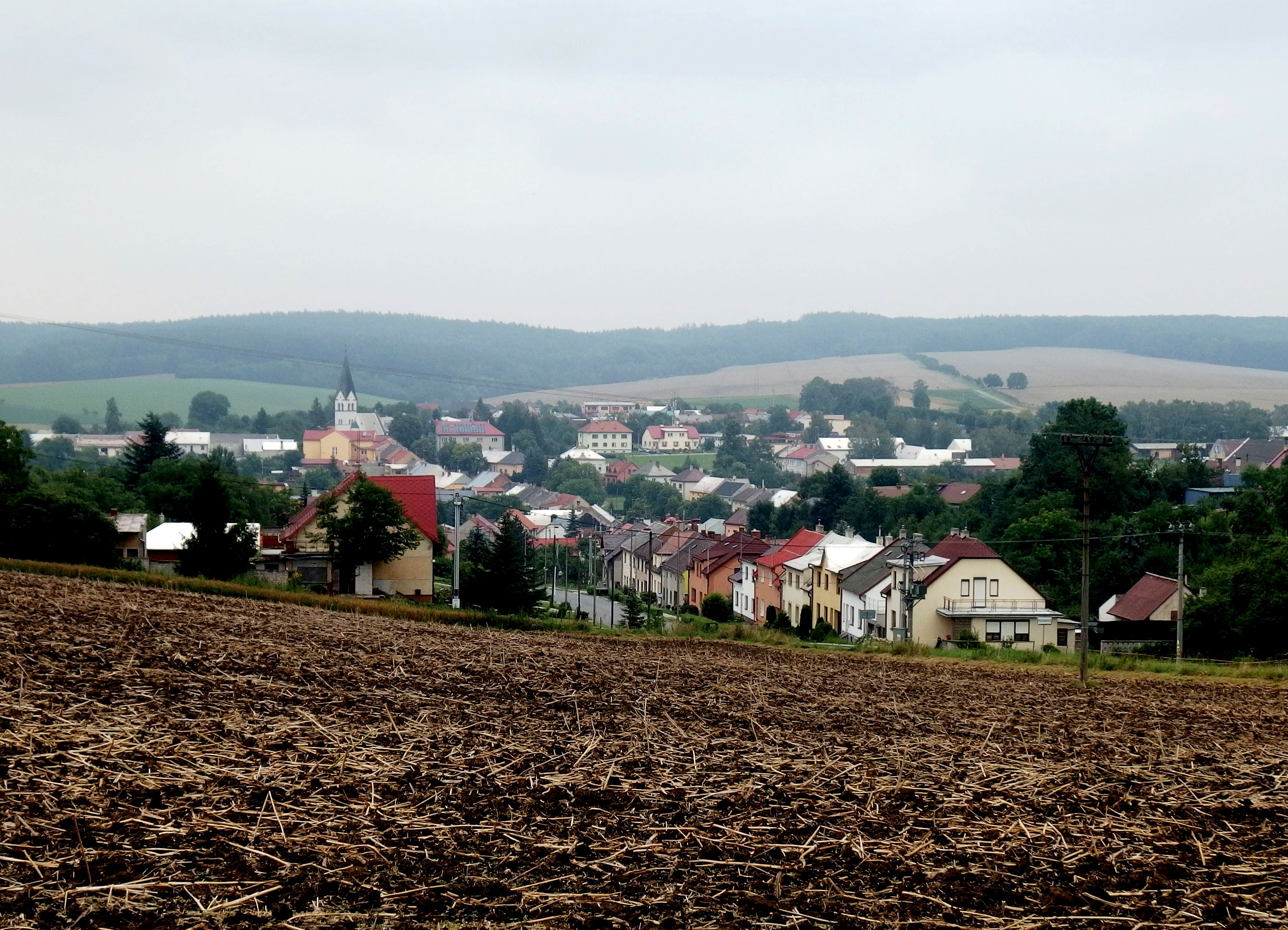
- General view of Prusinovice

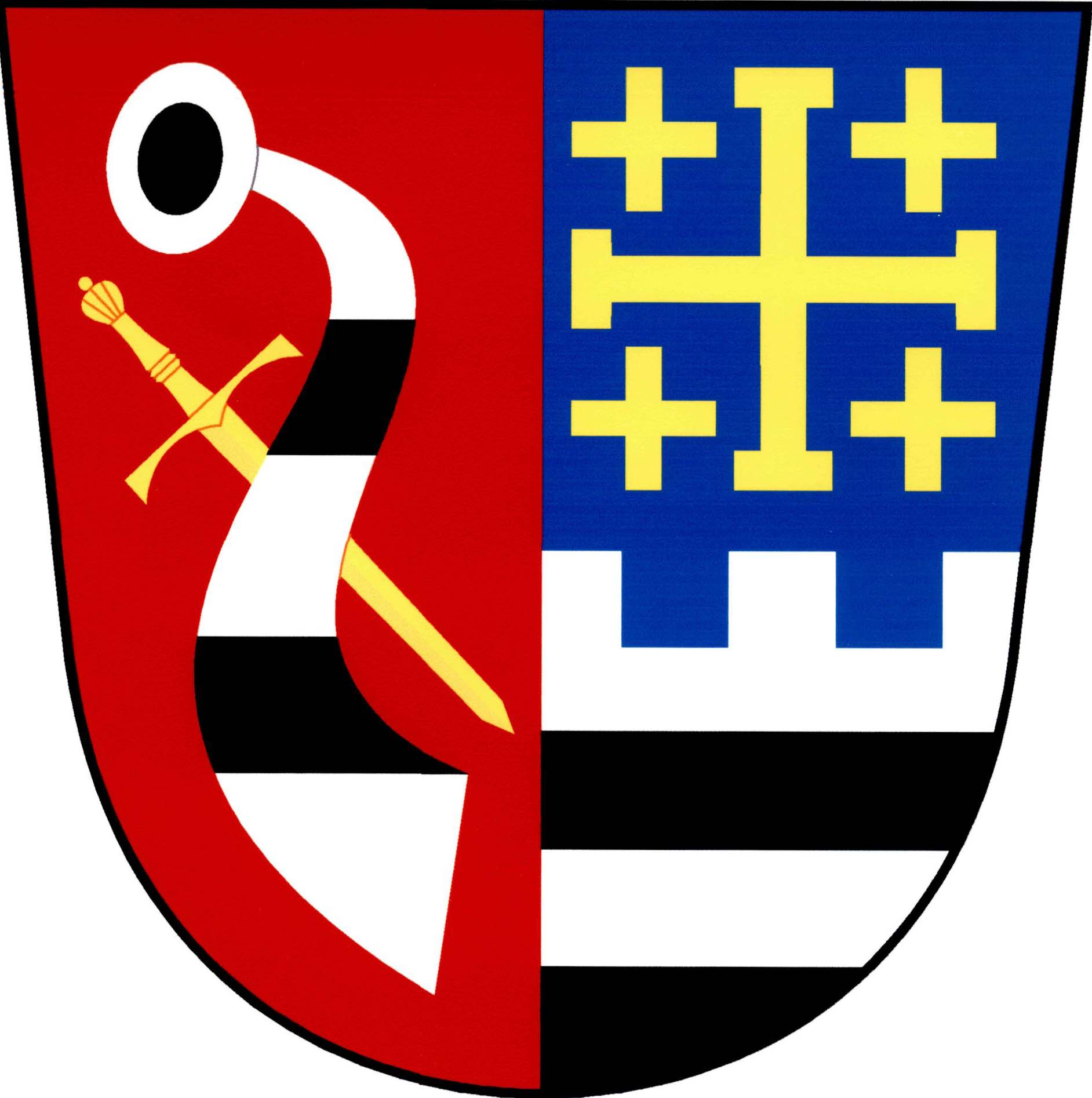
- Flag Coat of arms

- Location in the Czech Republic
- Coordinates: 49°22′44″N 17°35′14″E
- Country: Czech Republic
- Region: Zlín
- District: Kroměříž
- First mentioned: 1349

Area
  - Total: 10.69 km^{2} (4.13 sq mi)
- Elevation: 263 m (863 ft)

Population (2026-01-01)
  - Total: 1,193
  - Density: 111.6/km^{2} (289.0/sq mi)
- Time zone: UTC+1 (CET)
  - Summer (DST): UTC+2 (CEST)
- Postal code: 768 42
- Website: www.prusinovice.cz

Prusinovice is a municipality and village in Kroměříž District in the Zlín Region of the Czech Republic. It has about 1,200 inhabitants.

Prusinovice lies approximately 18 kilometres (11 mi) north-east of Kroměříž, 18 km (11 mi) north of Zlín, and 242 km (150 mi) east of Prague.

== Demographics ==
Historical population
Year	Pop.	±%
1869	1,119	—
1880	1,299	+16.1%
1890	1,371	+5.5%
1900	1,437	+4.8%
1910	1,514	+5.4%
1921	1,391	−8.1%
1930	1,385	−0.4%
1950	1,256	−9.3%
1961	1,408	+12.1%
1970	1,344	−4.5%
1980	1,262	−6.1%
1991	1,199	−5.0%
2001	1,180	−1.6%
2011	1,225	+3.8%
2021	1,147	−6.4%
Source: Censuses
