= Zdeněk Vojtěch Popel of Lobkowicz =

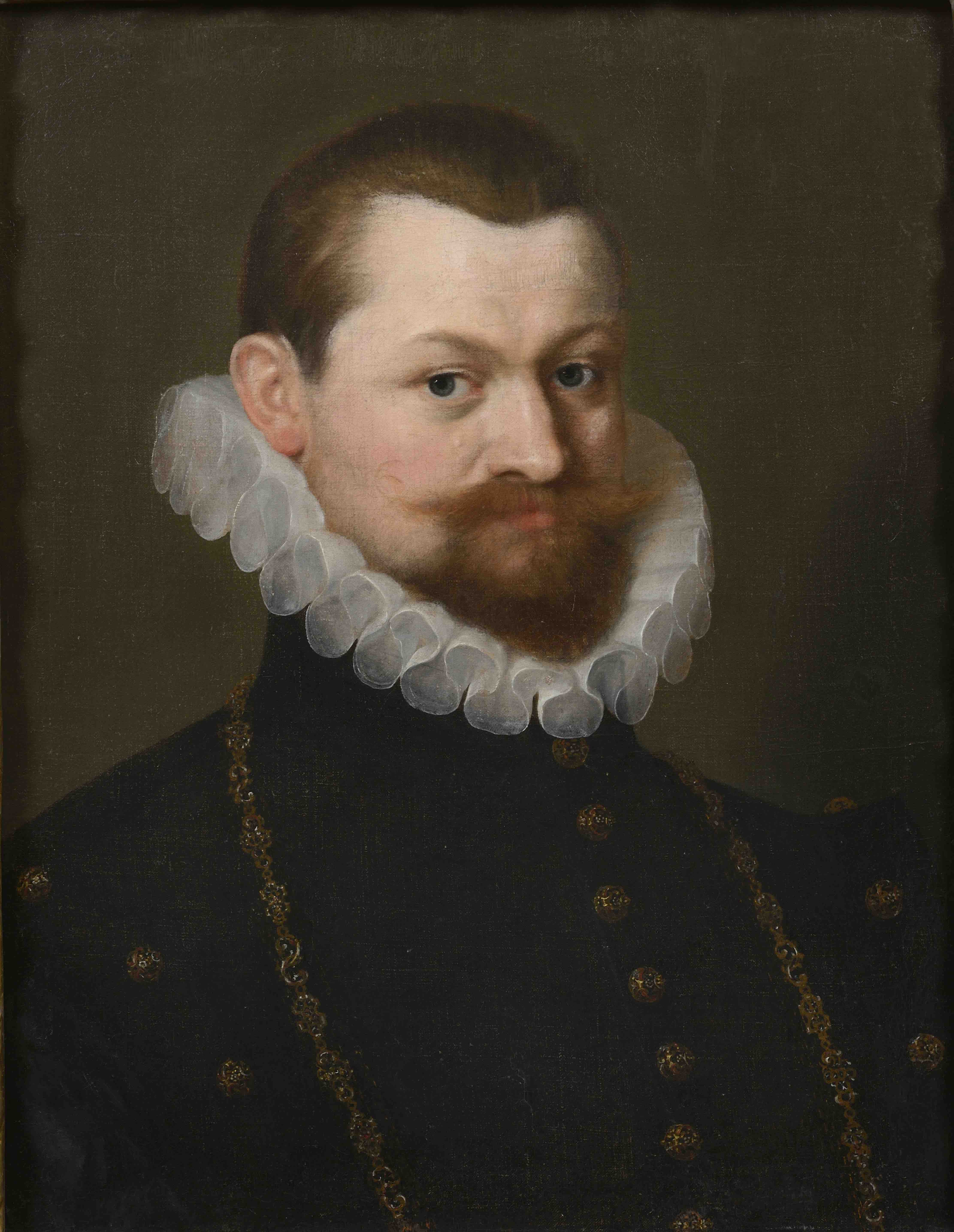
Portrait of Zdeněk Vojtěch Popel of Lobkowicz

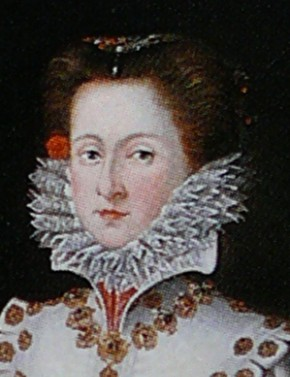
His wife Polyxena of Pernštejn

Prince Zdeněk Vojtěch Popel of Lobkowicz (also Zdenko Adalbert Popel of Lobkowicz; Czech: Zdeněk Vojtěch Popel z Lobkovic, German: Zdeněk Vojtěch Popel von Lobkowitz; 15 August 1568 – 16 June 1628) was a Czech noble and High Chancellor of Bohemia.

== Biography ==
Zdeněk came from the Popel of Lobkowicz branch of the Lobkowicz family. His parents were Ladislav Popel of Lobkowicz and Johanna Berka of Dubá. After an education with the Jesuits and at Charles University in Prague, he undertook educational journeys through Europe.

Upon his return, he entered the diplomatic service at the Imperial court in Prague in 1591. When Emperor Rudolf II, at the urging of the Pope, began filling the Bohemian provincial offices in 1599 with Catholics who had distinguished themselves in the re-Catholicization process, or who had received a strict Catholic education, Zdeněk was appointed Supreme Chancellor of the Kingdom of Bohemia. The articulate and well-educated Zdeněk thus became the secular leader of the Catholics of the Bohemian nobility and a staunch opponent of the Reformation. After his marriage in 1603, he lived in the Lobkowicz Palace in Prague.

When Emperor Rudolf granted religious freedom to the Protestant estates in a Letter of Majesty in 1609, Zdeněk sided with the Catholic opposition of the Bohemian lords and refused to sign it. Under Emperor Matthias, he was able to maintain his leading position in Bohemia. Since 1598, Zdeněk had been in close contact with Bishop Melchior Khlesl, who led Matthias's government since the spring of 1609. Later, Zdeněk had problems with Khlesl's policy of compromise as the Emperor's favorite minister. In 1617, he was among the supporters of the coronation of Ferdinand II as King of Bohemia and managed to divide the opposition.

He escaped the Defenestration of Prague in 1618, because he was in Vienna at the time for negotiations at the imperial court. Even after the Battle of White Mountain, he remained primarily at the imperial court in Vienna. As chancellor, he advocated to commute death sentences into long prison terms, in the punishment of those involved in the Bohemian Revolt and opposed the confiscation of property. His political influence diminished as a result.

In 1621, after the death of his brother Ladislav, he inherited the Holešov estate. After the Battle of White Mountain, he was able to acquire the estates of Bystřice pod Hostýnem, Prusinovice, and Dřevohostice, which had previously belonged to Václav Bítovský of Bítov, confiscated from the Protestants.

In 1620, he became a Knight in the Order of the Golden Fleece.

In 1623, Ferdinand II elevated him to the rank of first Prince of Lobkowicz.

=== Marriage and children ===
In 1603, Zdeněk married Polyxena of Pernštejn, widow of William of Rosenberg, who was considered one of the richest widows in Bohemia. From the inheritance of her Spanish mother, Maria Manrique de Lara, she also possessed the later famous statue of the Infant Jesus of Prague, which she donated to the Carmelites in Prague for public veneration.

The marriage produced one son:

- Václav Eusebius of Lobkowicz (1609–1677), his heir and successor

== Sources ==
- Deutsche Nationalbibliothek
- BLKÖ:Popel-Lobkowitz, Zdenko Adalbert
