= Václav Eusebius František, Prince of Lobkowicz =

Bohemian nobleman, general, and politician (1609–1677)

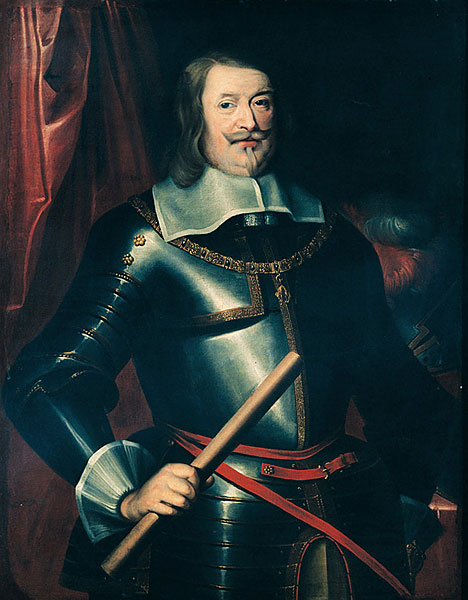
Painting of Václav Eusebius by Anselm van Hulle

Václav Eusebius František, Prince of Lobkowicz (German: Fürst Wenzel Eusebius von Lobkowicz; 30 January 1609 – 22 April 1677) was a Bohemian nobleman, military leader and diplomat. He was member of the Lobkowicz family and after 1646, he was Duke of Sagan.

== Life ==
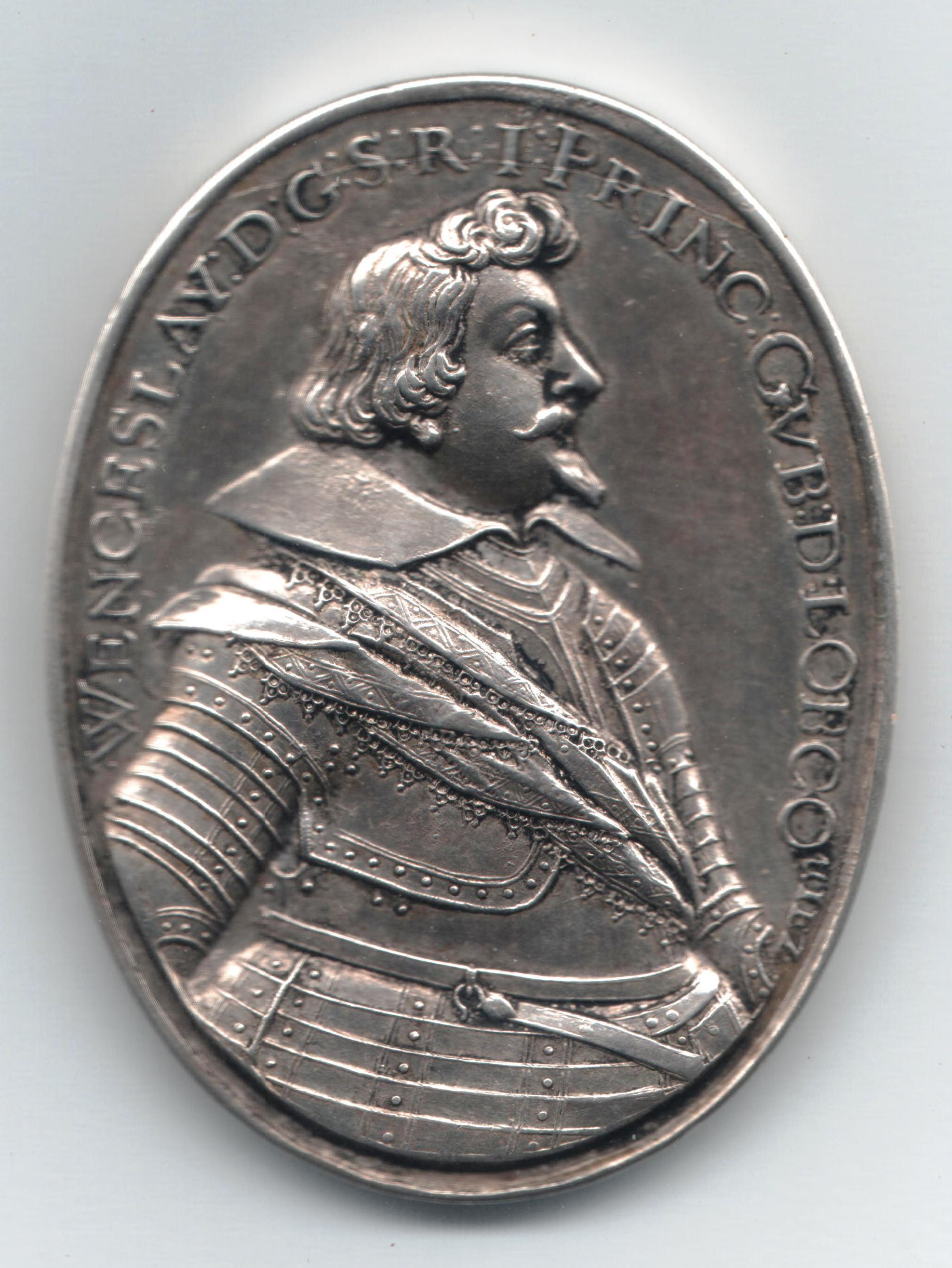
Medal with portrait of Václav Eusebius

Born in Roudnice in the noble House of Lobkowicz, he was the son of Bohemian Chancellor Zdeněk Vojtěch Popel of Lobkowicz and Polyxena of Pernštejn. He was a passionate advocate of Catholic doctrine and succeeded, with clever tactics, in amassing a considerable fortune for the Roudnice branch of the family.

After a thorough training, he joined the Imperial Army in 1631, where he raised his own regiment to fight in the Thirty Years' War and reached the rank of field marshal. He later made a name as a politician and diplomat, holding the titles of President of the Imperial War Council (from 1652) and President of the Imperial Privy Council (from 1669).
In 1646 he purchased the Silesian Duchy of Sagan which Emperor Ferdinand III had confiscated in 1634 after the death of the imperial commander Albrecht von Wallenstein. He extensively renovated his family's properties, overseeing the remodeling of the Lobkowicz Palace by Italian Baroque architects and the transformation of Roudnice Castle from a ruin to the family seat.

As a confidant of Emperor Leopold I, he was appointed President of the Hofrat in 1657, and Obersthofmeister in 1665. Although his parents - especially his mother, the daughter of a Spanish noblewoman - were pro-Spanish, he sought allies at the French court, thus creating many enemies amongst the Spanish supporters at the Habsburg court in Vienna. Because of their intervention, he fell out of favor with the Emperor in 1674. He was arrested and imprisoned in Roudnice, where he died 3 years later.

== Marriage and children ==
Václav Eusebius married Countess Johana Myšková of Žlunice (Gräfin Johanna von Zlunitz) (1600–1650) on 3 November 1638. They had no children.

His second marriage was on 6 February 1653 with Countess palatine Auguste Sophie von Pfalz-Sulzbach (1624–1682), daughter of Duke Augustus, Count Palatine of Sulzbach. They had 5 children:

- Stillborn son (1654)
- Ferdinand August (1655–1715), 3rd Prince of Lobkowicz, Duke of Sagan
- Philipp Ferdinand Adalbert (1656–1659)
- Marie Hedwig Sophie (1658–1660)
- Franz Wilhelm (1659–1698)
