= Polyxena of Lobkowicz =

Czech noble (1566–1642)

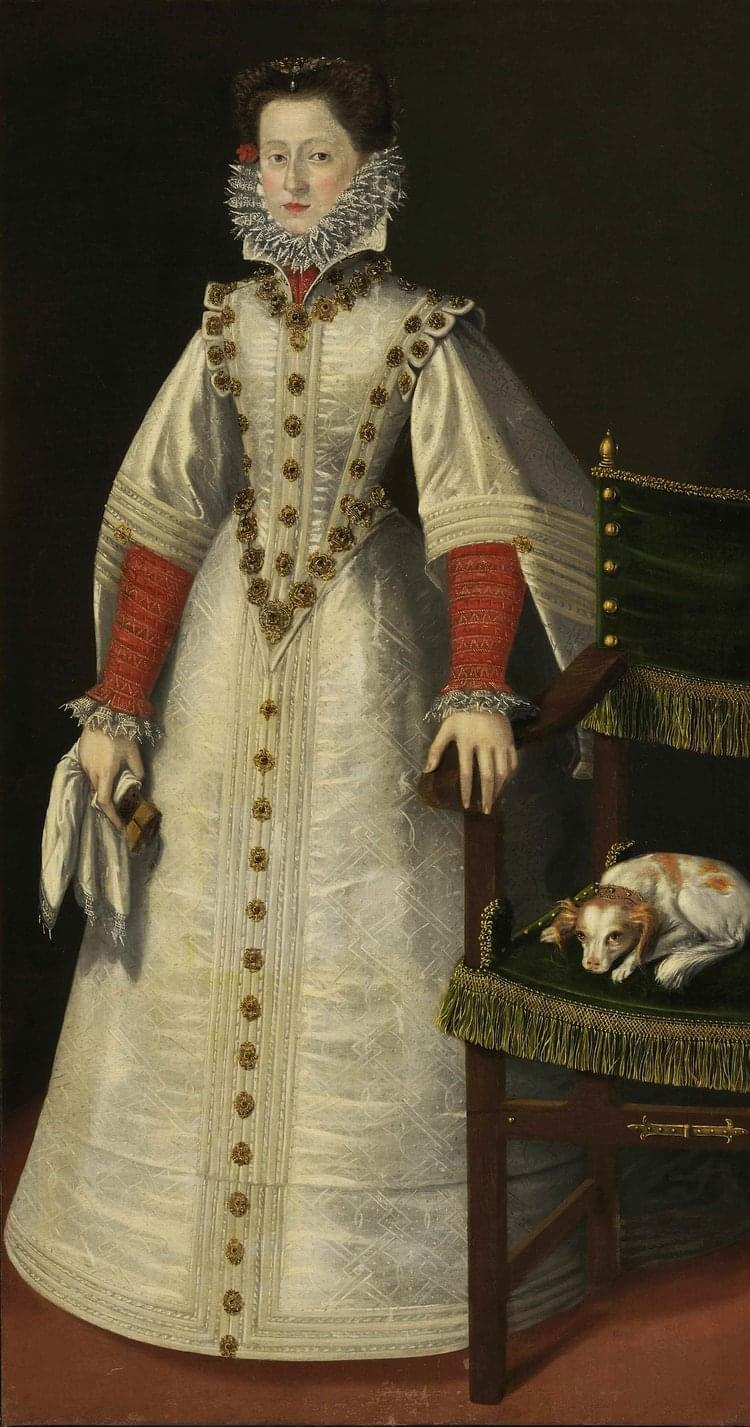
Princess Polyxena of Lobkowicz

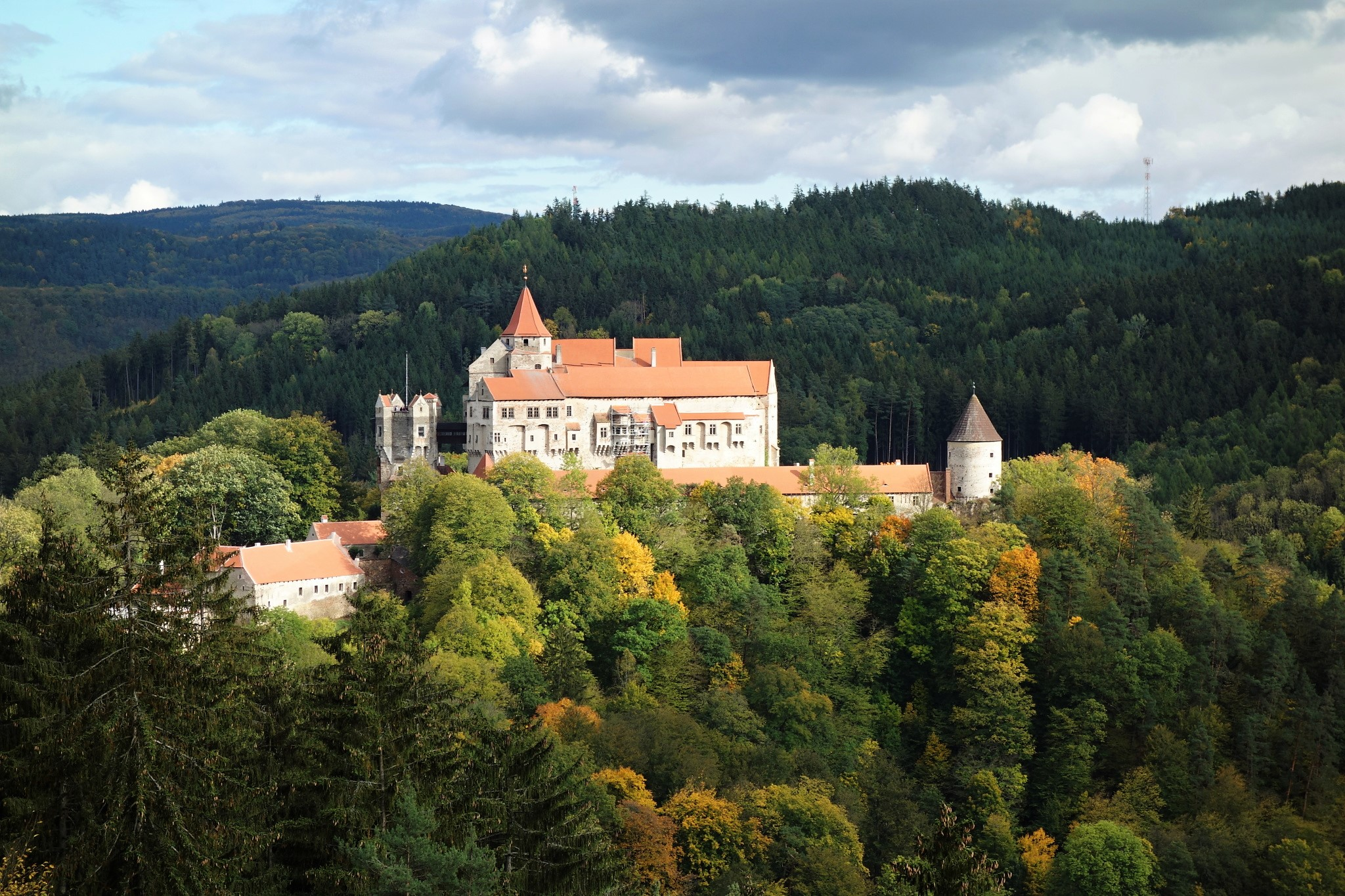
Pernštejn Castle

Polyxena of Lobkowicz (1566 – 24 May 1642) was a politically active Czech noble and styled Princess of the House of Lobkowicz. She played an important role as the channel between the noble families of Bohemia and the imperial court in Vienna through her connection with the Spanish envoy during the counter-reformation in Bohemia after 1618.

== Life ==
Born into an ancient House of Pernštejn, she was the daughter of the Imperial High Chancellor of Bohemia, Vratislav II of Pernštejn (1530–1582), and his wife, Maria Maximiliana Manrique de Lara y Mendoza (1538-1608), a Spanish noblewoman. Maria brought with her from Spain a statue of the Child Jesus, which she had received as a wedding present. It became well known for its purported miraculous healing powers.

Maria Pernštejn presented the statue to her daughter, upon Polyxena's marriage to the High Burgrave Wilhelm von Rosenberg in 1587. William died in 1592. In 1603, the widowed Polyxena remarried the Imperial High Chancellor Zdeněk Vojtěch Popel of Lobkowicz (1568-1628). This marriage produced only one son, Wenzel Eusebius von Lobkowicz, whom she gave birth to in 1609 at the age of 42.

In 1618, the aging Emperor Matthias named his cousin Ferdinand of Styria his heir, and had him crowned King of Bohemia. Tensions increased between the Catholic Ferdinand and the Protestant nobles. The application of the Letter of Majesty was controversial in Bohemia. The Protestants argued that it allowed them to build churches on Crown and Catholic prelates' lands, but the Catholics did not accept their interpretation. In 1618 two of the Emperor's royal governors were thrown from the windows of Hradčany Castle by Protestant nobles. They survived the fall and took refuge from a mob in the Lobkowicz Palace below the castle, protected by Polyxena Lobkowicz. The Defenestration in Prague contributed to the subsequent Bohemian Revolt.

In 1628, Polyxena Pernštejn von Lobkowicz donated the statue to the Discalced Carmelites of the Carmelite Church of Our Lady Victorious. It became known as the Infant of Prague.

She is the ancestor of several royal families, including that of the Russian Emperors, the Kings of Denmark, Greece, Norway and Great Britain, and others.

== Bibliography ==
- Petr Vorel: Páni z Pernštejna. Vzestup a pád rodu zubří hlavy v dějinách Čech a Moravy. Rybka, Prag 1999, ISBN 80-86182-24-X, S. 265, 267f., 271–274 und 276–280.
