= Ferdinand Joseph von Lobkowicz =

Austrian nobleman (1797–1868)

- Prince of Lobkowicz; Duke of Raudnitz
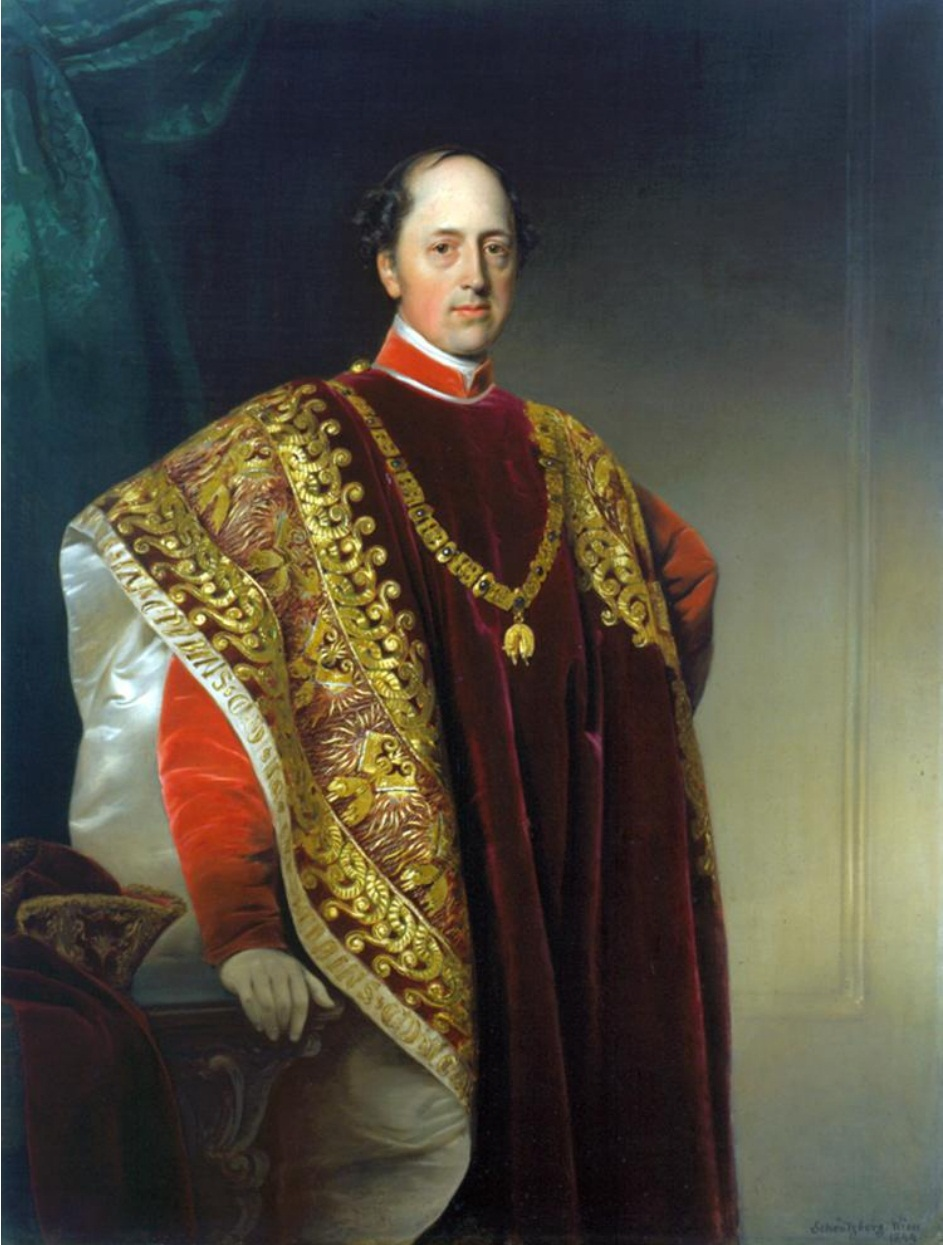
- Portrait of Prince Lobkowicz by Franz Schrotzberg, 1844
- Born: 13 April 1797; Hollabrunn, Lower Austria
- Died: 18 December 1868 (aged 71); Vienna, Austria
- Spouse: Princess Maria of Liechtenstein (m. 1826; died 1868)
- Issue: Prince Maximilian von Lobkowicz; Prince Moritz von Lobkowicz; Princess Léopoldine Bossi-Fedrigotti; Princess Marie Blücher von Wahlstatt
- House: Lobkowicz
- Father: Joseph Franz von Lobkowicz
- Mother: Maria Karolina von Schwarzenberg

His Serene Highness Ferdinand Joseph Johann Nepomuk von Lobkowicz (13 April 1797 – 18 December 1868), 8th Prince of Lobkowicz, 2nd Duke of Raudnitz, was an aristocrat of Bohemia, from the Lobkowicz family.

== Early life ==
Ferdinand was born on 13 April 1797 in Hollabrunn, Lower Austria. He was the eldest son of the twelve children of Joseph Franz, 7th Prince of Lobkowicz (1772–1816) (who had further been further ennobled in 1786 by Emperor Joseph II as Duke of Roudnice) and Princess Maria Karolina von Schwarzenberg (1775–1816).

His paternal grandparents were Ferdinand Philipp, 6th Prince Lobkowicz (son of Phillip Hyacinth, 4th Prince of Lobkowicz) and Princess Maria Gabriella di Savoia-Carignano (a daughter of Louis Victor, Prince of Carignano and Princess Christine of Hesse-Rotenburg). His maternal grandparents were Johann I, Prince of Schwarzenberg and Countess Maria Eleonore zu Oettingen-Wallerstein (a daughter of Count Philipp Karl von Oettingen-Wallerstein).

== Career ==
Upon the death of his father, aged 44, in 1816, he became the 8th Prince of Lobkowicz, however, the family's Imperial immediacy over Princely county of Störnstein in the Holy Roman Empire had been mediatized to Bavaria in 1807. As such, the House of Lobkowicz belong to the small group of families that constitute the Hochadel (German for 'high nobility'). In 1825, Ferdinand Joseph was able solidify the family's princely status by obtaining the honorific title of Durchlaucht ("Serene Highness"). While its usage was initially for the head of the family, it was extended to all members of the senior line in 1869. As Ferdinand had many brothers, the family estates were divided thereby creating several new subsidiary lines: Prince Johann Nepomuk founding the line of Křinice, Prince Joseph Franz founding the line of Dolní Beřkovice (and serving as Head of Household of the Empress Elisabeth), Prince Ludwig Johann founding a line in Hungary, and Prince Karl Johann serving as Governor of Lower Austria, Moravia, and of Tyrol.

The prince embraced the entrepreneurial spirit of the times and opened a substantial sugar factory in the town of Bílina.

=== Political career ===
As one of sixteen mediatized princely houses, he was a hereditary member of the Austrian House of Lords from 1861 until his death in 1868. It was the upper house of the Imperial Council, the bicameral legislature of the Austrian Empire (and of the Cisleithanian half of Austria-Hungary upon the Compromise of 1867).

Also from 1861 onwards, he was a member of the Bohemian Diet (the parliament of the Kingdom of Bohemia within the Austro-Hungarian Empire that existed between 1861 and Czechoslovak independence in 1918).

== Personal life ==
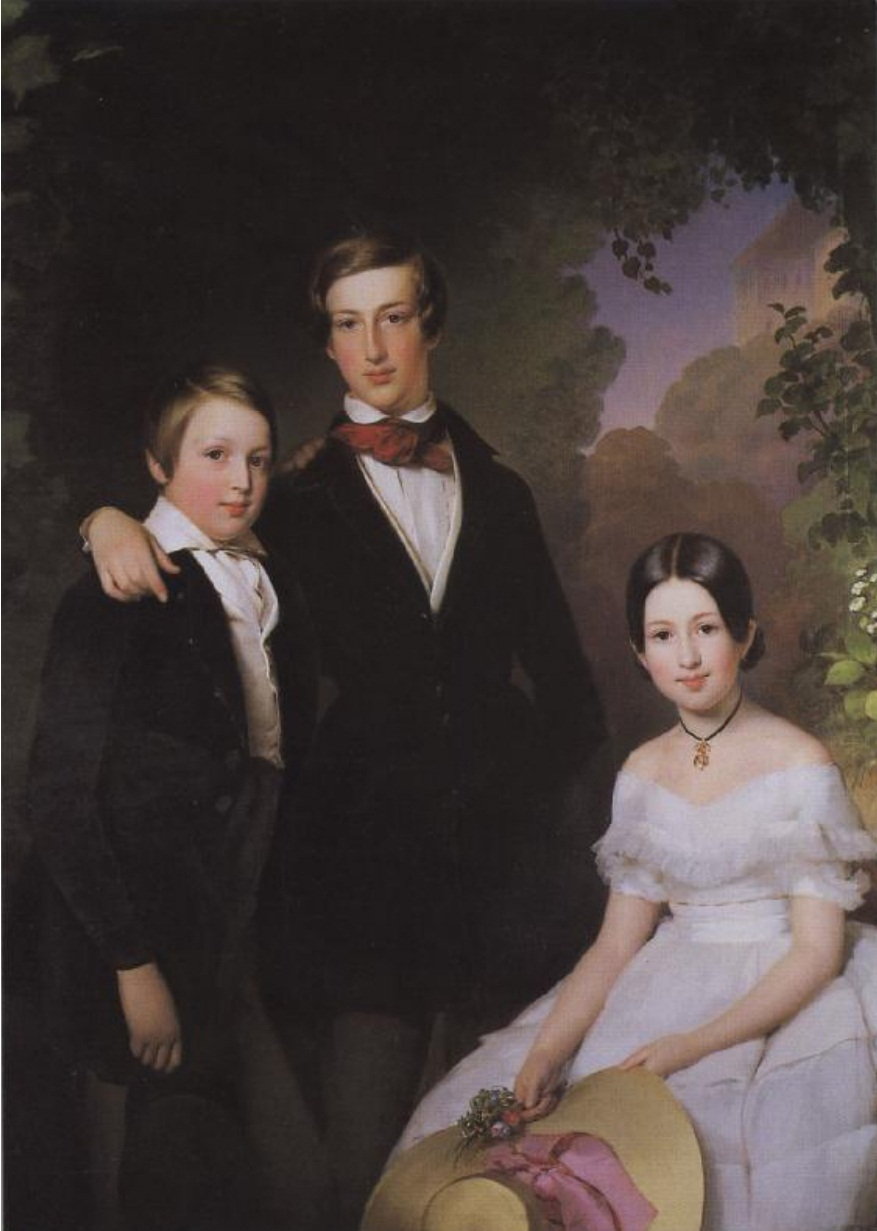
Portrait of his three eldest children, Maximilian, Moritz and Leopoldine, by Franz Schrotzberg, 1844

In 1826, he married Princess Marie von und zu Liechtenstein (1808–1871), a daughter of Prince Moritz of Liechtenstein (a son of Prince Karl Borromäus of Liechtenstein) and Princess Maria Léopoldine Josepha Aloysia Esterházy de Galántha. His younger brother, Prince Ludwig Johann, married Princess Marie's sister, Princess Léopoldine. Together, they were the parents of:

- Prince Maximilian Maria Osvald von Lobkowicz (1827–1849), who died unmarried.
- Moritz Aloys Joseph Marcelinus, 9th Prince of Lobkowicz (1831–1903), who married Princess Maria Anna of Oettingen-Wallerstein, a daughter of Friedrich Kraft, 3rd Prince of Oettingen-Wallerstein and Maria Anna von Trauttmansdorff-Weinsberg.
- Princess Léopoldine Louise Gabrielle von Lobkowicz (1835–1892), who married the Austrian Count Friedrich Bossi-Fedrigotti, a son of Count Lodovico Bossi-Fedrigotti von Ochsenfeld and Giuseppina de Rosmini.
- Princess Marie Léopoldine Aloisia von Lobkowicz (1841–1870), who married Gebhard Lebrecht, 3rd Prince Blücher of Wahlstatt, a great-grandson of the noted General, Prince Gebhard Leberecht von Blücher. After her death in 1870, he married Elisabeth von Perponcher-Sedlnitzky. After her death in 1894, he married Princess Wanda Ada Radziwiłł.

The Prince died on 18 December 1868 in Vienna. As his eldest son predeceased him in 1849, he was succeeded in his titles by his second son, Moritz.

=== Descendants ===
Through his son Moritz, he was a grandfather of Ferdinand, 10th Prince of Lobkowicz (1858–1938), who served as the penultimate Vice President of the Austrian House of Lords (succeeding Prince Alois Schönburg-Hartenstein) from 12 October 1917 until 12 November 1918 (when he was succeeded by Count Ernst of Silva-Tarouca).

Through his daughter Marie, he was a grandfather of Gebhard, 4th Prince Blücher of Wahlstatt (1865–1931), who married Englishwoman Evelyn Stapleton-Bretherton (a granddaughter of William Petre, 12th Baron Petre), in 1907.
