= Joseph Franz Karl von Lobkowicz =

Austrian nobleman (1803–1875)

Prince Ferdinand Joseph von Lobkowitz
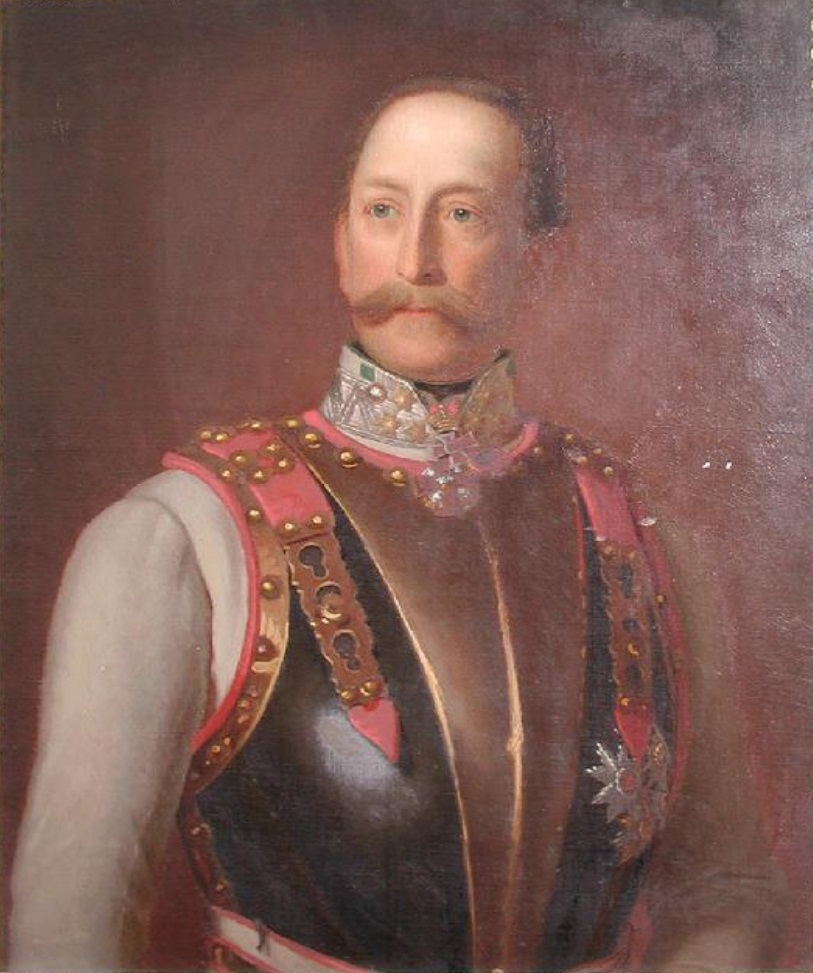
- Portrait of Prince Lobkowitz by Franz Schrotzberg, c. 1865
- Born: 17 February 1803; Vienna, Archduchy of Austria, Holy Roman Empire
- Died: 18 March 1875 (aged 72); Prague, Austria-Hungary
- Spouse: Countess Antonie Kinsky von Wchinitz und Tettau (died 1835) Princess Sidonia von Lobkovicz (died 1875)
- Issue Detail: Prince Ferdinand von Lobkowicz; Princess Bertha von Lobkowicz; Princess Josephine Maria von Lobkowicz; Princess Maria Gabriele von Lobkowicz; Princess Elisabeth von Lobkowicz; Prince Zdenko von Lobkowicz; Prince Georg Ferdinand von Lobkowicz; Princess Maria Rosa von Lobkowicz; Princess Anna von Lobkowicz
- House: Lobkowicz
- Father: Joseph Franz von Lobkowitz
- Mother: Maria Karolina von Schwarzenberg

Prince Joseph Franz Karl von Lobkowicz (17 February 1803 – 18 March 1875) was an Austrian nobleman who served as Head of Household of the Empress Elisabeth of Austria.

== Early life ==
Prince Joseph Franz was born 17 February 1803 in Vienna. He was a youngers son, of twelve children, born to Joseph Franz, 7th Prince of Lobkowitz (1772–1816) and Princess Maria Karolina von Schwarzenberg (1775–1816).

His paternal grandparents were Ferdinand Philipp, 6th Prince Lobkowicz (son of Phillip Hyacinth, 4th Prince of Lobkowicz) and Princess Maria Gabriella di Savoia-Carignano (a daughter of Louis Victor, Prince of Carignano and Princess Christine of Hesse-Rotenburg). His maternal grandparents were Johann I, Prince of Schwarzenberg and Countess Maria Eleonore zu Oettingen-Wallerstein (a daughter of Count Philipp Karl von Oettingen-Wallerstein). His maternal uncle was Joseph II, Prince of Schwarzenberg.

== Career ==
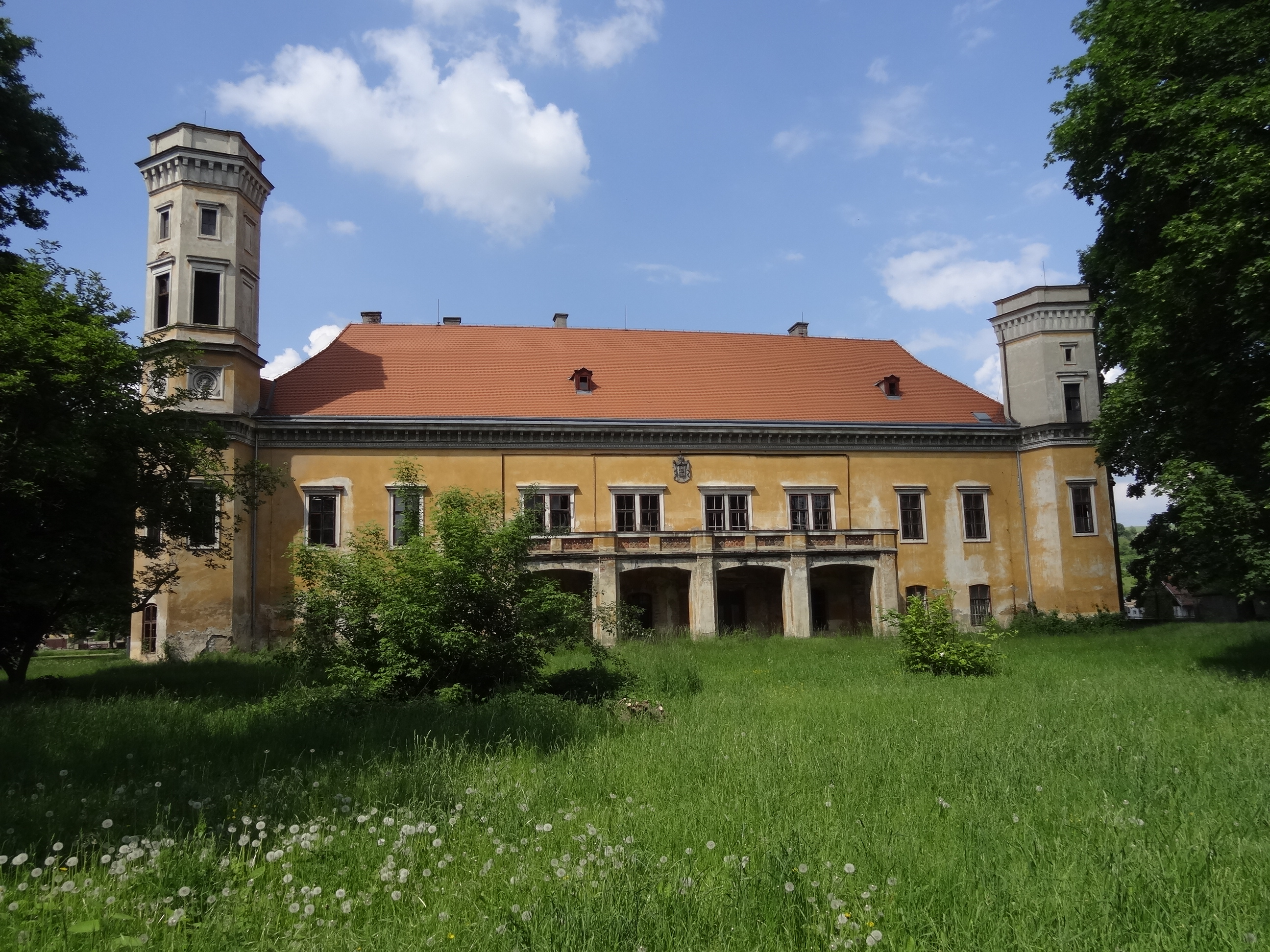
Dolní Beřkovice Castle

Upon the death of his father in 1816, his elder brother, Ferdinand Joseph, became the 8th Prince of Lobkowitz, however, the family's Imperial immediacy over Princely county of Störnstein in the Holy Roman Empire had been mediatized to Bavaria in 1807. As he was just one of many sons, the family estates were divided amongst the brothers, thereby creating several new subsidiary lines with Prince Johann Nepomuk founding the line of Křinice, Prince Ludwig Johann founding a line in Hungary, and Prince Karl Johann serving as Governor of Lower Austria, Moravia, and of Tyrol.

Prince Joseph Franz, who served as Head of Household of the Empress Elisabeth founded the line of Dolní Beřkovice near the old Lobkowicz land in north-central Bohemia, located on the Elbe river. His seat, Dolní Beřkovice Castle, was rebuilt in the mid-19th century.

== Personal life ==
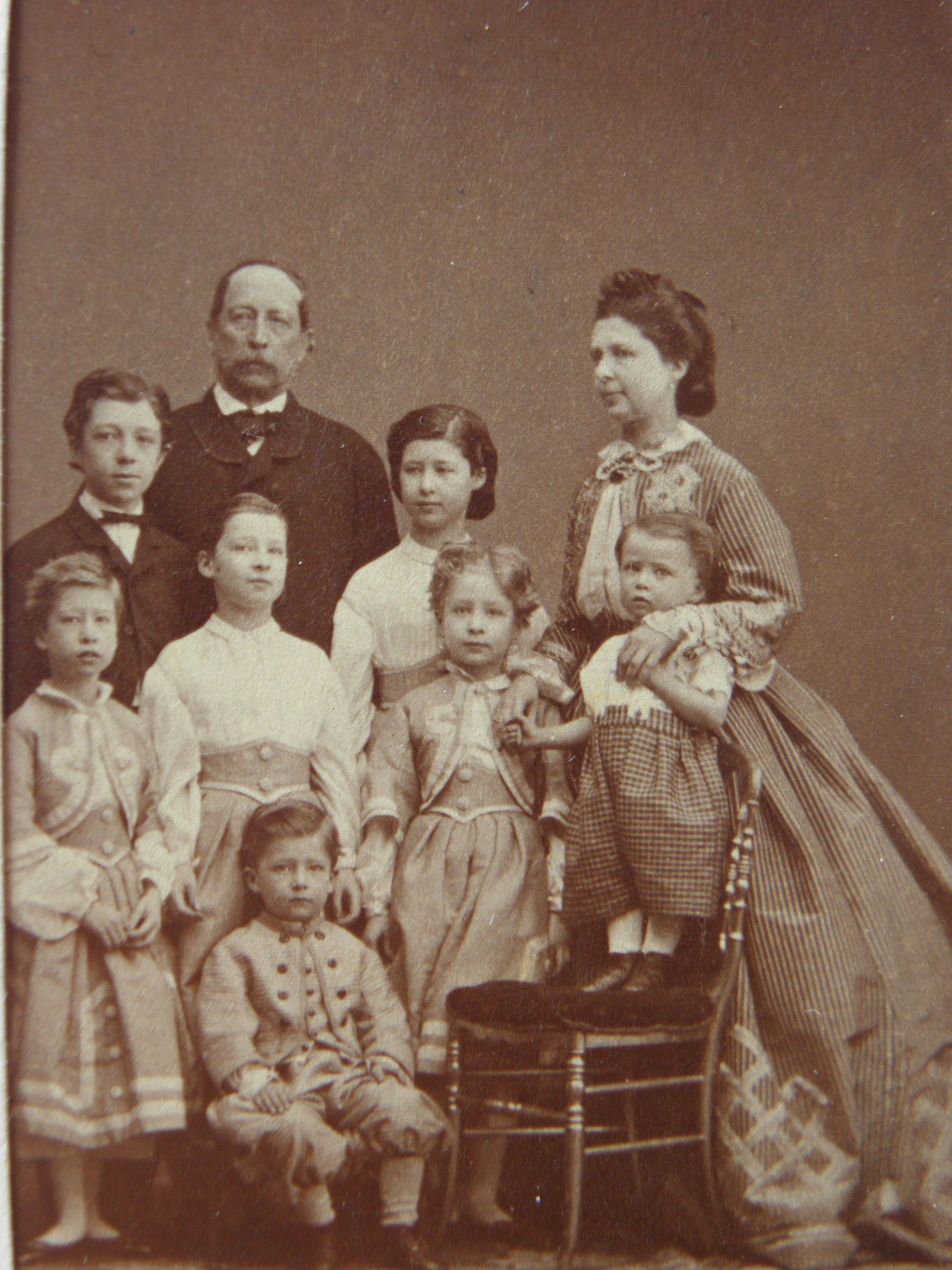
Prince Joseph Franz with his second wife and their children

Prince Joseph Franz married Countess Antonie Kinsky von Wchinitz und Tettau (1815–1835), a daughter of Count Karl Kinsky von Wchinitz und Tettau and Countess Elisabeth von Thun und Hohenstein. She died in Pardubice in 1835.

After her death, he married Princess Maria "Sidonia" von Lobkovicz (1828–1917), a daughter of Prince August von Lobkowicz and Princess Bertha of Schwarzenberg (a first cousin of Prince Joseph Franz as her father, Joseph II, Prince of Schwarzenberg, was his mother's brother). Together, they were the parents of:

- Prince Ferdinand von Lobkowicz (1850–1926), who married Countess Ida Podstatzky von Lichtenstein, a daughter of Count Leopold Podstatzky-Lichtenstein and Countess Franziska Paar.
- Princess Bertha von Lobkowicz (1851–1887), who married Count Friedrich Franz von Brühl, a son of Count Friedrich von Brühl and Countess Marie von Spee.
- Princess Josephine Maria von Lobkowicz (1853–1898), who married Count Ludwig von Arco-Zinneberg, a son Count Maximilian von Arco-Zinneberg and Countess Leopoldine von Waldburg-Zeil-Trauchburg.
- Princess Maria Gabriele von Lobkowicz (1855–1917), who married Count Clemens von Korff genannt Schmising-Kerssenbrock, son of Count Clemens August von Korff genannt Schmising-Kerssenbrock and Baroness Karoline von Fürstenberg-Herdringen.
- Princess Elisabeth von Lobkowicz (1856–1936), who married Dr. Franz Adolf von Morsey genannt Picard, a son of William von Morsey genannt Picard and Countess Maria Isabella of Stolberg-Stolberg.
- Prince Zdenko von Lobkowicz (1858–1933), who married Countess Pauline von Schönborn-Weisentheid, a daughter of Erwein, 2nd Count of Schönborn-Wiesentheid and Countess Christina von Brühl.
- Prince Maria August Georg Ferdinand von Lobkowicz (1862–1921), who married Mária 'Irma' Pálffy of Erdőd, a daughter of Karl Eduard Pálffy ab Erdöd and Maria Eleonore von Walterskirchen.
- Princess Maria Rosa "Ruzena" von Lobkowicz (1867–1900), who married Baron Gordian von Gudenus, son of Baron Ernst Ferdinand von Gudenus and Countess Anna Maria Auguste von Schönborn.
- Princess Anna von Lobkowicz (1867–1957), who married Carl Philipp, 4th Prince of Wrede, a son of Carl Friedrich, 3rd Prince von Wrede and Countess Helene von Vieregg.

Prince Joseph Franz died on 18 March 1875 in Prague.

=== Descendants ===
Through his son, Prince Georg Ferdinand, he was a grandfather of Prince Edouard Josef von Lobkowicz (1899–1959), who married American heiress Anita Lihme; they were the parents of Prince Edouard de Lobkowicz (1926–2010), who married Princess Marie-Françoise of Bourbon-Parma, the eldest daughter of Prince Xavier of Bourbon-Parma and of his wife, Madeleine de Bourbon-Busset. Their first son, Prince Edouard-Xavier de Lobkowicz, was found dead in Paris in 1984.
