= Johann Nepomuk von Lobkowicz =

Bohemian nobleman (1799–1878)

Prince Johann Nepomuk von Lobkowicz
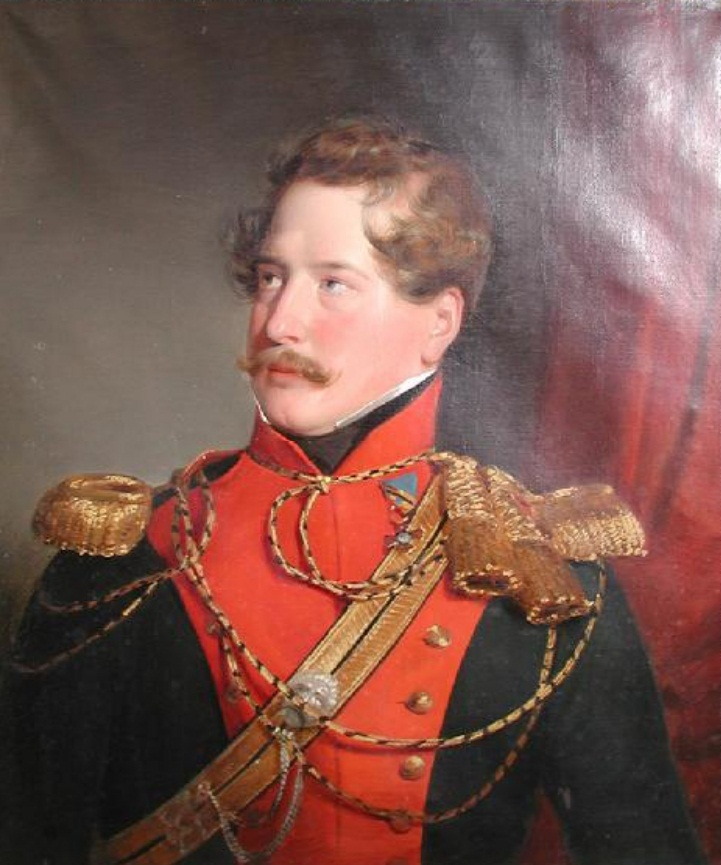
- Portrait of Prince Lobkowicz by Franz Schrotzberg, 1844
- Born: Johann Nepomuk Karl Philipp von Lobkowicz; 14 January 1799; Vienna, Archduchy of Austria, Holy Roman Empire
- Died: 6 June 1878 (aged 79); Konopiště, Austria-Hungary
- Spouse: Karolina von Wrbna und Freudenthal (died 1843)
- House: Lobkowicz
- Father: Joseph Franz von Lobkowicz
- Mother: Maria Karolina von Schwarzenberg

Prince Johann Nepomuk Karl Philipp von Lobkowicz (14 January 1799 – 6 June 1878) was a Bohemian nobleman. He was an imperial-royal chamberlain and a reserve major. He became a knight of the Sicilian Military Order of San Giorgio della Reunione.

== Early life ==
Prince Joseph Franz was born 14 January 1799 in Vienna. He was the second son of twelve children, born to Joseph Franz, 7th Prince of Lobkowicz (1772–1816) and Princess Maria Karolina von Schwarzenberg (1775–1816).

His paternal grandparents were Ferdinand Philipp, 6th Prince Lobkowicz (son of Phillip Hyacinth, 4th Prince of Lobkowicz) and Princess Maria Gabriella di Savoia-Carignano (a daughter of Louis Victor, Prince of Carignano and Princess Christine of Hesse-Rotenburg). His maternal grandparents were Johann I, Prince of Schwarzenberg and Countess Maria Eleonore zu Oettingen-Wallerstein (a daughter of Count Philipp Karl von Oettingen-Wallerstein). His maternal uncle was Joseph II, Prince of Schwarzenberg.

== Career ==
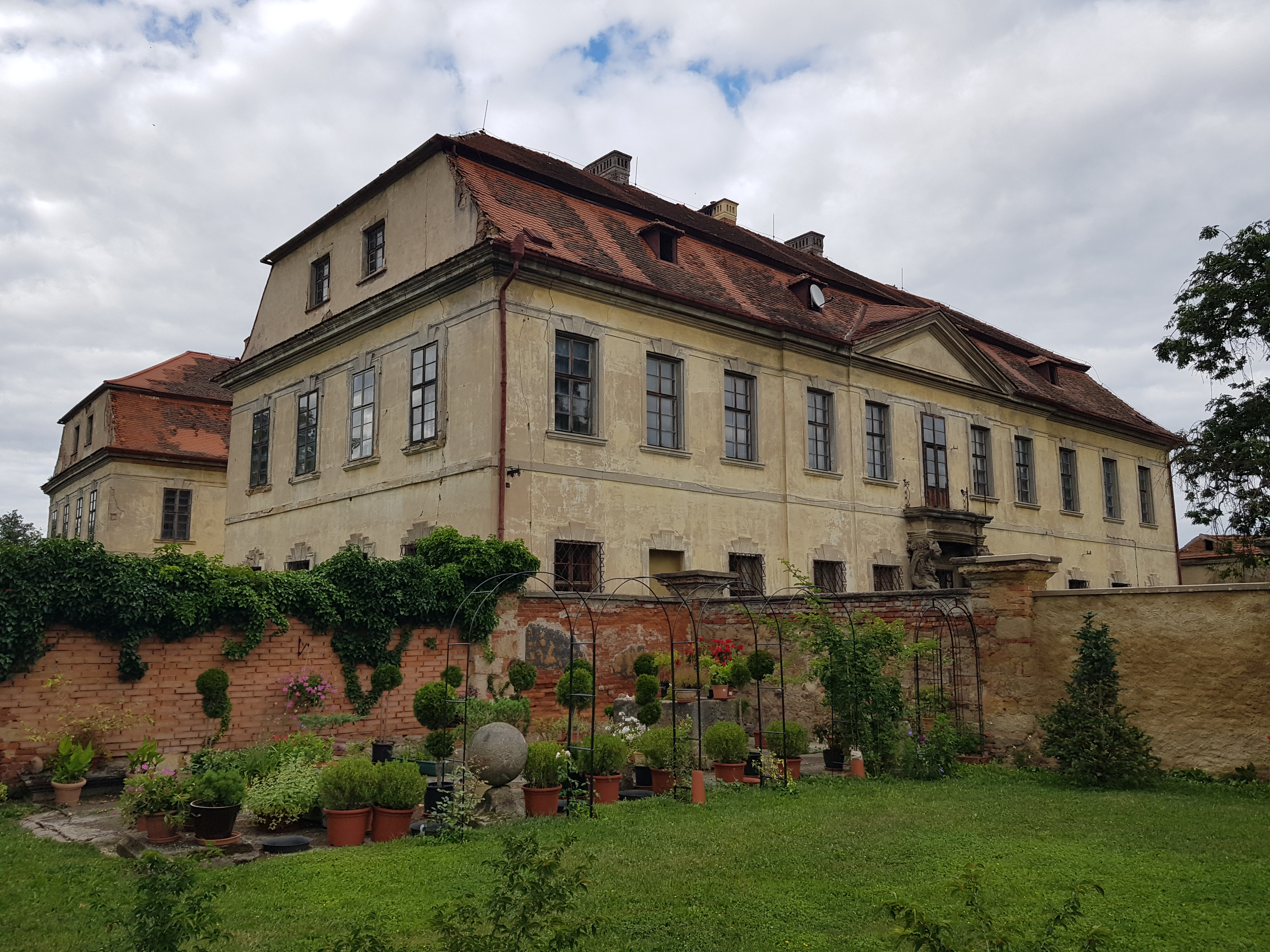
Křimice Castle

Upon the death of his father in 1816, his elder brother, Ferdinand Joseph, became the 8th Prince of Lobkowicz, however, the family's Imperial immediacy over Princely county of Störnstein in the Holy Roman Empire had been mediatized to Bavaria in 1807. As he was just one of many sons, the family estates were divided amongst the brothers, thereby creating several new subsidiary lines with Prince Ludwig Johann founding a line in Hungary, Prince Joseph Franz founding the line of Dolní Beřkovice (and serving as Head of Household of the Empress Elisabeth), and Prince Karl Johann serving as Governor of Lower Austria, Moravia, and of Tyrol.

As the second-born of the older princely line of the Lobkowicz family, Johann inherited the Týnec nad Sázavou porcelain factory. Established in 1793 within the castle and brewery at Týnec nad Sázavou, this factory became renowned for its high-quality porcelain production. The factory specialized in Wedgwood-style ceramics and dishes adorned with copper engravings. Notably, its exhibits received a bronze medal at the 1836 Prague Exhibition and garnered honorable mentions at the Vienna Exhibitions in 1839 and 1845.

Prince Johann Nepomuk founded the line of Křimice (today a borough of Plzeň). His seat, Křimice Castle, was inherited by the last Count of Wrtby in 1830.

== Personal life ==
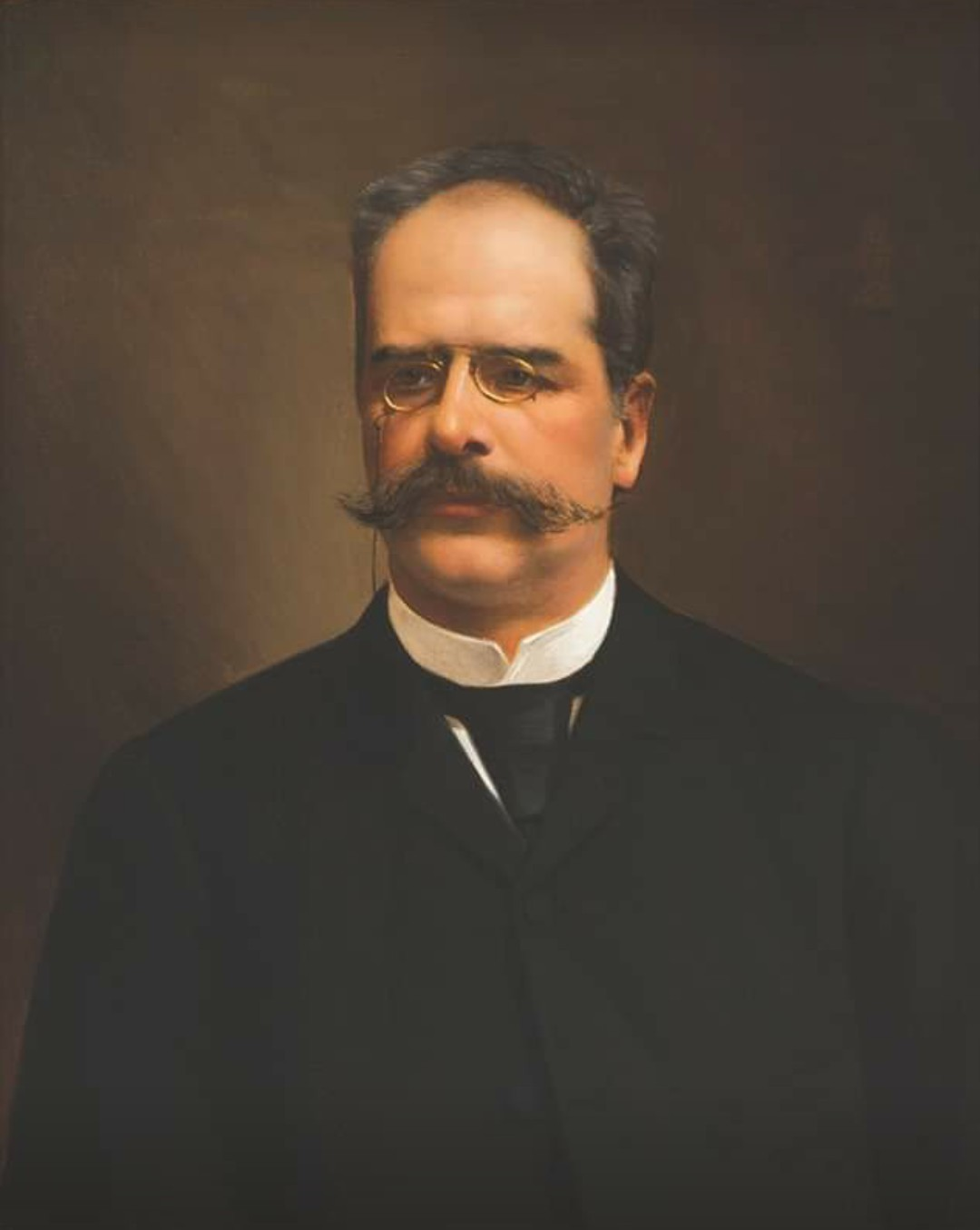
Portrait of his son, Prince Franz Eugen

He married Karolina von Wrbna und Freudenthal (1815–1843), a daughter of Eugen von Wrbna und Freudenthal and Mária Borbála Erdõdy de Monyorókerék et Monoszló. Together, they were the parents of:

- Princess Caroline von Lobkowicz (1835–1881), who married Count Philipp Schenk von Stauffenberg, a son of Count Franz Ludwig Philipp Schenk von Stauffenberg and Countess Eleonore Butler von Clonebough.
- Princess Maria Margareta von Lobkowicz (1837–1870), who married her cousin, Johann Nepomuk von Harrach zu Rohrau und Thannhausen, son of Count Franz Ernst von Harrach-Rohrau-Thannhausen and Princess Anna von Lobkowicz (a daughter of 7th Prince of Lobkowicz).
- Prince Franz Eugen of Lobkowicz (1839–1898), who married Countess Kunigunde von Sternberg, a daughter of Count Zdenko von Sternberg and Countess Theresia von Stadion zu Thannhausen.
- Princess Johanna von Lobkowicz (1840–1872), who married Count Karl Friedrich von Schönborn, a son of Erwein, 2nd Count of Schönborn and Countess Christina von Brühl.

Prince Johann Nepomuk died in Konopiště on 6 June 1878.

=== Descendants ===
Through his only son Prince Franz Eugen, he was a grandfather of Jaroslav, 11th Prince of Lobkowicz (1877–1953), who became the 11th Prince of Lobkowicz in 1938, after the death of his cousin, Ferdinand, 10th Prince, who had renounced his succession rights in 1920.
