= Joseph Franz von Lobkowitz =

Austrian general and patron of music (1772–1816)

- Prince of Lobkowitz
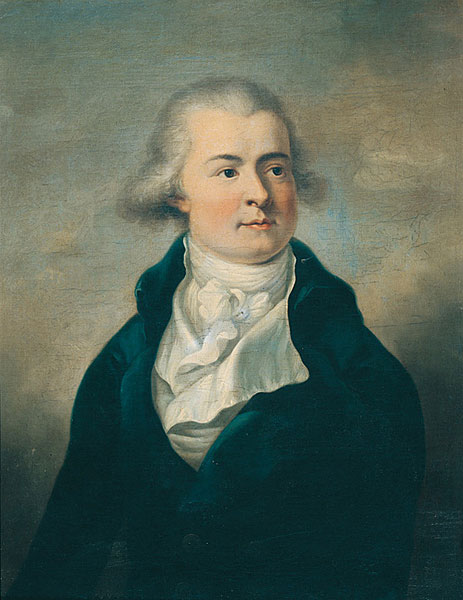
- Portrait of Franz Joseph Maximilian von Lobkowicz by August Friedrich Oelenhainz (18th century)
- Born: 8 December 1772; Vienna
- Died: 16 December 1816 (aged 44); Třeboň, South Bohemia
- Spouse: Maria Karolina von Schwarzenberg (m. 1792; died 1816)
- Issue Detail: Princess Gabriella von Lobkovicz; Princess Maria Eleonora Carolina von Lobkovicz; Ferdinand Joseph von Lobkowicz; Johann Nepomuk von Lobkowicz; Joseph Franz Karl von Lobkowicz; Ludwig Johann Karl Alois Carl von Lobkowicz; Anna von Lobkowicz; Sidonia Karolina von Lobkowicz; Karl Johann von Lobkowicz
- House: Lobkowicz
- Father: Prince Ferdinand Philipp von Lobkowicz
- Mother: Princess Maria Gabriella of Savoy-Carignano

Joseph Franz Maximilian, 7th Prince of Lobkowitz (also spelled Lobkowicz) (8 December 1772 – 16 December 1816) was an aristocrat of Bohemia, from the House of Lobkowicz. He is known particularly for his interest in music and as a patron of Ludwig van Beethoven.

== Early life ==
He was born in Vienna, son of Ferdinand Philipp Joseph, 6th Prince Lobkowicz (1724–1784) and Princess Maria Gabriella of Savoy-Carignano (1748–1828). In 1786 Emperor Joseph II made him Duke of Roudnice (Herzog von Raudnitz in German, vévoda roudnický in Czech).

His paternal grandparents were Phillip Hyacinth, 4th Prince of Lobkowicz, and Countess Anna Maria von Althann. Joseph Franz's father succeeded his brother, Wenzel Ferdinand, as reigning Prince of Lobkowitz in 1739. His maternal grandparents were Louis Victor, Prince of Carignano and Princess Christine of Hesse-Rotenburg (daughter of Ernst II Leopold, Landgrave of Hesse-Rotenburg).

== Patron of music ==
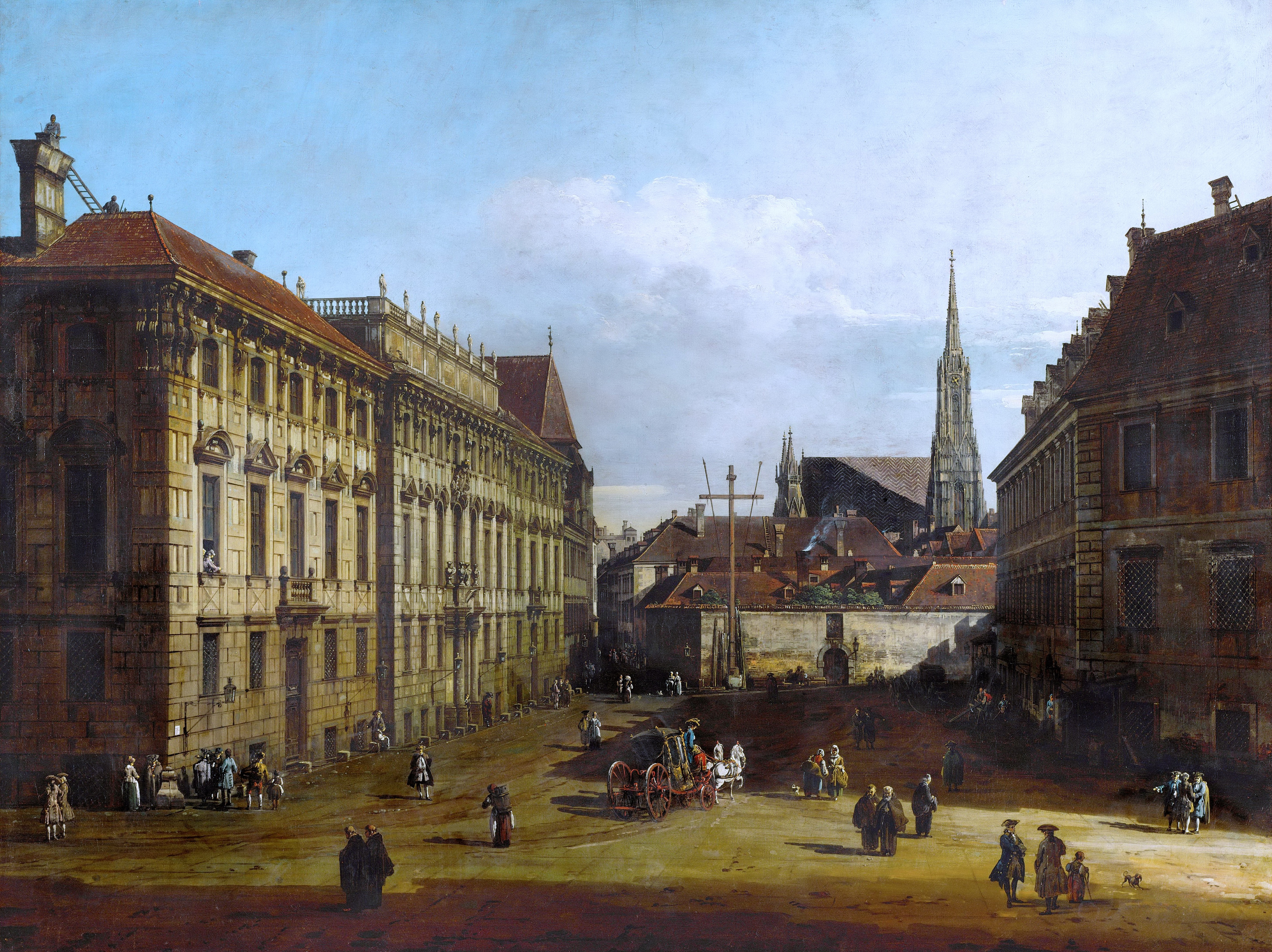
Palais Lobkowitz (on the left) in Vienna; painting by Canaletto, about 1760

The prince was an amateur musician, playing violin and cello, and sang with a bass voice. Countess Lulu Thürheim, sister-in-law of Prince Razumowsky, said of him: "This Prince was as kindhearted as a child and the most foolish music enthusiast. He played music from dusk to dawn and spent a fortune on musicians. Innumerable musicians gathered in his house, whom he treated regally."

He was a member of the Gesellschaft der Associierten, an important concert-sponsoring organization of his time which sponsored, among other events, the 1798 premiere of Joseph Haydn's The Creation.

In 1799, Lobkowitz commissioned a set of six string quartets from Haydn. The composer was both busy and in ill health, and he managed to complete only two of them; these were published as the composer's Opus 77 and were the last quartets he was to complete.

Lobkowitz had a private orchestra at his palace in Vienna, the Palais Lobkowitz; in the hall of the palace, this orchestra performed in 1804 Beethoven's Symphony No. 3 (which was dedicated to the Prince) before the first public performance.

In 1808, Beethoven was offered the post of Kapellmeister at Cassel, where Jérôme Bonaparte, King of Westphalia, had his court. Prince Lobkowitz, together with Archduke Rudolph and Prince Kinsky, successfully persuaded Beethoven to stay in Vienna by offering a yearly pension of 4,000 florins. In 1811 Prince Lobkowitz, in financial difficulty, discontinued paying his share. However, he eventually resumed payment, which continued past his death in 1816 until Beethoven's own death in 1827.

Beethoven dedicated several works to the Prince: his third, fifth and sixth symphonies; his String Quartets Op. 18 and String Quartet Op. 74; the Triple Concerto and the song cycle An die ferne Geliebte.

Beethoven composed a Birthday Cantata for Prince Lobkowitz (WoO 106); it was written for the composer's friend Karl Peters, tutor for the Lobkowitz family. It was intended to be sung by the young Princes on their father's birthday in 1816. However, the prince was seriously ill at that time, and died a few days later.

== Personal life ==
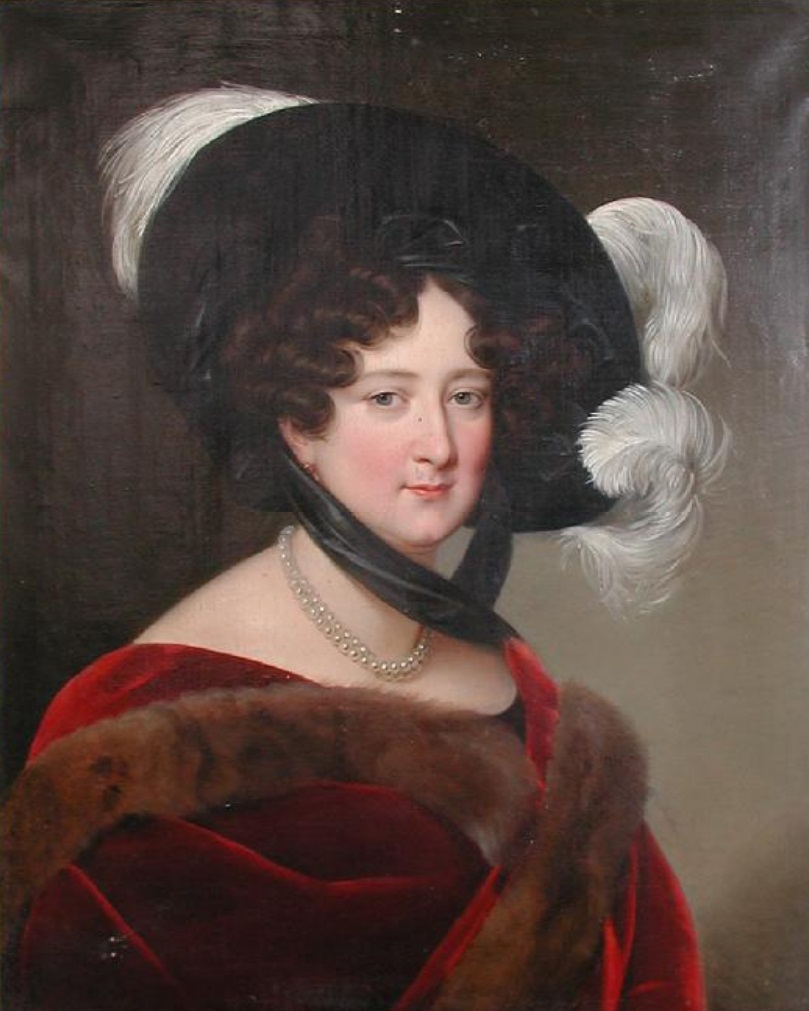
Portrait of his daughter, Marie Gabrielle, Princess of Auersperg, by Franz Schrotzberg, 1843

In 1792 he married Maria Karolina von Schwarzenberg (1775–1816), daughter of Johann I, Prince of Schwarzenberg and Countess Maria Eleonore zu Oettingen-Wallerstein (a daughter of Count Philipp Karl von Oettingen-Wallerstein). They had twelve children, including:

- Princess Gabriella von Lobkovicz (1793–1893), who married Prince Vincenz Nepomuk von Auersperg, youngest son of Prince Wilhelm I of Auersperg.
- Princess Maria Eleonora Carolina von Lobkovicz (1795–1876), who married Weriand, Prince of Windisch-Graetz, a son of Count Joseph Nicholas of Windisch-Graetz. Maria Eleonora and Weriand are the parents of Hugo, 2nd Prince of Windisch-Graetz.
- Ferdinand Joseph, 8th Prince of Lobkovicz (1797–1868), who married Princess Maria of Liechtenstein, a daughter of Prince Moritz Joseph of Liechtenstein (a son of Prince Karl Borromäus of Liechtenstein) and Princess Maria Leopoldine Josepha Aloysia Esterházy de Galántha.
- Prince Johann Nepomuk Karl Philipp von Lobkovicz (1799–1878), who married Karolina von Wrbna und Freudenthal, a daughter of Eugen von Wrbna und Freudenthal.
- Prince Joseph Franz Karl von Lobkowicz (1803–1875), who married Countess Antonie Kinsky von Wchinitz und Tettau. After her death in 1835, he married Maria "Sidonia" von Lobkowicz, a daughter of August, Prince von Lobkowicz and Bertha, Princess of Schwarzenberg.
- Prince Ludwig Johann Karl Alois Carl von Lobkowicz (1807–1882), who married Léopoldine von Liechtenstein, also a daughter of Moritz Joseph von Liechtenstein.
- Princess Anna von Lobkowicz (1809–1881), who married Count Franz Ernst von Harrach zu Rohrau und Thannhausen.
- Princess Sidonia Karolina von Lobkowicz (1812–1880), who married Count Ferdinánd III Lipót Pálffy-Daun von Erdöd.
- Prince Karl Johann von Lobkowicz (1814–1879), who married Julie von Redwitz.

He died 1816 in Třeboň in South Bohemia, and was buried in Roudnice nad Labem.

=== Descendants ===
Through his daughter, Princess Gabriella, he is a direct ancestor of Princess Michael of Kent (née Baroness Marie-Christine von Reibnitz), the wife of Prince Michael of Kent, who is a grandson of King George V.

== Ancestors ==
Ancestors of Joseph Franz von Lobkowitz

16. Václav Eusebius, Prince Lobkowicz, Duke of Sagan
8. Ferdinand August, Prince Lobkowicz, Duke of Sagan
17. Countess Palatine Auguste Sophie von Sulzbach
4. Phillip Hyazinth, Prince Lobkowicz, Duke of Sagan
18. Maurice Henry, Prince of Nassau-Hadamar
9. Countess Claudia Francisca of Nassau-Hadamar
19. Countess Ernestine Charlotte of Nassau-Siegen
2. Ferdinand Philipp, Prince Lobkowicz, Duke of Sagan
20. Count Wenzel Michael Franz of Althann
10. Count Michael Ferdinand of Althann
21. Countess Anna Maria Elisabeth of Aspremont-Lynden
5. Countess Anna Maria of Althann
22. Karel Maxmilián Lažanský z Bukové
11. Countess Marie Eleonora Lazansky
23. Anna Elisabeth Spandko von Spankau
1. Joseph Franz von Lobkowitz
24. Emmanuel Philibert, Prince of Carignano
12. Victor Amadeus I, Prince of Carignano
25. Maria Angela Caterina, Princess d'Este
6. Louis Victor, Prince of Carignano
26. Victor Amadeus II of Sardinia
13. Princesse Maria Vittoria of Savoy
27. Jeanne Baptiste d'Albert de Luynes, Comtesse de Verrue
3. Princess Gabriella of Savoy-Carignano
28. William, Landgrave of Hesse-Rotenburg
14. Ernest Leopold, Landgrave of Hesse-Rotenburg
29. Countess Maria Anna of Löwenstein-Wertheim-Rochefort
7. Landgravine Christine of Hesse-Rotenburg
30. Maximilian Karl Albert, Prince of Löwenstein-Wertheim-Rochefort
15. Princess Eleonore of Löwenstein-Wertheim
31. Countess Maria Polyxena Khuen von Lichtenberg und Belasi
