= Zdenko Lobkowitz =

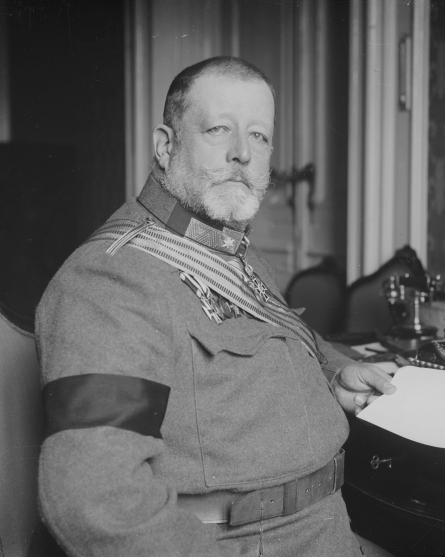
Zdenko Lobkowitz

Zdenko Lobkowitz (full name Maria Zdenko Vinzenz Kaspar, Prince of Lobkowitz; 5 May 1858 – 13 August 1933) was an Austrian officer in the Common Army of Austria-Hungary and a confidant of its last Emperor-King, Charles I. He was a member of the princely Lobkowicz family, an old Bohemian noble family.

== Biography ==
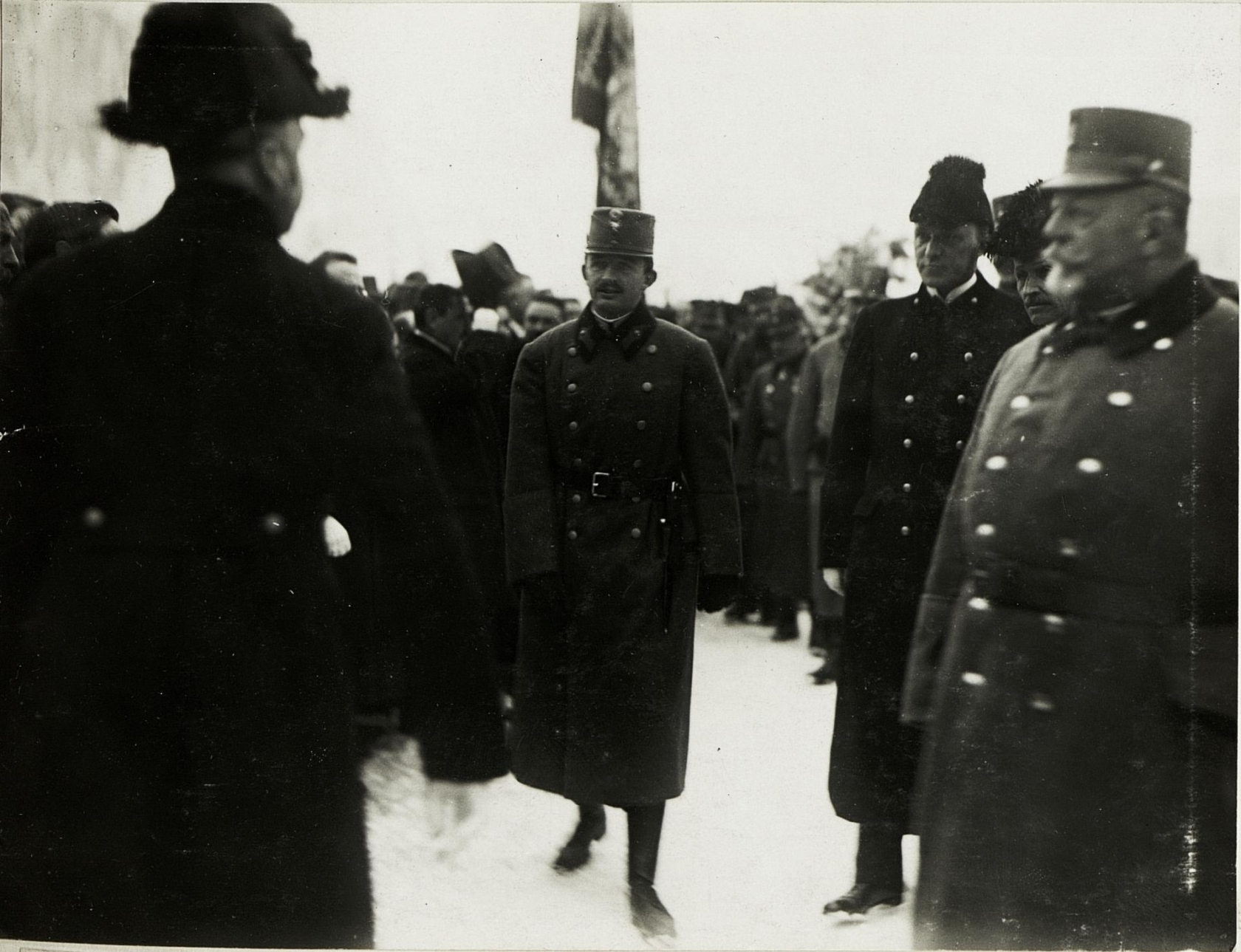
Zdenko von Lobkowitz accompanies Emperor Karl I on a visit to Trento.

Zdenko Lobkowitz was born on 5 May 1858 in Vienna. He was one of the ten children of Cavalry General Joseph Franz Karl Prince of Lobkowicz (1803–1875) and his second wife, Maria Sidonia of Lobkowicz (1828–1917).

After attending the gymnasium, in July 1876 the Prince joined the 14th Dragoon Regiment (Prince of Windisch-Graetz's Own), which was then stationed in Kőszeg in western Hungary. In 1878 he passed the cadet examination and became a lieutenant in the 1st Dragoon Regiment (Emperor Francis I's Own) at Stanislau in Galicia, where he served until May 1901. He was promoted to Rittmeister in 1890. He then served in the 7th Dragoon Regiment (Duke of Lorraine's Own) in Brandýs nad Labem. In 1902 he became a major and in 1906 a lieutenant colonel.

From 18 August 1907, after his career as an officer, he acted as head of chambers for Archduke Karl Franz Josef, who was 29 years his junior and who had interrupted his military service in Brandýs nad Labem in Bohemia to study in Prague. The Archduke, then number two in the line of succession, behind Franz Ferdinand of Austria-Este, became the direct heir to the throne of Emperor Franz Joseph I with the murder of Franz Ferdinand on 28 June 1914 and succeeded him on 21 November 1916 as Emperor Karl I. after. In this capacity he promoted Zdenko Lobkowitz on 24 November 1916 to his Adjutant General and appointed him Field Marshal Lieutenant on 4 June 1917. Lobkowitz now accompanied the new Emperor in 1917/1918 on his frequent visits to the troops at the front. In 1918 he was awarded the Order of the Golden Fleece by the Emperor.

Due to family tradition, in November 1918, when Austria-Hungary dissolved, Zdenko Lobkowitz opted for Czechoslovak citizenship. The new republic abolished titles of nobility in December 1918. After 1918, Zdenko Lobkowitz lived in Prague-Smíchov and worked for the Catholic people's movement in Bohemia. He died on 13 August 1933 in Harrachov, at the age of 75.

== Family ==
The Prince was married to Pauline (Maria Paula) Duchess von Schönborn-Wiesenthal (1861–1922), a younger sister of the politician Friedrich von Schönborn. The couple had six children together:

- Joseph Zdenko (1884–1918)
- Zdenka (1885–1964)
- Erwein (1887–1965)
- Marie Christine (1890–1972)
- Wenzel (1893–1915)
- Bertha (1896–1959)

== Austrian military decorations ==
As of 31 December 1918

- Military Jubilee Cross 1908
- Military Jubilee Medal 1898
- Medal for Officers 2nd Class
- Bronze Military Merit Medal
- Bronze Military Merit Medal, War Decoration
- Imperial Order of Leopold Commander
- Order of the Iron Crown Knight 1st Class, War Decoration

In addition, as mentioned above, the Emperor awarded Lobkowitz the Golden Fleece, the house order of the dynasty, which was not a specifically military order:

- Order of the Golden Fleece

== Literature ==
- Rainer Egger: "Lobkowitz (Lobkowicz), Zdenko Prinz von". In: Österreichisches Biographisches Lexikon 1815–1950 (ÖBL). Vol. 5, Austrian Academy of Sciences, Vienna 1972, p. 262.
