= Ochsenfeld =

Coordinates: 47.80°N 7.21°E

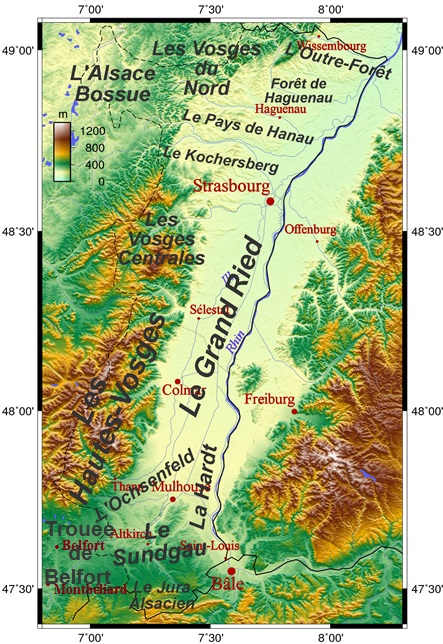
Map of the regíon. The Ochsenfeld is on the left at the bottom.

The Ochsenfeld is a plain in the Alsatian region of France. It extends from the outlet of the upper Thur valley in the west to the Hardt Forest, and from Sundgau in the south to Ensisheim in the north. The name is derived from the German words "ochsen" (oxen) and "feld" (field), meaning "cattle pasture". It refers to the fact the during the Middle Ages, the area was used entirely for animal husbandry, with many cattle markets being held there.

Ochsenfeld is also the name of a place between Cernay and Wittelsheim in the department Haut-Rhin. In this place the archaeological remains of the Battle of Vosges were found. The forces of the Roman Empire fought there against a Germanic tribe in the fiercest battle of that time. Legend has it that this battle triggered the foundation of Mulhouse. A chapel in Cernay is named after the Ochsenfeld.
