= Křinice =

- Municipality
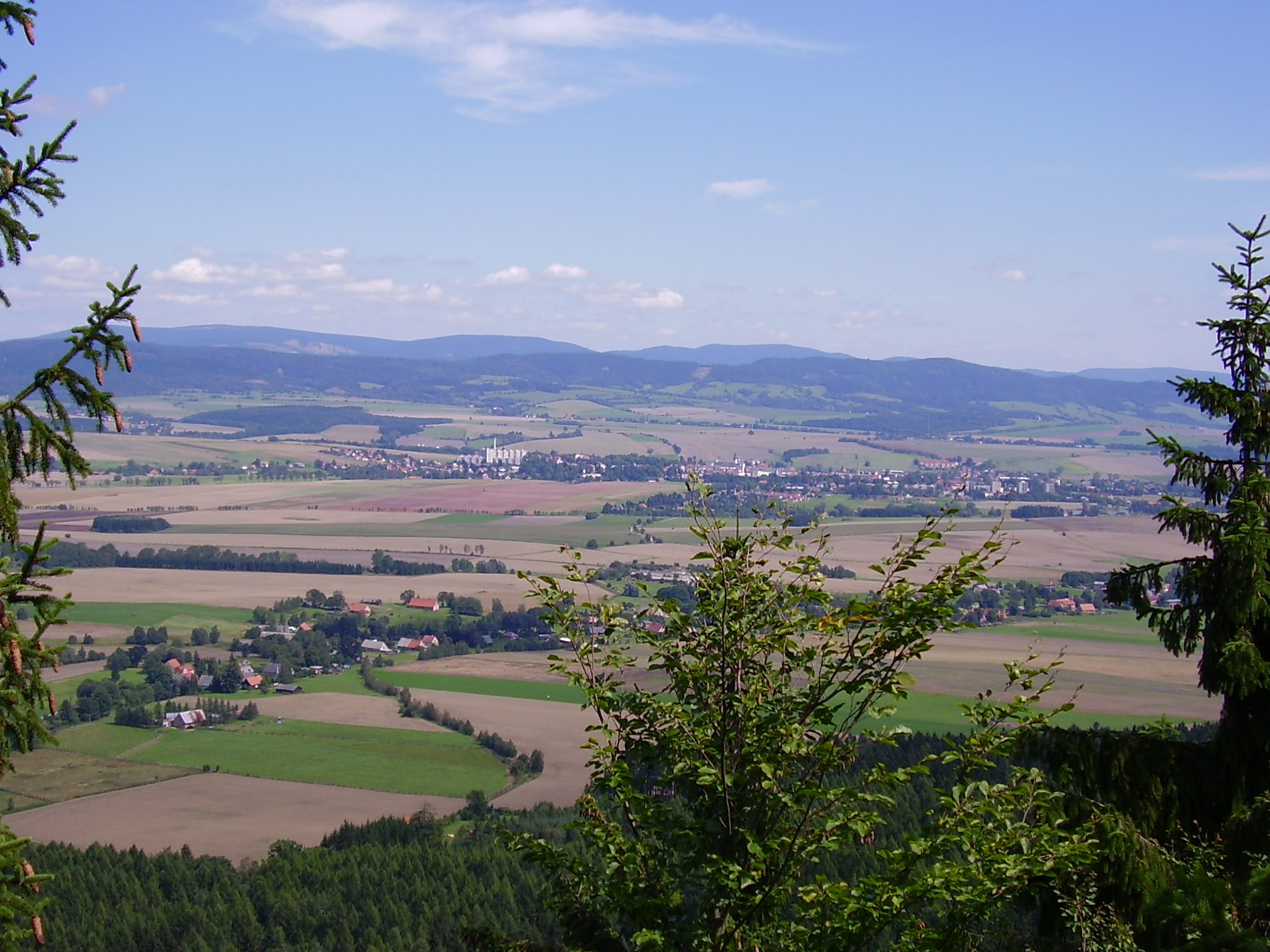
- View from the west

- Flag Coat of arms

- Location in the Czech Republic
- Coordinates: 50°34′18″N 16°18′22″E
- Country: Czech Republic
- Region: Hradec Králové
- District: Náchod
- First mentioned: 1255

Area
  - Total: 16.46 km^{2} (6.36 sq mi)
- Elevation: 395 m (1,296 ft)

Population (2026-01-01)
  - Total: 436
  - Density: 26.5/km^{2} (68.6/sq mi)
- Time zone: UTC+1 (CET)
  - Summer (DST): UTC+2 (CEST)
- Postal code: 550 01
- Website: www.krinice.cz

Křinice (German: Weckersdorf) is a municipality and village in Náchod District in the Hradec Králové Region of the Czech Republic. It has about 400 inhabitants.

== Demographics ==
Historical population
Year	Pop.	±%
1869	1,431	—
1880	1,354	−5.4%
1890	1,248	−7.8%
1900	1,262	+1.1%
1910	1,342	+6.3%
1921	1,365	+1.7%
1930	1,132	−17.1%
1950	548	−51.6%
1961	516	−5.8%
1970	470	−8.9%
1980	400	−14.9%
1991	382	−4.5%
2001	373	−2.4%
2011	406	+8.8%
2021	424	+4.4%
Source: Censuses
