= Dolní Beřkovice =

- Municipality
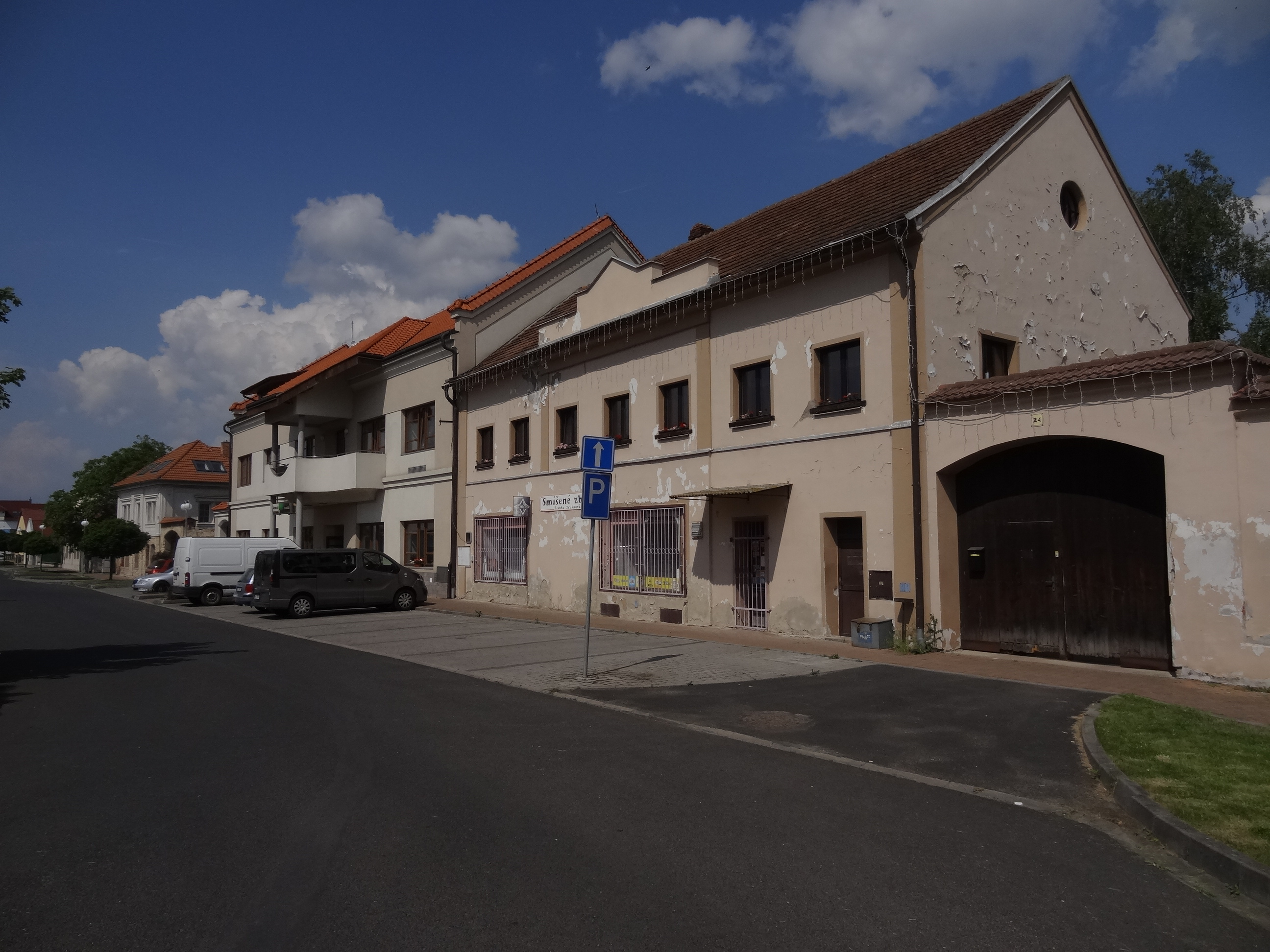
- Míru Square

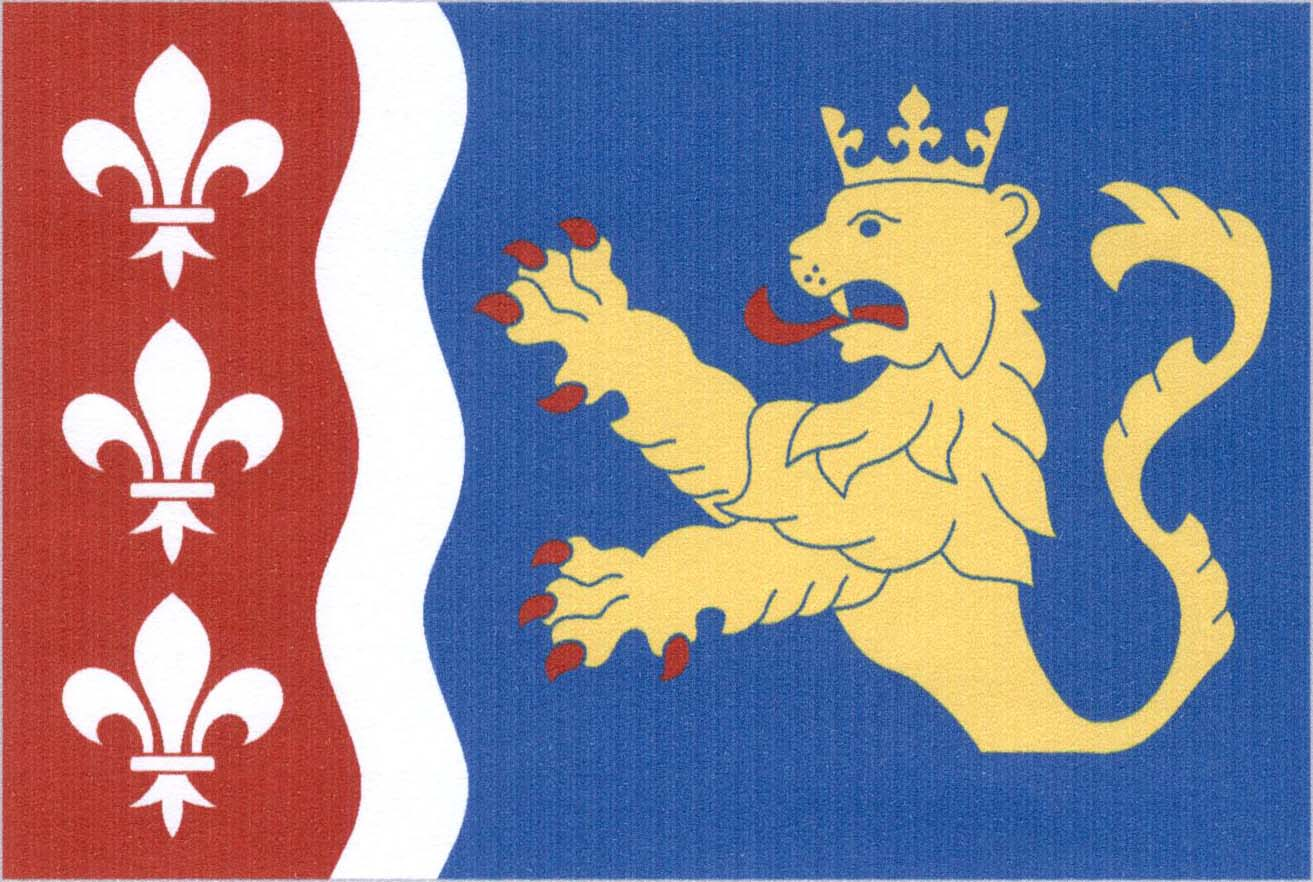
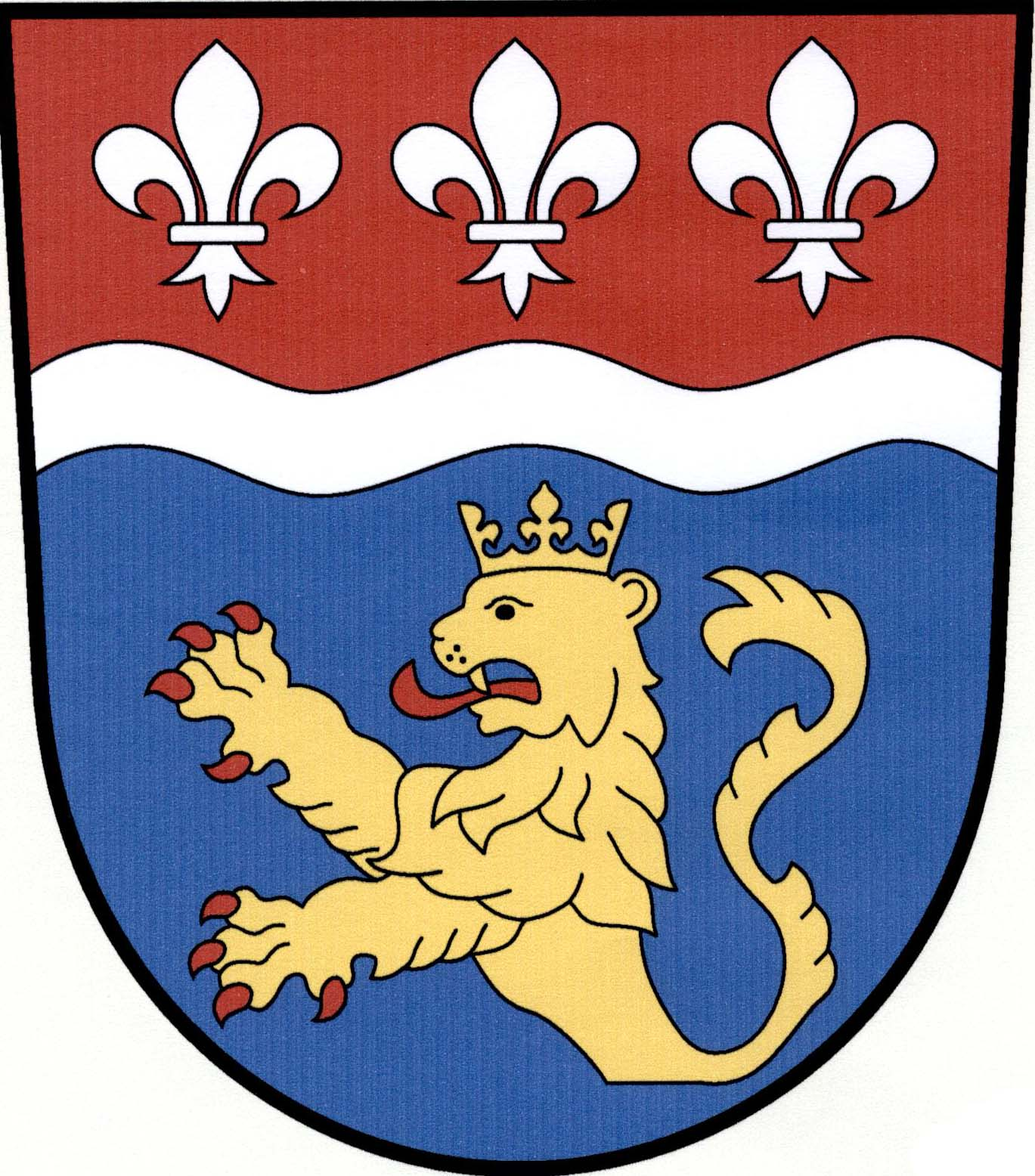
- Flag Coat of arms

- Location in the Czech Republic
- Coordinates: 50°23′36″N 14°27′1″E
- Country: Czech Republic
- Region: Central Bohemian
- District: Mělník
- First mentioned: 1318

Area
  - Total: 12.48 km^{2} (4.82 sq mi)
- Elevation: 158 m (518 ft)

Population (2026-01-01)
  - Total: 1,580
  - Density: 127/km^{2} (328/sq mi)
- Time zone: UTC+1 (CET)
  - Summer (DST): UTC+2 (CEST)
- Postal code: 277 01
- Website: www.dolniberkovice.cz

Dolní Beřkovice (German: Unter Berschkowitz) is a municipality and village in Mělník District in the Central Bohemian Region of the Czech Republic. It has about 1,600 inhabitants.

== Administrative division ==
Dolní Beřkovice consists of three municipal parts (in brackets population according to the 2021 census):

- Dolní Beřkovice (1,099)
- Podvlčí (55)
- Vliněves (351)

== Etymology ==
The name Beřkovice was probably derived from the surname Beřek, meaning "the village of Beřek's people". The prefix dolní means 'lower' and distinguish the village from nearby Horní Beřkovice ('upper Beřkovice'). The prefix began to appear only in the 18th century, after the original name Horní Beřkovice, Běškovice, was distorted into the current form.

== Geography ==
Dolní Beřkovice is located about 3 kilometres (2 mi) north of Mělník and 30 km (19 mi) north of Prague. It lies on the border between the Lower Ohře Table and Central Elbe Table. The municipality is situated on the left bank of the Elbe River.

== History ==
The first written mention of Dolní Beřkovice is from 1318. Between 1452 and 1597, the village was property of the Lords of Šebířov. The Knights of Blevice and Nosovice owned the village from 1597, but their properties were confiscated after the Battle of White Mountain. Polyxena of Lobkowicz acquired Dolní Beřkovice in 1622 and until the establishment of an independent municipality, the estate was continuously owned by the Lobkowicz family.

== Demographics ==
Historical population

Year	Pop.	±%
1869	1,368	—
1880	1,550	+13.3%
1890	1,660	+7.1%
1900	1,687	+1.6%
1910	1,711	+1.4%

Year	Pop.	±%
1921	1,703	−0.5%
1930	1,687	−0.9%
1950	1,503	−10.9%
1961	1,580	+5.1%
1970	1,573	−0.4%

Year	Pop.	±%
1980	1,465	−6.9%
1991	1,201	−18.0%
2001	1,308	+8.9%
2011	1,449	+10.8%
2021	1,505	+3.9%

Source: Censuses

== Transport ==
Dolní Beřkovice is located on the railway line Prague–Ústí nad Labem.

== Sights ==
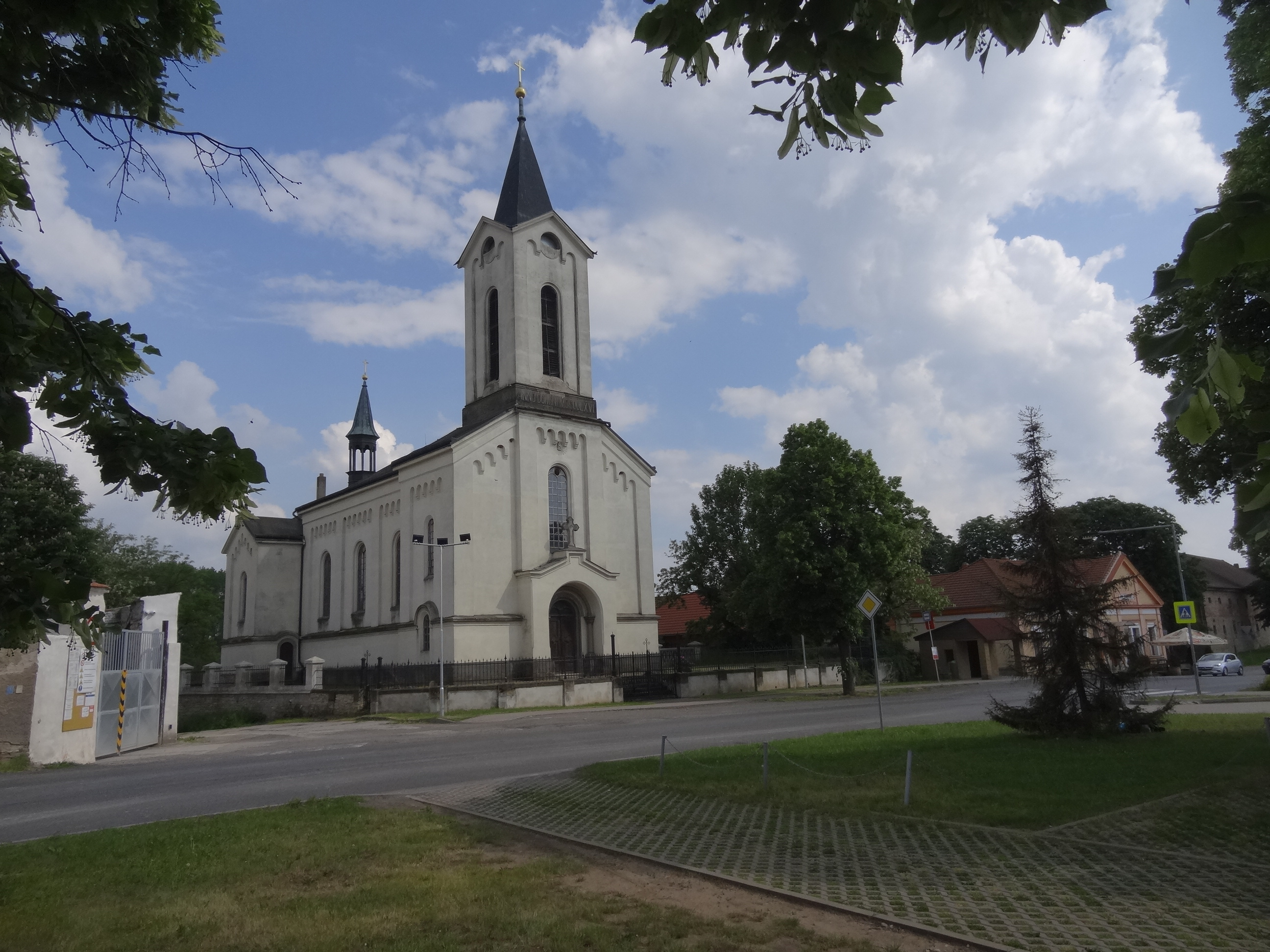
Church of the Beheading of Saint John the Baptist in Vliněves

The main landmark is the Dolní Beřkovice Castle. It was originally a fortress, rebuilt into a Renaissance castle in 1606. In 1853, it was rebuilt in the Neo-Renaissance style. Today the castle is owned by the Thurn und Taxis family.

The Church of the Beheading of Saint John the Baptist is located in Vliněves. It is a neo-Romanesque church, built in 1864–1866 on the site of an old Romanesque church.
