= Phillip Hyacinth von Lobkowicz =

Austrian prince and patron of music (1680–1734)

- Prince of Lobkowicz
- Born: 25 May 1680; Neustadt an der Waldnaab, Bavaria
- Died: 21 December 1734 (aged 54); Vienna
- Spouse: Countess Eleonore Karoline von Lobkowitz-Bílina (m. 1703; died 1720) Countess Maria Wilhelmine von Althann (m. 1721; died 1734)
- House: Lobkowicz
- Father: Ferdinand August von Lobkowicz
- Mother: Claudia Franziska von Nassau-Hadamar

Phillip Hyacinth von Lobkowicz (25 May 1680 – 21 December 1734) was the 4th Prince of Lobkowicz, Duke of Sagan, owner of the Princely county of Störnstein and other possessions in the Upper Palatinate, in Silesia and in Bohemia.

== Early life ==
Lobkowicz was born on 25 May 1680 in Neustadt an der Waldnaab in Bavaria. He was the eldest son of Ferdinand August von Lobkowicz (in turn eldest son of Václav Eusebius František of Lobkowicz) and, his first wife, Claudia Franziska von Nassau-Hadamar (1660–1680), a daughter of Maurice Henry, Prince of Nassau-Hadamar and Ernestine Charlotte von Nassau-Siegen (the daughter of Count John VIII of Nassau-Siegen).

== Career ==
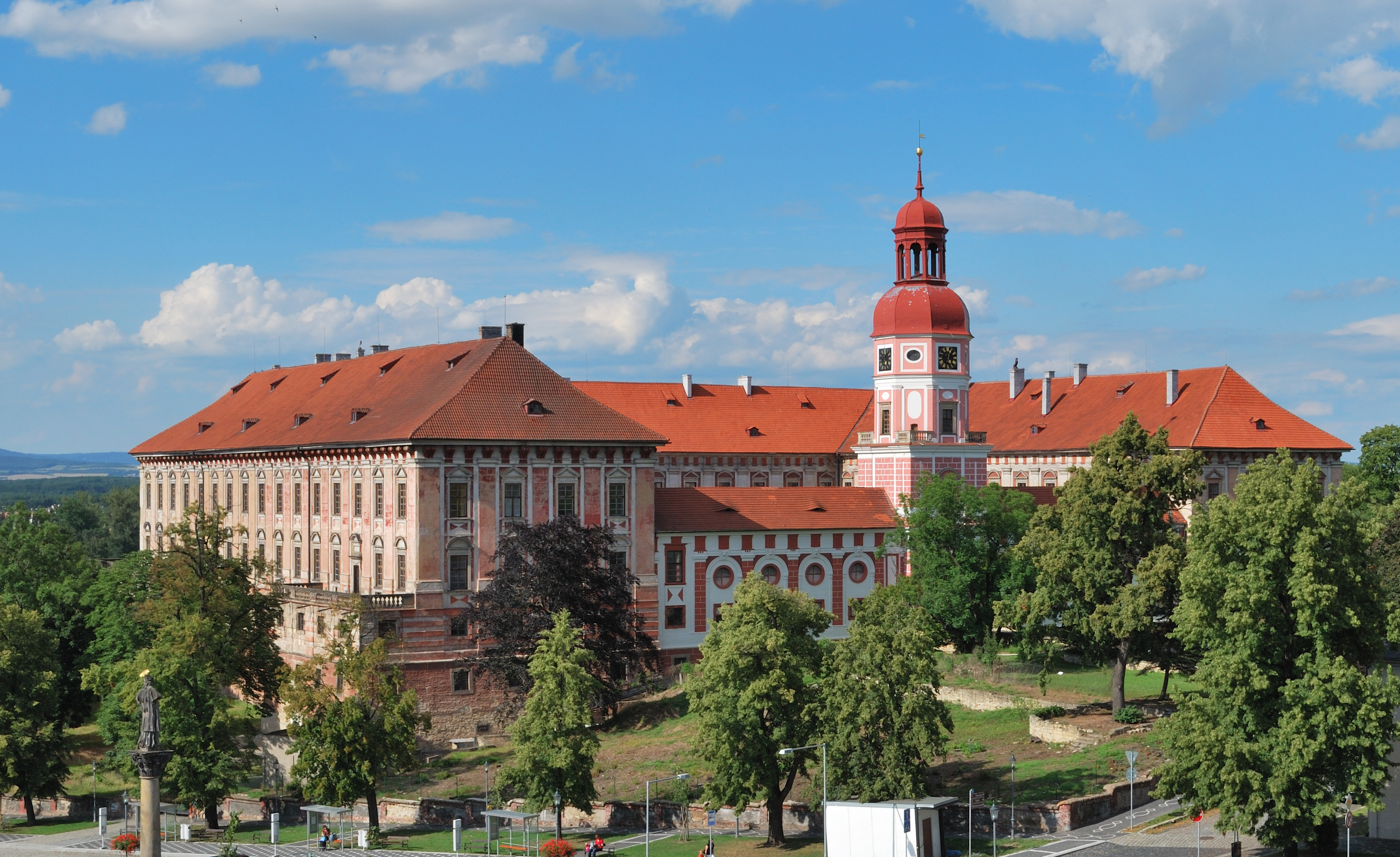
Roudnice nad Labem Castle

Through his first marriage to Countess Eleonore, the heiress of the House of Lobkowicz-Bílina, the properties of Bílina, Jezeří and others went to him and he founded the Roudnice branch of the older line of Popel of Lobkowicz. In 1707 the princely family left Neustadt an der Waldnaab and stayed in Vienna (then a part of the Archduchy of Austria) and their Bohemian possessions.

=== Musical patronage ===
Like his father, he was a friend and supporter of lute music and an active lutenist, composing several works for the lute. He also contributed important works to the Roudnice Lobkowicz Library.

One of his friends at the Viennese court was the lutenist Silvius Leopold Weiss. Christoph Willibald Gluck's father was a forester in the service of Phillip Hyacinth in Jezeří. During his time in Vienna, Phillip Hyacinth supported Gluck from 1729 onwards. With Phillip Hyacinth's stepbrother, Georg Christian of Lobkowicz, he travelled through Europe, which took him to London. Gluck dedicated operas La Sofonisba (1744), Ipermestra (1745) and a pasticcio (1743) to him. Phillip Hyacinth founded what was then an important band for the Loreta monastery in Prague.

== Personal life ==
On 17 October 1703, Lobkowicz married Countess Eleonore Karoline von Lobkowicz auf Bílina (1684–1720), a daughter of Wenzel Ferdinand Popel von Lobkowitz (the Habsburg Envoy to France). Before her death on 3 March 1720, the couple had one son:

- Ferdinand von Lobkowicz (d. 1704), who died young.

After the death of his first wife, he married Countess Maria Wilhelmine von Althann (1704–1757) on 25 August 1721. She was a cousin of Count Gundaker Ludwig von Althann. Together, they were the parents of:

- Wenzel Ferdinand, 5th Prince of Lobkowicz (1723–1739), who died unmarried.
- Ferdinand Philipp Joseph, 6th Prince of Lobkowicz (1724–1784), who married Princess Maria Gabriella di Savoia-Carignano, a daughter of Louis Victor, Prince of Carignano and Princess Christine of Hesse-Rotenburg (daughter of Ernst II Leopold, Landgrave of Hesse-Rotenburg), in 1769.
- Marie Anne von Lobkowicz (1725–1729), who died young.
- Anne Maria Elisabeth von Lobkowicz (1726–1786), who married diplomat Count Anton Corfiz von Ulfeldt, in 1743.
- Philip Joseph von Lobkowicz (1728–1729), who died young.
- Charles Joseph von Lobkowicz (1732–1734), who died young.

The Prince of Lobkowicz died on 21 December 1734 in Vienna and was succeeded by his eldest surviving son, Wenzel Ferdinand. He died, unmarried, in 1739 and the title passed to his younger brother, Ferdinand.

=== Descendants ===
Through his son Ferdinand, he was a grandfather of Joseph Franz, 7th Prince of Lobkowitz, who married Maria Karolina von Schwarzenberg (daughter of Johann I, Prince of Schwarzenberg and Countess Maria Eleonore zu Oettingen-Wallerstein, a daughter of Count Philipp Karl von Oettingen-Wallerstein). They had twelve children.

Through his daughter Anne Maria, he was a grandfather of Elisabeth Ulfeldt (wife of Count Georg Christian von Waldstein-Wartenberg; ancestors of several European monarchs through Princess Maria Antonia Koháry), and Maria Ulfeldt (wife of Count Josef von Thun und Hohenstein; known for her patronage of Mozart and Beethoven).
