= Ferdinand Philipp von Lobkowicz =

Austrian prince and patron of music (1724–1784)

Phillip Hyacinth von Lobkowicz
- Prince of Lobkowicz
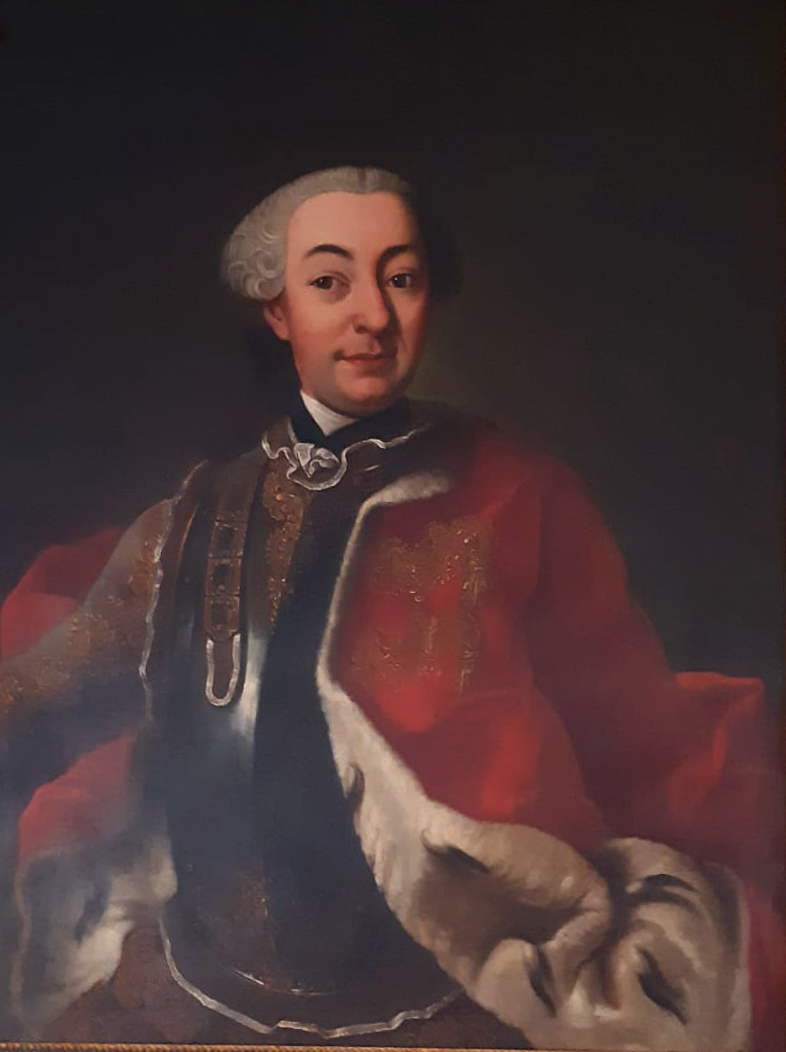
- Portrait of Prince Lobkowicz by Martin van Meytens
- Born: 27 April 1724; Prague, Bohemia
- Died: 11 January 1784 (aged 59); Vienna, Archduchy of Austria, Holy Roman Empire
- Spouse: Princess Maria Gabriella di Savoia-Carignano (m. 1769; died 1784)
- Issue: Joseph Franz von Lobkowitz
- House: Lobkowicz
- Father: Phillip Hyacinth von Lobkowicz
- Mother: Maria Wilhelmine von Althann

Ferdinand Philipp von Lobkowicz (27 April 1724 – 11 January 1784) was a Bohemian nobleman, patron of the arts and musician. A member of the Lobkowicz family, he was the 6th Prince of Lobkowicz.

== Early life ==
Lobkowicz was born on 27 April 1724 in Prague. He was the second son of Prince Phillip Hyacinth von Lobkowicz (1680–1734) and, his second wife, Countess Maria Wilhelmine von Althann (1704–1757), a cousin of Count Gundaker Ludwig von Althann. His younger sister, Anne Maria Elisabeth von Lobkowicz, married the diplomat Count Anton Corfiz von Ulfeldt.

His paternal grandparents were Ferdinand August von Lobkowicz and, his first wife, Claudia Franziska von Nassau-Hadamar (a daughter of Maurice Henry, Prince of Nassau-Hadamar and Ernestine Charlotte von Nassau-Siegen, herself the daughter of Count John VIII of Nassau-Siegen).

== Career ==
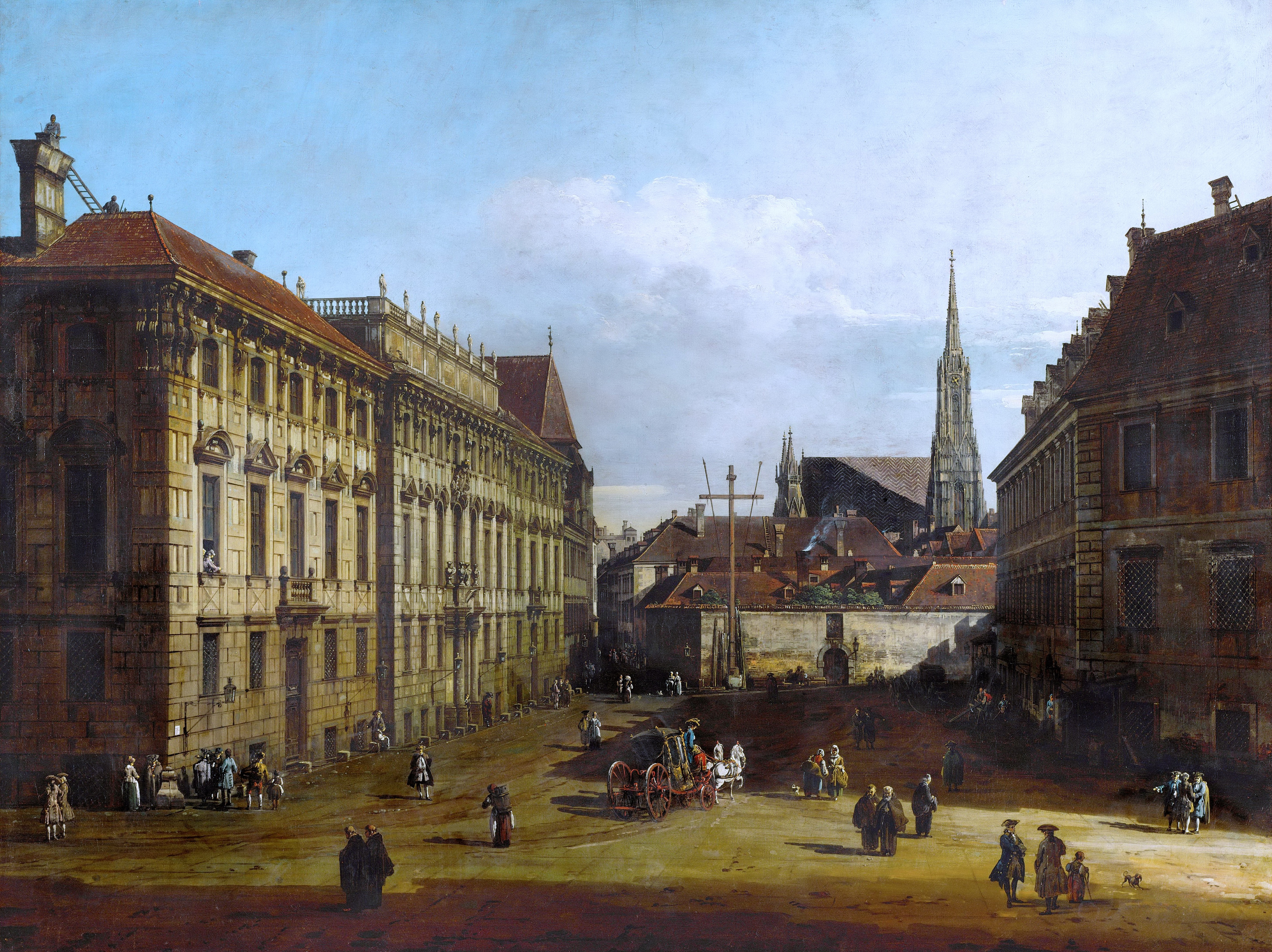
Palais Lobkowitz (on the left) in Vienna; painting by Canaletto, about 1760

Upon his father's death in 1737, his elder brother, Wenzel Ferdinand, succeeded as the 5th Prince of Lobkowitz. When his brother died, unmarried, two years later in 1739, the title passed to young Ferdinand.

When the First Silesian War began in 1740, and the Prussians conquered Silesia, and with it the Duchy of Sagan, which was valuable to Lobkowitz, he supported the Prussians and Frederick the Great, which was likely a reason why, unlike his relatives, he never received the Order of the Golden Fleece. In January 1750, he officially received Sagan as a fief from the Prussian king.

From 1743 onwards, the now ruling prince was able to devote himself entirely to his extensive studies with a focus on music in Vienna, building on his father's work with the orchestra. Ferdinand, who was considered one of the best amateur violinists, was taught by Christoph Willibald Gluck and Franz Benda in Berlin. In 1745, he took Gluck on a trip to Italy and England. In 1746, he travelled to London again to buy breeding horses. There he saw paintings by Canaletto, some of which he bought and brought back to Bohemia.

=== Life in Prague ===
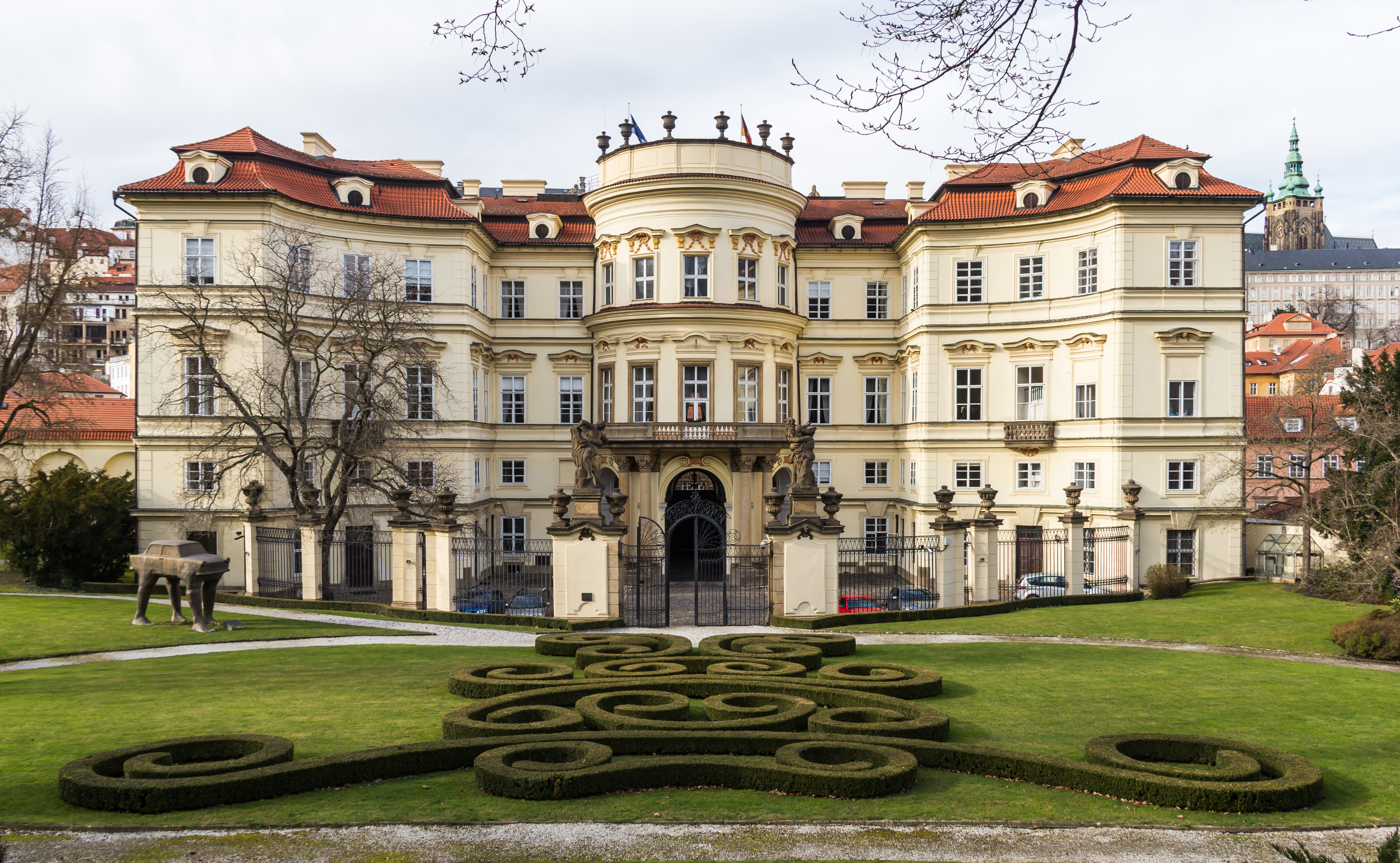
Palais Lobkowicz, Prague

In 1753, he acquired the Palais Lobkowicz on Vlašská street in Prague, on the outskirts of the old city. After acquiring the palace, Lobkowicz moved out of the older Lobkowicz Palace in Hradčany. In 1927, his family sold the Vlašská Palace to the Czechoslovak state which used it as the Ministry of Education. It was sold in 1948 and used as the Chinese embassy, before being acquired by the Federal Republic of Germany in 1974, who use it as their embassy to this day.

== Personal life ==
On 10 July 1769, he married Princess Maria Gabriella di Savoia-Carignano (1748–1828), a daughter of Louis Victor, Prince of Carignano and Princess Christine of Hesse-Rotenburg (daughter of Ernst II Leopold, Landgrave of Hesse-Rotenburg), in 1769.

- Joseph Franz, 7th Prince of Lobkowitz (1772–1816), who married Maria Karolina von Schwarzenberg, a daughter of Johann I, Prince of Schwarzenberg and Countess Maria Eleonore zu Oettingen-Wallerstein (a daughter of Count Philipp Karl von Oettingen-Wallerstein).

The Prince of Lobkowicz died on 21 December 1734 in Vienna and was succeeded by his only son, Joseph Franz.
