= Franz Schrotzberg =

Austrian painter (1811–1889)

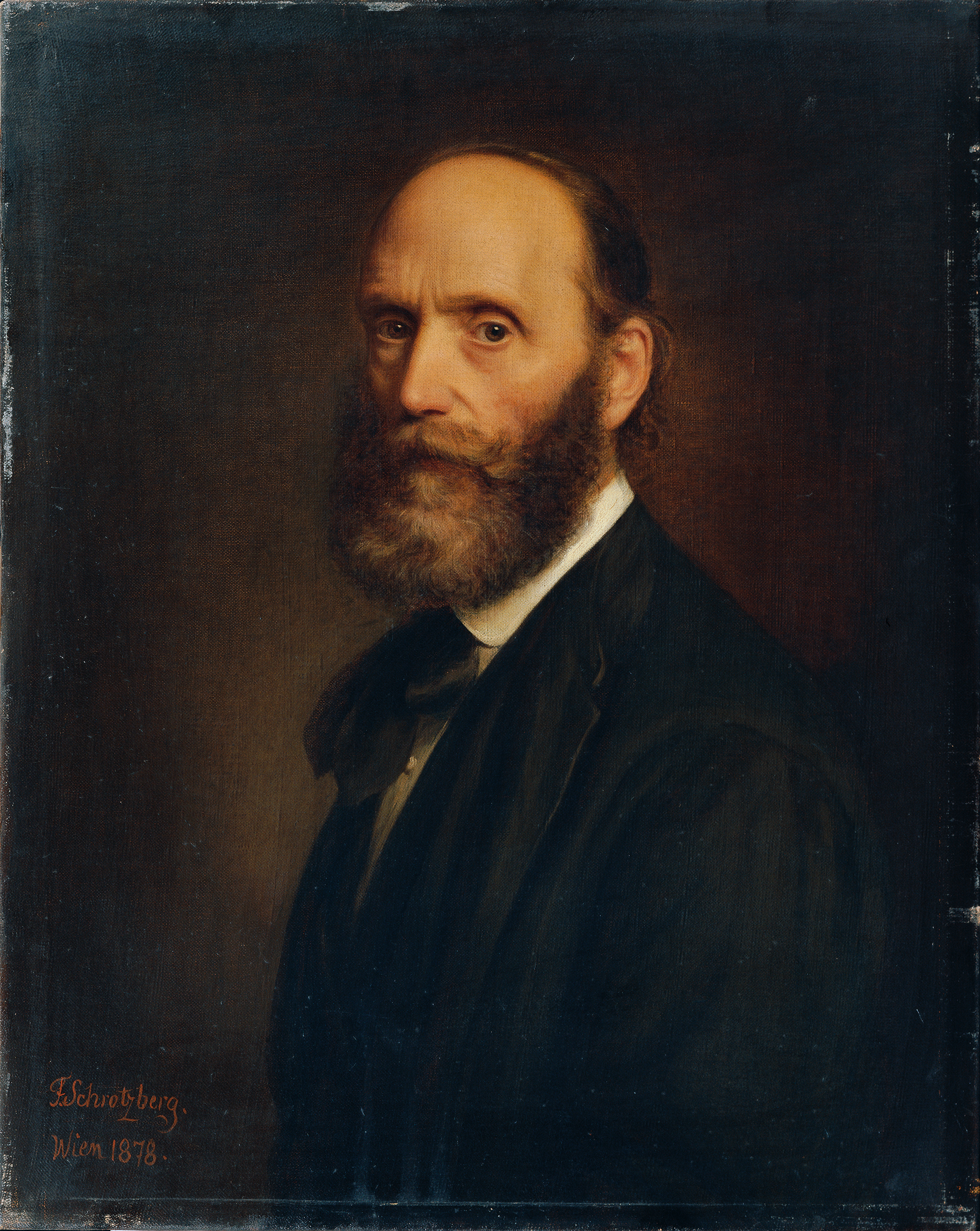
Self-portrait (1878)

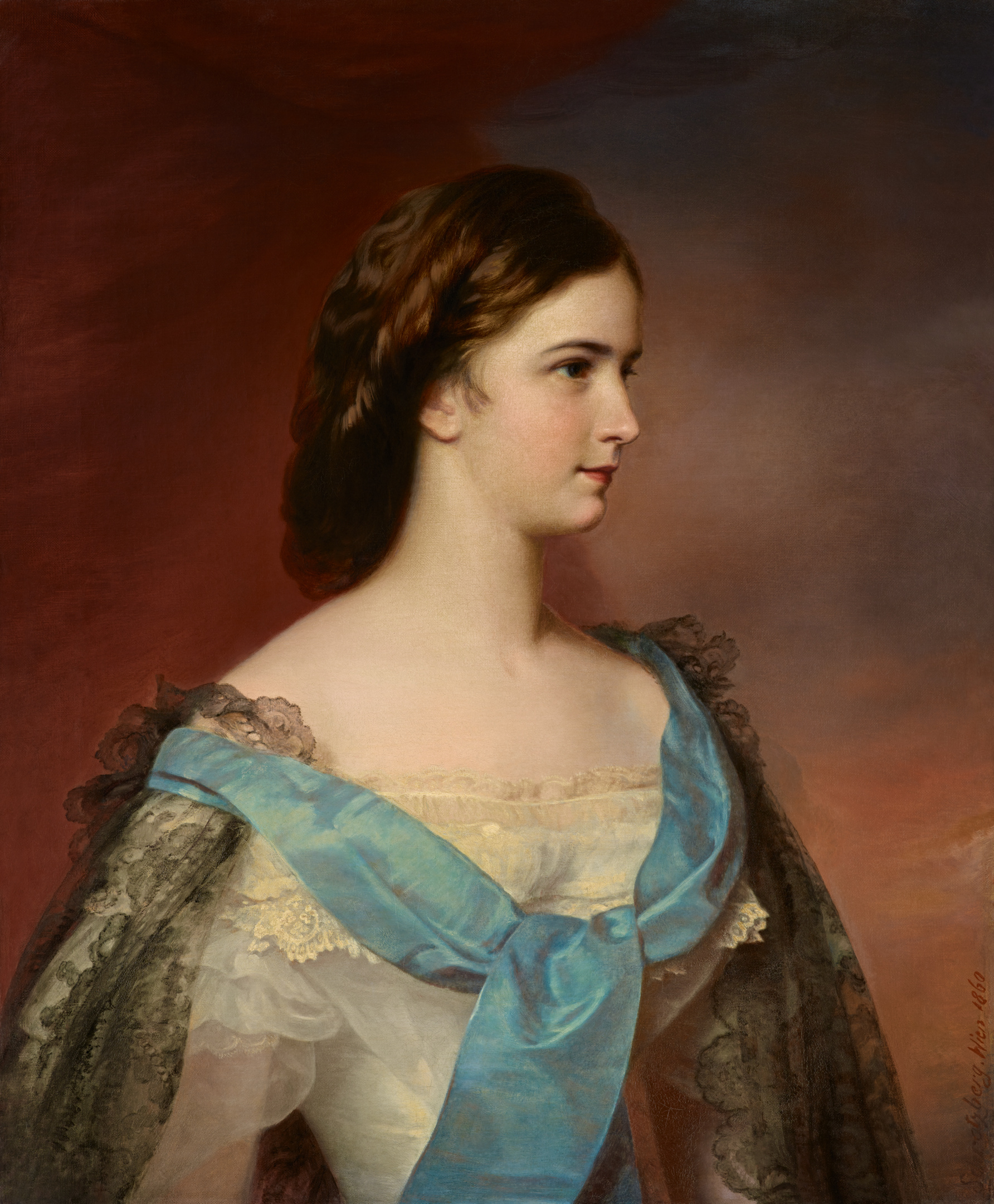
Portrait of Empress Elisabeth

Franz Schrotzberg (2 April 1811, Vienna – 29 May 1889, Graz) was an Austrian portrait painter.

== Life and work ==
From 1825 to 1831, he was a student at the Academy of Fine Arts. During his time there, he was awarded three prizes and given a scholarship. At the age of nineteen, he became friends with the landscape painter Karl Marko, who had a significant influence on his artistic approach, although he would eventually turn to portrait painting.

In 1832, he first exhibited some portraits and mythological scenes. Five years later, he made an extended study trip to Italy, then, in 1842, to Belgium. He became a member of the Academy the following year. He also visited London and Paris. By the 1850s, he was one of the most sought-after painters of female portraits in Vienna.

His opulent style proved to be controversial among his contemporaries, however. In 1903 the art critic Ludwig Hevesi wrote that he was "silky smooth" (seidenglatte), as well as a mild (gelinder) Viennese version of Franz Xaver Winterhalter, and had the luck to make his career by painting a youthful Empress Elisabeth.

In addition to painting, he taught at the Academy, where his students included the portrait painter Ernst Lafite, later said to be his "successor". His paintings of the Habsburgs and other members of the nobility were often reproduced as lithographs by Josef Kriehuber, August Prinzhofer, Adolf Dauthage and Franz Eybl, among others. In 1867, he was awarded the Order of Franz Joseph. A street in Vienna's Leopoldstadt district was named after him in 1899.

He was married to Eleonore Stohl. Their daughter, Helene, married the progressive educator Ludwig Gurlitt in 1890.

== Gallery ==
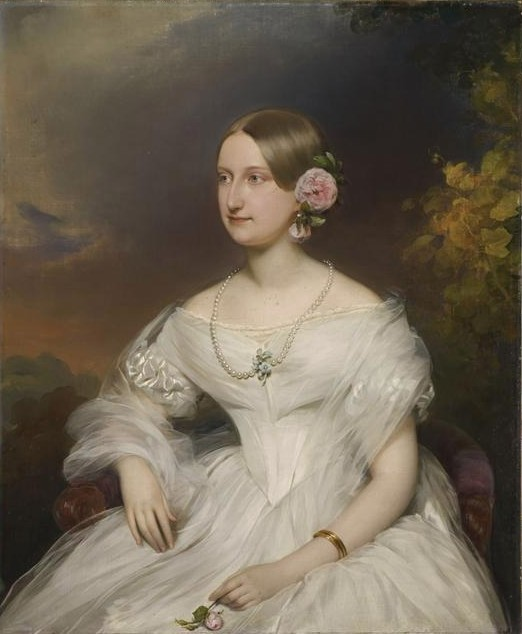
Princess Maria Carolina, Duchess of Aumale (1822–1869), wife of Henri d'Orléans, Duke of Aumale (1822-1897), at 20 years old, 1842

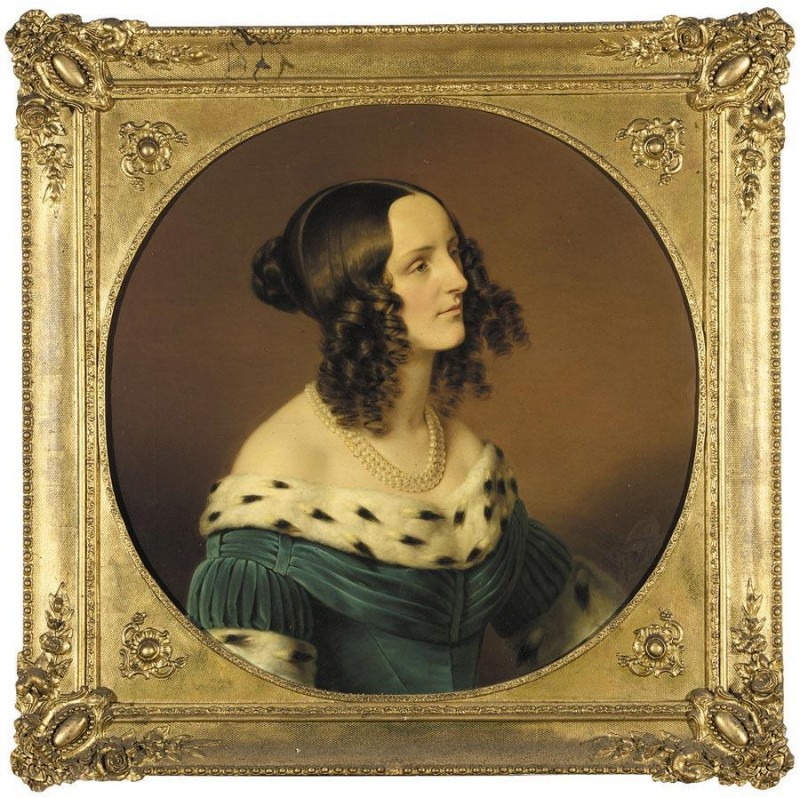
Auguste of Solms-Braunfels, Princess of Schwarzburg

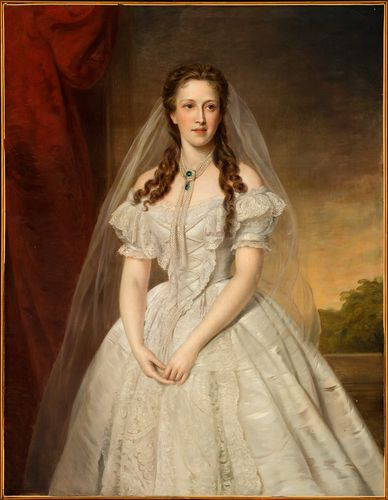
Baroness Leontina von Wenckheim in court dress, 1866

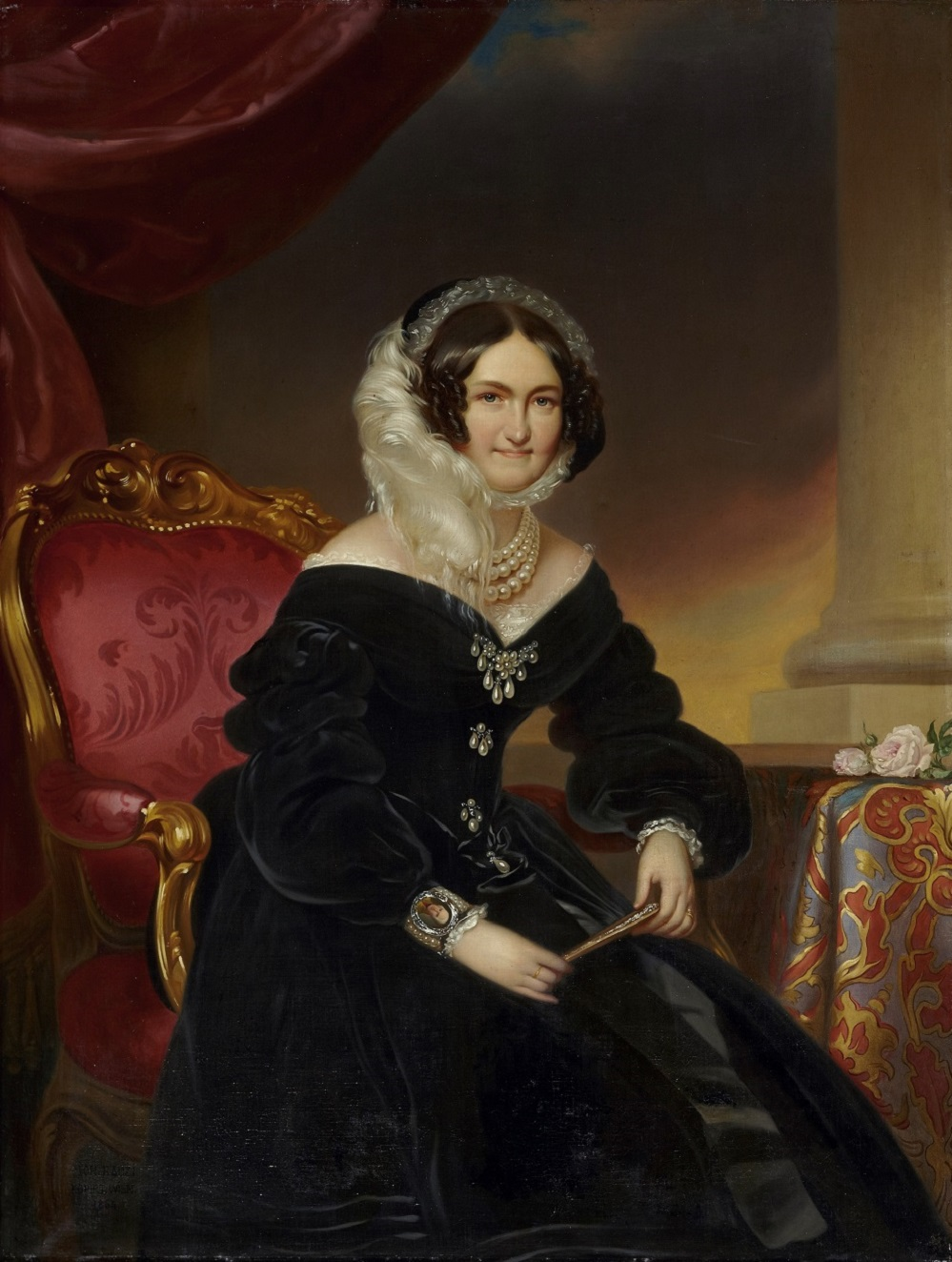
Caroline Augusta of Bavaria, empress of Austria, 1846

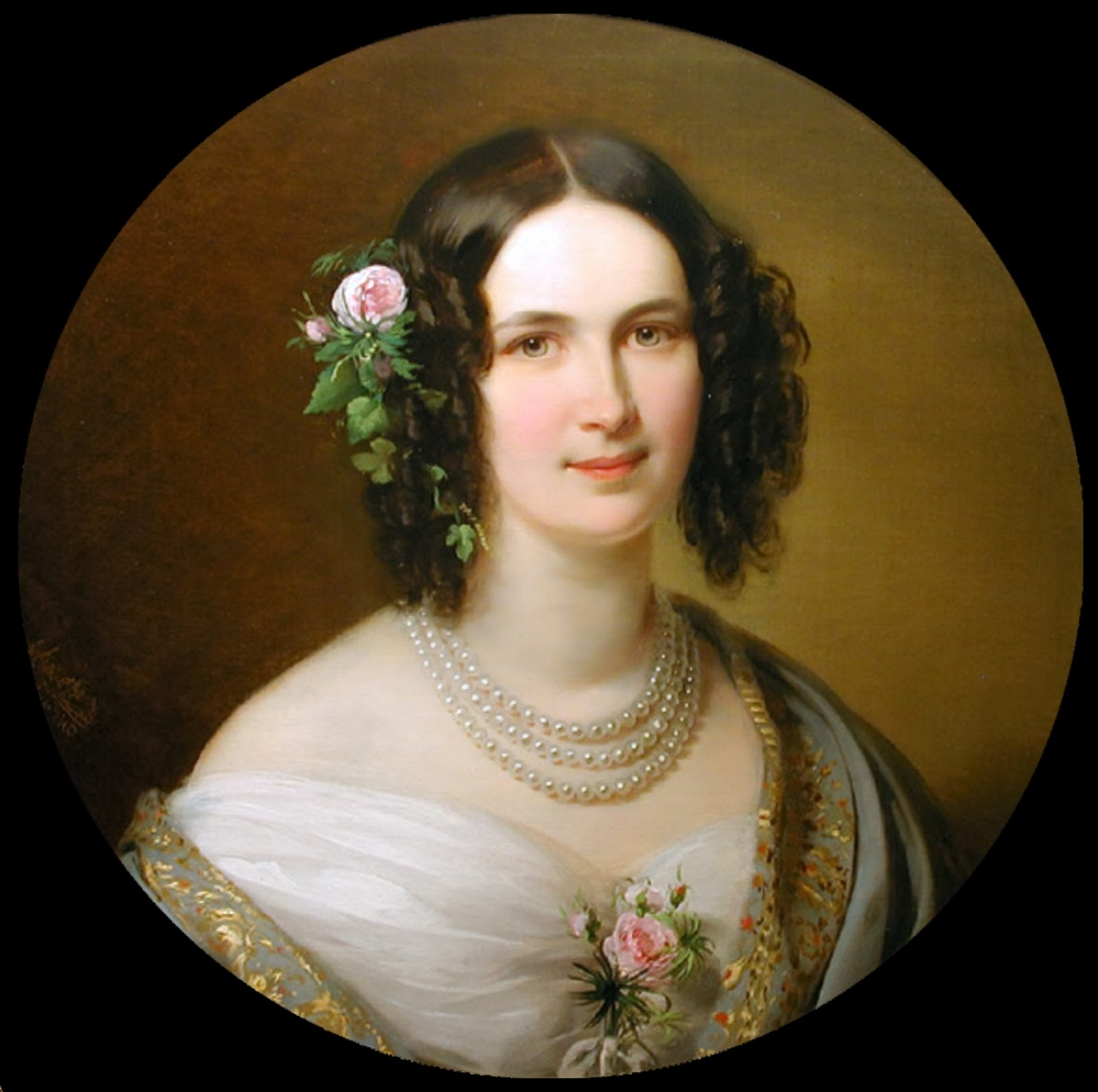
Marie Countess Kinsky (b.1809), 1840

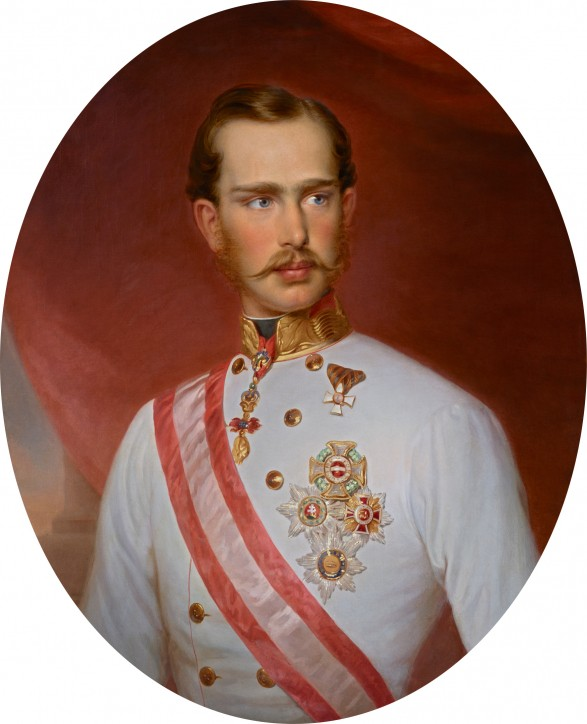
Portrait of Emperor Franz Joseph I of Austria, 1860

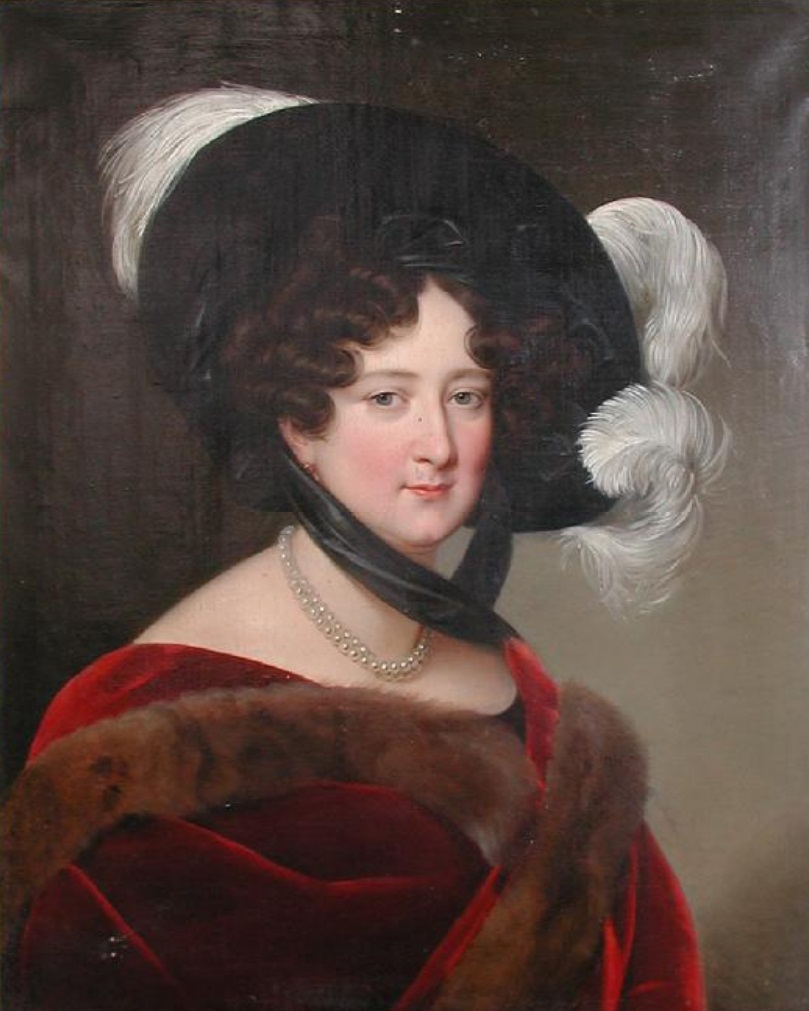
Princess Marie Gabriela of Lobkowicz (1793 - 1863), the eldest of thirteen children of the seventh reigning Prince of Lobkowicz, 1843

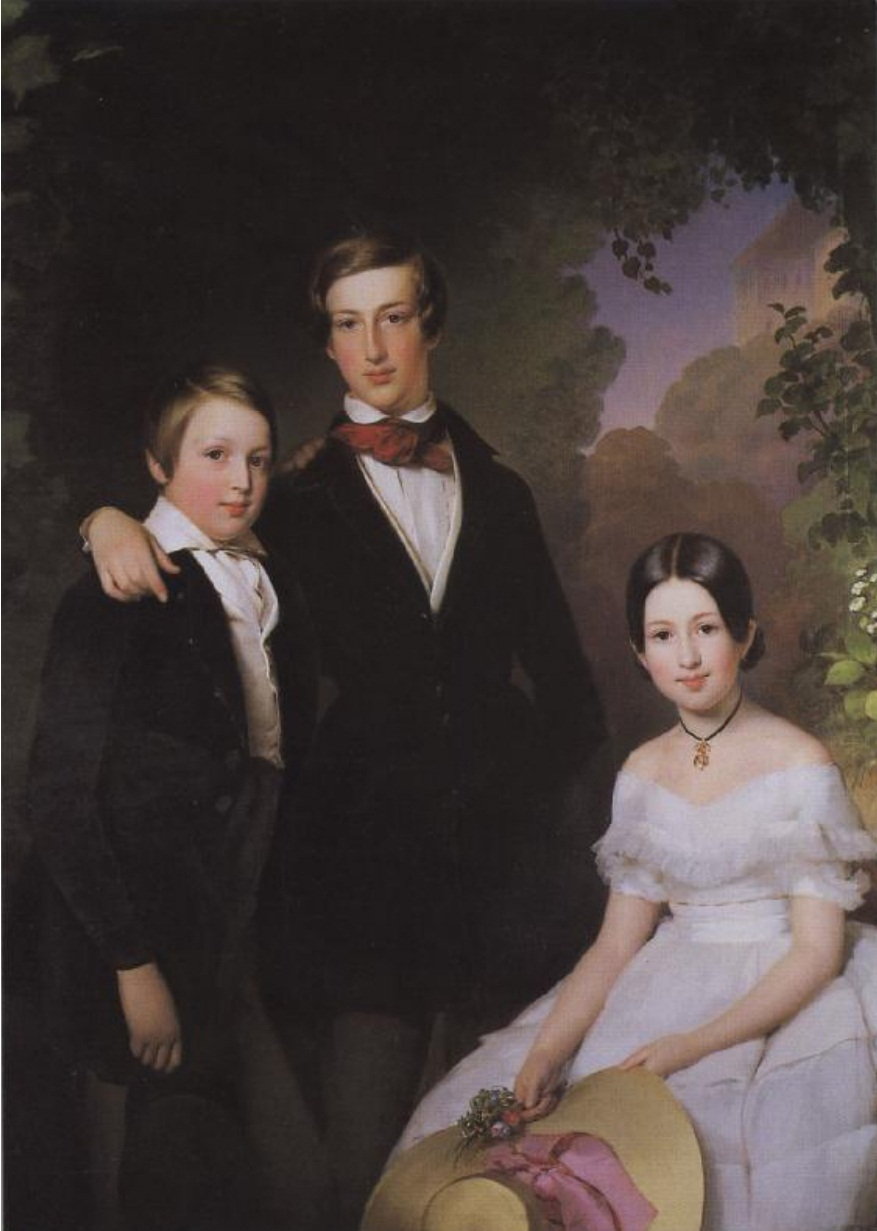
Maximilián Marie (1827 – 1849, left) was originally supposed to succeed his father, the 8th ruling prince of the House of Lobkowicz, but after his untimely death, his younger brother Mořic Alois (1831 – 1903, centre) took over this task. On the right is their sister, Princess Leopoldina Luisa (1835 - 1892), 1844
