= Li Chuan Yun =

Chinese violinist

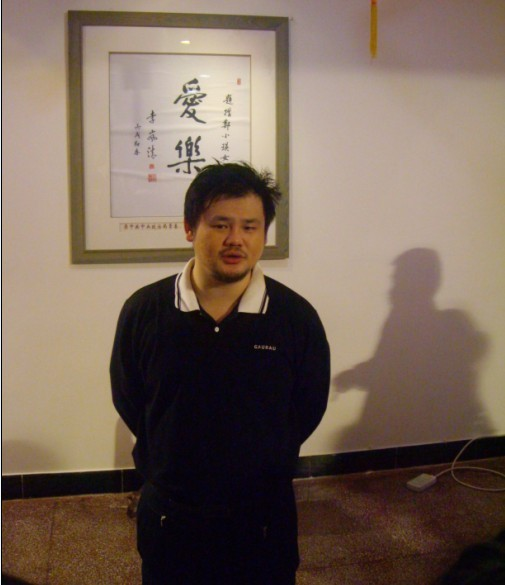
Li Chuan Yun

Li Chuan Yun (李傳韻; born 1980), also known as Chuanyun Li or Babeli, is a Chinese violinist.

== Early life ==
Born to a musical family in the coastal city of Qingdao in Northern China, Li's parents began to teach him the violin from home at age three.

Li won his first championship at the Beijing Youth and Junior Violin Competition when he was five years old. At the age of eleven, he became the youngest winner in the Fifth Wieniawski International Youth Violin Competition, receiving the first place.

== Education ==
Li studied at the Central Conservatory of Music in Beijing for ten years before beginning studies at the Juilliard School in 1996. At Juilliard, Li studied with Dorothy DeLay, Itzhak Perlman and Hyo Kang; he later continued his studies with Delay and Kurt Sassmannshaus at the University of Cincinnati Conservatory of Music.

== Instruments ==
In the past, Li has performed on a 1784 Guadagnini on extended loan from the Stradivari Society. He has also performed with the following violins from the Stradivari Society in recording Stradivari Campaign.

- "Lobkowicz" Amati of 1617 ($1,000,000)
- "Ruby" Stradivarius of 1708 ($5,000,000)
- "La Cathedral" Stradivarius of 1707 ($5,000,000)
- "Sloane" Guarneri of 1742 ($4,000,000)
- "Lenora Jackson" Stradivarius of 1714 ($5,000,000)
- "Mantua-Ricci" Balestreri of 1771 ($4,500,000)
- Osborn 1766

== Discography ==
- Paganini 24 Caprices (4-CD set, 1993 Hong Kong recordings and 2007 Beijing recordings), ISBN 9787798606461
- Violin Operas
- Romantic Moments, ISBN 9787798994612
- Love Capriccio, ISBN 9787884815579
- Prophetic Birds
- Stradivari Campaign, ISBN 9787883192817
- The Rebirth of Great Violin
- La Ronde des Lutins (POLOARTS, 2005), ISBN 9787799915920
- Salut D'Amour, Strauss Violin Sonata, and Favourite Encores (Hänssler Classics, 2004) ISBN 9787880713459

== Films ==
Li Chuan Yun performed in the movie Together in 2002. Li performed and recorded the soundtrack's solo violin music.

In 2004, Li appeared in a documentary series about outstanding young Chinese musicians from Radio Television Hong Kong.

== Awards ==
- At age 5, he won his first championship at the Beijing Youth and Junior Violin Competition.
- In 1991, at age 11, he was awarded first place at the Fifth Wieniawski International Youth Violin Competition by the unanimous vote of 20 judges from 11 countries; he is the youngest winner in the competition's history.
- In 1998, at age 17, he won the first prize in the Nakamichi Violin Concerto competition.
- At age 19, he won first prize in the Saint Saens Violin Concerto competition.
- In 2008, he won the China Gold Record award.
- In 2009, he won the Best Artist Award from the Hong Kong Arts Development Council.
