= Lobkowicz family =

Czech noble family

House of Lobkowicz Lobkovicové
- Uradel
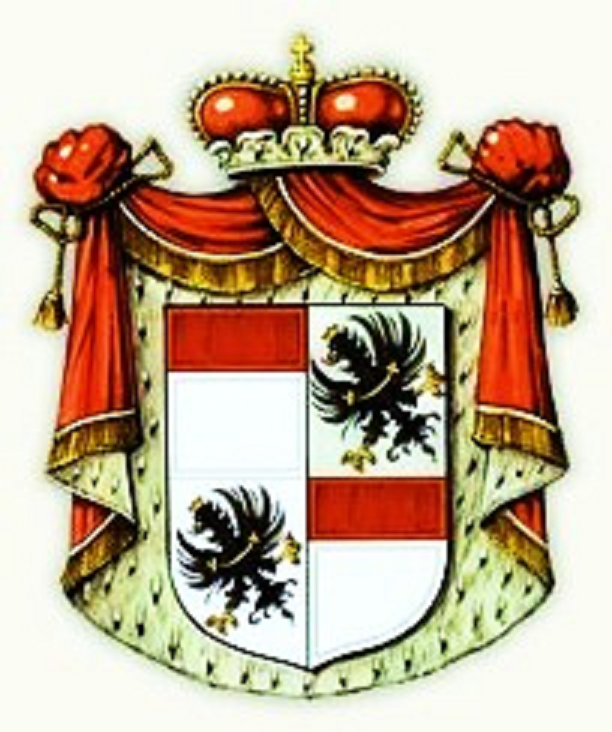
- Country: Kingdom of Bohemia (origin)
- Founded: 14th century
- Founder: Mikuláš chudý z Újezda
- Current head: William Lobkowicz
- Titles: Prince of the Holy Roman Empire; Duke of Sagan; Prince of Lobkowicz; Count of Sternstein
- Cadet branches: Hasištejnský z Lobkovic; Popel z Lobkovic

The House of Lobkowicz (Lobkovicové in modern Czech, sg. z Lobkovic; Lobkowitz in German) is an important Bohemian noble family that dates back to the 14th century and is one of the oldest noble families of the region. Over the centuries, the family expanded their possessions through marriage with the most powerful families of the region, which resulted in gaining vast territories all across central Europe. Due to that, and despite the Czech roots, the family was also incorporated into the German, Austrian and Belgian nobility.

== History ==
The first Lobkowiczs were members of the gentry of north-eastern Bohemia in the late 14th century. On 3 August 1459 they were granted the title of Freiherr. In the 17th century, members of the family were awarded with the title of Prince, which was granted to them on 17 October 1623 by Ferdinand II, Holy Roman Emperor. In 1786, Emperor Joseph II further ennobled the 7th Prince when he created him Duke of Roudnice (Herzog von Raudnitz in German, vévoda roudnický in Czech).

The family's Imperial immediacy over Princely county of Störnstein was mediatized to Bavaria in 1807. As such, the House of Lobkowicz belong to the small group of families that constitute the Hochadel (German for 'high nobility') and is one of the mediatised houses.

== Princes of Lobkowicz ==
- Zdenko Adalbert, 1st Prince 1624–1628 (1568–1628)
  - Wenzel Eusebius, 2nd Prince 1628–1677 (1609–1677)
    - Ferdinand August, 3rd Prince 1677–1715 (1655–1715)
      - Phillip Hyacinth, 4th Prince 1715–1737 (1680–1737)
        - Wenzel Ferdinand, 5th Prince 1737–1739 (1723–1739)
        - Ferdinand, 6th Prince 1739–1784 (1724–1784)
          - Joseph Franz Maximilian, 7th Prince 1784–1816 (1772–1816)
            - Ferdinand Joseph, 8th Prince 1816–1868 (1797–1868)
              - Moritz, 9th Prince 1868–1903 (1831–1903)
                - Ferdinand, 10th Prince 1903–1938 (1858–1938)
                  - Prince Ferdinand, renounced his succession rights 1920
            - Prince Johann of Lobkowicz (1799–1878)
              - Prince Franz Eugen of Lobkowicz (1839–1898)
                - Jaroslav, 11th Prince 1938–1953 (1877–1953)
                  - Friedrich, 12th Prince 1953–1954 (1907–1954)
                  - Jaroslav, 13th Prince 1953–1985 (1910–1985)
                    - Jaroslav, 14th Prince 1985–present (b. 1942)
                      - Vladimir, Hereditary Prince of Lobkowicz (b. 1972)
                        - Prince Jaroslav of Lobkowicz (b. 2012)
                      - Prince Jaroslav of Lobkowicz (b. 1974)
                      - Prince Philippe of Lobkowicz (b. 1981)
                        - Prince Casimir of Lobkowicz (b. 2009)
                        - Prince Rudolf of Lobkowicz (b. 2011)
            - Prince Joseph Franz of Lobkowicz (1803–1875)
              - Prince Georg Ferdinand of Lobkowicz (1862–1921)
                - Prince Edouard Josef of Lobkowicz (1899–1959)
                  - Prince Edouard of Lobkowicz (1926–2010)
                    - Prince Edouard-Xavier of Lobkowicz (1960–1984)
                    - Prince Robert of Lobkowicz (1961–1988)
                    - Prince Charles-Henri of Lobkowicz (b. 1964)

== Notable family members ==
- Mikuláš Chudý ("the Poor") z Újezda (c. 1378–1435) was a poor squire from the village of Újezd in Bohemia. After studying at the Charles University in Prague, he became a scribe in Kutná Hora. King Wenceslaus IV rewarded him for his services with the title to the village of Lobkovice (after which he began styling himself Nicholas of Lobkowicz), and he became the supreme scribe of the Bohemian kingdom in 1417. At the king's command, he captured several castles belonging to rebellious nobles; he was allowed to keep one, Hasištejn Castle, as a hereditary possession.
- Nicholas Hasištejnský z Lobkowicz (died 1462). The elder son of Nicholas of Lobkowicz, he inherited Hasištejn Castle. He and his brother Jan were raised to the status of free lords by Emperor Frederick III in 1459. Twenty years later, they were awarded Czech lordly status as well.
- Jan Popel z Lobkowicz (died 1470) was the younger son of Nicholas of Lobkowicz. He inherited Hluboká Castle and the village of Lobkovice from his father's estate. Along with his elder brother Nicholas, he was ennobled in 1459.
- Jan Hasištejnský z Lobkovic (1450–1517) was a diplomat who traveled on ambassadorial missions to Luxembourg in 1477 and Rome in 1487. King Vladislaus II entrusted him with negotiating his marriage to Mary of Burgundy, but the match ultimately never occurred. Much like his younger brother Bohuslav, the so-called “Czech Ulysses,” Jan journeyed to the Holy Land, later writing a book about his experiences (Pilgrimage to the Holy Grave in Jerusalem, 1505). He helped develop a Franciscan monastery in Kadaň, and is buried there.
- His brother Bohuslav Hasištejnský z Lobkovic (1461–1510) was a poet, essayist, and philosopher. He was well known for his prose, letters, and verses, including a satire on life in Bohemia. An extensive traveler who studied in Bologna and Ferrara and who voyaged to Egypt and the Holy Land, Bohuslav was elected Bishop of Olomouc but never held that office, as the pope refused to appoint him. He collected more than 650 books, primarily humanist and classical texts—an astonishing number for the era in which he lived. Roughly two thirds of his collection remains in the Lobkowicz Library, including more than 400 of the 750 incunabula belonging to the library.
- Krystof Popel the Younger of Lobkowicz (1549–1609) was the Chief Steward of Bohemia during the reign of Emperor Rudolf II. Kryštof was a close friend of Hans von Aachen, the celebrated court painter. Known for his diplomatic and linguistic skills, he was often tasked with welcoming foreign visitors—including Persians, Turks, and Russians—to the Emperor's court, and was responsible for peace negotiations with the Polish king Sigismund.
- Jiří Popel z Lobkowicz (c. 1551–1607 or 1613) was a devout Catholic nobleman who founded a Jesuit college in Chomutov and reestablished a monastery in Kadaň after it had been abolished due to connections with Lutheranism. Influential at the Imperial Court, in 1585 he became the Court Administrator, the second-highest office in Bohemia. However, he soon fell out of favor with Emperor Rudolf II, who blamed him and the other councillors for his brother Maximilian's defeat at the Battle of Byczyna and subsequent imprisonment. In 1593, he and his brother Ladislav Popel z Lobkowicz led an unsuccessful revolt against Rudolf II among the nobility. The two brothers fled Prague and were sentenced to death in absentia; Jiří was captured, but the Emperor lessened his sentence to life imprisonment and loss of property. He remained in prison for the rest of his life; the date of his death is unknown, but the years most frequently cited are 1607 and 1613.
- Vilém mladší Popel z Lobkovic (c. 1575–1647). On 15 June 1587, he inherited the lordship of Horšovský Týn, which his father, John the Younger, had purchased in 1546. He was a royal councillor, and a court justice from 1628 to 1634. Being a Protestant, he was dispossessed in favour of the Catholic Lobkowicz line after the Battle of White Mountain in 1620.

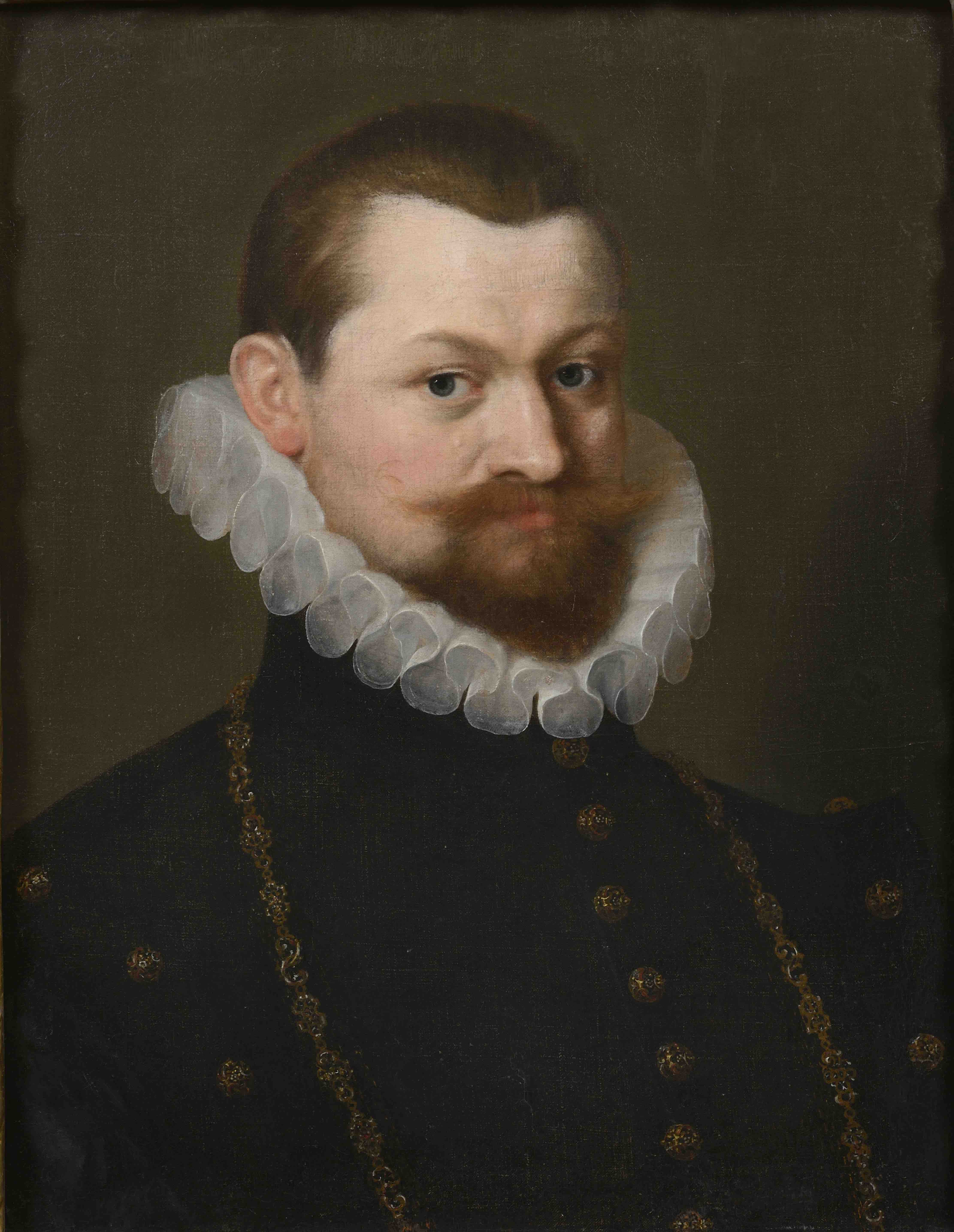
Zdeněk Vojtěch Popel z Lobkovic (1568–1628), 1st Prince Lobkowicz

- Zdeněk Vojtěch Popel z Lobkovic (1568–1628), 1st Prince Lobkowicz, was Chancellor to the Czech Kingdom under Emperors Rudolf II, Matthias, and Ferdinand II. Zdeněk Vojtěch was a major political figure in both Bohemia and the larger Habsburg empire. He and his wife Polyxena Pernštejn (1566–1642), the daughter of a Chancellor to the Czech Kingdom and an influential Spanish noblewoman, were leaders of the “Spanish” (i.e. Catholic) bloc at court, opposed to the Protestant factions. When the Emperor's Catholic ministers were hurled from the windows of Prague Castle in the famous Defenestration of Prague in 1618, they took refuge in the nearby Lobkowicz Palace. The incident also signalled a turning point in the fortunes of the Lobkowicz family: although their property was confiscated by rebellious Protestants in 1618, the Catholic victory at the Battle of White Mountain in 1620 resulted in the restoration of their property and ensured that the family, as Catholic nobles, would continue to be highly influential. That same year, King Philip III of Spain awarded Zdeněk Vojtěch the Order of the Golden Fleece, the highest order of European chivalry. In 1624, Ferdinand II granted him the title of Imperial Prince, and he became the first hereditary Prince Lobkowicz.
- Polyxena Pernštejn (1566–1642), 1st Princess Lobkowicz, was the daughter of Vratislav II of Pernštejn (1530–1582), Chancellor of the Czech Kingdom, and Maria Maximiliana Manrique de Lara y Mendoza (1538–1608), an influential Spanish noblewoman. In 1587, she became the fourth wife of William of Rosenberg (1535–1592), High Treasurer and High Burgrave of Bohemia and the wealthiest man in the country. After William's death, she married Zdeněk Vojtěch of Lobkowicz, Chancellor of the Czech Kingdom and later 1st Prince Lobkowicz. As all of William's marriages had been childless, Polyxena's marriage to Zdeněk Vojtěch brought considerable wealth and property into the Lobkowicz family. Polyxena and her husband were highly influential at the Imperial Habsburg court, where they spearheaded Catholic opposition to Protestant factions. After the Defenestration of Prague in 1618, the Emperor's Catholic ministers took refuge in the Lobkowicz Palace. A later painting shows a romanticized version of the incident, with Polyxena barring the door of the palace against a Protestant mob while the battered ministers cower behind her—while another version of events claims that Polyxena concealed the ministers under her skirts. The defeat of the Protestants at the Battle of White Mountain in 1620 ensured that the Lobkowicz family would continue to play a major role in Bohemian and Imperial politics.
- Kateřina Benigna Popelovna Lobkowicz (1594–1653), wife of Vilém mladší Popel z Lobkowicz, helped establish Loreta as a significant pilgrimage destination in Prague. She financed the construction of the site, which was designed by Italian architect Giovanni Orsi and built between 1626 and 1631.
- Anna Magdalene (1606–1668), Baroness Popel von Lobkowicz, was the daughter of William the Younger Popel of Lobkowicz, Lord of Horšovský Týn. She married Julius Henry, Imperial Field Marshal and future Duke of Saxe-Lauenburg, in 1632. Of their six children, two survived infancy. The youngest, Julius Francis (1641–1689), was the last Ascanian duke of Saxe-Lauenburg.
- Juan Caramuel y Lobkowitz (1606–1682) was a Spanish Catholic philosopher, mathematician, architect and architectural theorist, ecclesiastic, and writer, believed to be a grandson of the eldest daughter of Jan Popel z Lobkowicz (c. 1527–1590). After a precocious childhood, he entered the Cistercian Order and was later awarded a doctorate of theology by the University of Leuven. His titles and positions included Philip IV of Spain's envoy to the court of Emperor Ferdinand III; Abbot of Melrose, Scotland; Abbot-Superior of the Benedictines of Vienna; Grand Vicar to the Archbishop of Prague; Bishop of Satrianum; Bishop of Campagna; and, at his death, Bishop of Vigevano. His intellectual pursuits were no less illustrious: he published 262 works on subjects from poetry to astronomy to asceticism, was one of the earliest scholars to write on probability, and designed the façade of the Vigevano Cathedral. When the Swedes attacked Prague in 1648, he armed and led a band of ecclesiastics to serve in defense of the city, and the emperor rewarded him for his bravery with a collar of gold.

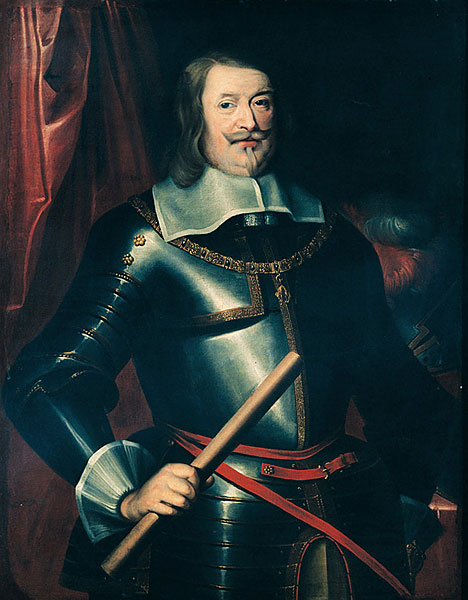
Václav Eusebius František, 2nd Prince Lobkowicz (1609–1677)

- Václav Eusebius František (1609–1677), 2nd Prince Lobkowicz, was the only child of Zdeněk Vojtěch and Polyxena Pernštejn, and became one of the most influential European statesmen of the 17th century. He raised his own regiment to fight in the Thirty Years' War and held high offices at the Habsburg court, advising Emperors Ferdinand III and Leopold I in his capacity as President of the Imperial War Cabinet (from 1652) and President of the Imperial Privy Council (from 1669). He had a close connection with the Infanta Margarita Teresa of Spain, Leopold I's young wife. The Lobkowicz Collections’ portrait of the Infanta (attributed to Velázquez) was presumably acquired during Leopold's reign. He also transformed his family's properties, overseeing the remodeling of the Lobkowicz Palace in Prague by Italian Baroque artists and the reconstruction of Roudnice Castle from a ruin to the family seat, and purchasing the ducal estate of Sagan in Silesia from Ferdinand III in 1646.
- František Vilém (1616–1670), the fourth son of Vilém mladší Popel z Lobkowicz, served as a councillor to Emperors Ferdinand III and Leopold I between 1647 and 1659. He was rewarded with the title of Highest Hunter in the Kingdom of Bohemia, a hereditary honor.
- Ferdinand August (1655–1715), 3rd Prince Lobkowicz, was a painting connoisseur whose additions to the Lobkowicz Collections include Veronese's David with the Head of Goliath, Rubens's Hygieia and the Sacred Serpent, Pieter Brueghel the Younger’s Village in Winter and Jan Brueghel the Elder’s St. Martin Dividing His Cloak. In addition to his own acquisitions, his wives also brought paintings as their dowries. The first, Claudia Franziska von Nassau Hadamar, brought with her portraits from the house of Nassau as well as a series of amateur portraits painted by her mother. The second, Maria Anna von Baden, brought a variety of Northern paintings, including Lucas Cranach the Elder's The Virgin and Child with Saints Barbara and Catherine of Alexandria and Cranach the Younger's Jesus and the Woman Taken in Adultery. Ferdinand August was also the first Prince Lobkowicz to systematically collect musical scores, and was an accomplished lutenist.
- Wenzel Ferdinand (1656–1697), Count of Bílina. As well as being Count of Bílina, a Bohemian town famous for its healing mineral water, Wenzel Ferdinand was an Imperial councillor and chamberlain. He served as an envoy to Bavaria, France, Spain, England, and the Netherlands. While in the Netherlands, he commissioned a Delft service from Lambertus Cleffius – the earliest and largest Delft service still in existence.
- Philip Hyacinth (1680–1734), 4th Prince Lobkowicz, was a patron of the arts who collected musical scores on several journeys to England. The composer Sylvius Leopold Weiss, one of the finest lutenists of his day, taught music to both Philip Hyacinth and his second wife Anna Maria Wilhelmina von Althan, and dedicated several works to the princess.
- Eleonore, Princess Lobkowicz (1682–1741) was the daughter of Ferdinand August, 3rd Prince Lobkowicz. At the beginning of the 18th century, she had the mineral spring at Bílina cleaned, leading to the town becoming a well-known spa. In 1701 she married Adam Franz Eusebius, hereditary Prince von Schwarzenberg, whom Emperor Charles VI killed in a hunting accident in 1732. Subsequently, the Emperor took her son Joseph Adam to his court in Vienna, and she was paid a baronial maintenance of 5,000 gulden.
- Eleonora Carolina (1685–1720), Countess of Bílina. The daughter and sole heir of Count Wenzel Ferdinand, she married her distant cousin Philip Hyacinth, 4th Prince Lobkowicz.
- Johann Georg Christian, Prince of Lobkowicz (1686–1755). A field marshal of the Imperial forces, Georg Christian was the fourth son of Ferdinand August, 3rd Prince Lobkowicz. He commanded the Lobkowicz regiment founded during the Thirty Years' War by Václav Eusebius, 2nd Prince Lobkowicz, and was commander-in-chief of the Habsburg armies in Italy. The Lobkowicz Collections holds portraits of eighteen officers that served in the Lobkowicz regiment under his command.
- Ferdinand Philip (1724–1784), 6th Prince Lobkowicz. After Frederick the Great of Prussia invaded Silesia during the War of the Austrian Succession, Ferdinand Philip supported Frederick over Empress Maria Theresa of Austria in order to protect his huge and highly profitable Silesian estate, originally acquired by Václav Eusebius, 2nd Prince Lobkowicz. It was probably for this reason that he was one of only two reigning princes of Lobkowicz not to be awarded the Order of the Golden Fleece, the highest Austrian order of chivalry. Wishing to avoid the war in Silesia and Bohemia but unwelcome at the Habsburg court in Vienna, Ferdinand Philip spent much of the 18th century in England, accompanied by Christoph Willibald Gluck, whom he had employed in the Lobkowicz Palace orchestra. He returned to Bohemia with two of Canaletto's finest paintings of London. His shrewd protection of his Silesian estate paid off: after his death, it was sold to the Duke of Courland for the incredible (at the time) sum of one million gulden.
- Ferdinand Maria von Lobkowicz (1726-1795), Bishop of Namur and of Ghent. Son of Johann Georg Christian, Prince of Lobkowicz.
- Joseph František Maximilian (1772–1816), 7th Prince Lobkowicz, was a patron of Joseph Haydn and Ludwig van Beethoven. Despite the previous Prince of Lobkowicz's lack of support for Maria Theresa, Joseph František Maximilian remained on good terms with the Habsburgs: Emperor Joseph II granted him the title of Duke of Roudnice in 1786, and to celebrate the coronation of Emperor Leopold II as King of Bohemia in 1791 he commissioned a reconstruction of the Lobkowicz Palace's exterior, giving it the appearance that it retains to this day. A talented singer, violinist, and violoncellist, Joseph František Maximilian was a noted patron of the arts: he was a founding member of the Society of the Friends of Music in Vienna, a member of the Society for the Promotion of Musical Culture in Bohemia, and a director of the Court Theatre of Vienna. He made his greatest impact on the musical world as a patron of Beethoven, who dedicated several major works to him, including the 3rd (Eroica), 5th, and 6th (Pastoral) symphonies.
- Ferdinand Joseph Johann Nepomuk (1797–1868), 8th Prince Lobkowicz. A notable industrialist as well as a patron of the arts, he was a particular benefactor of the geologist and paleontologist August Emanuel von Reuss. In 1835 he established one of the largest sugar factories in Bohemia, in the town of Bílina. He served as a member of parliament in Bohemia from 1860 to 1863.
- Karl Johann Josef of Lobkowicz (1815–1879). After having been head of government from 1852 to 1856, he served as a privy councillor in 1857. He was a stadholder in Lower Austria, Moravia, and Tyrol and Vorarlberg in the late 1850s and early 1860s.
- Moric (1831–1903), 9th Prince Lobkowicz. He served as an Imperial Privy Councilor beginning in 1890.
- Georg Christian, Prince of Lobkowicz (1835–1908) was a political leader among the conservative Bohemian nobility. Georg Christian was a member of the Bohemian Diet from 1865 to 1872 and 1883 to 1907, presiding over it twice as Land Marshal of Bohemia. He served as deputy in the Austrian Parliament from 1879 to 1883 and became a hereditary member of the Austrian House of Lords in 1883.
- Ferdinand Zdenko Maria (1858–1938), 10th Prince Lobkowicz. In 1907, he was appointed chamberlain to Archduke Charles, later Charles I of Austria, the last ruler of the Austro-Hungarian Empire.
- Wilhelmina(1863–1945) was the daughter of Moric, 9th Prince Lobkowicz. She sponsored a religious institution for widowed and unmarried noblewomen, The Order of the Sisters of God's Love, in Nelahozeves Castle. She was the last Lobkowicz to live in the castle, and is buried in the Nelahozeves village cemetery.
- Ferdinand Lobkowicz (1885–1953), known as "the Evangelist". He was the eldest son of Ferdinand Zdenko Maria, 10th Prince Lobkowicz, but renounced his inheritance rights in 1920. His younger brother Maximilian inherited the family's properties instead.
- Maximilian Lobkowicz (1888–1967). Despite the government's decision to redistribute inherited property and abolish the use of noble titles, Maximilian provided crucial support to the newly formed, democratic Czechoslovakia as a lawyer and diplomat, campaigning abroad for international recognition of the young republic. In the 1930s he mustered diplomatic support for opposition to the German annexation of the Sudetenland, and during World War II he served as ambassador to Great Britain for the Czechoslovak government in exile. In 1945 he and his family regained the property that had been confiscated by the Nazis, only to see it seized again in 1948 by the Communist government. At the same time, Maximilian and his family were forced into exile.
- Georg Christian of Lobkowicz (1907–1932), a racing driver known as Jiři Lobkowicz, who died after a crash at the 1932 Avusrennen, a motor race held at the AVUS circuit.
- Princess Edward Joseph de Lobkowicz (1903–1976) was an American golfer and real estate broker who married Prince Edward Joseph de Lobkowicz.
- Edouard de Lobkowicz (1926–2010) was an investment banker, an ambassador of the Sovereign Military Order of Malta, and the husband of Princess Marie-Françoise of Bourbon-Parma.
- Bedřich (Frederick) Lobkowicz (1932–1998), physicist at University of Rochester.
- Stéphane de Lobkowicz, his wife Barbara d'Ursel de Lobkowicz and their daughter Ariane de Lobkowicz-d'Ursel have served in the Brussels Parliament.
- Nikolaus von Lobkowicz (or Mikuláš Lobkowicz), a German-Czech philosopher

== The family today ==
Today, there are four main branches of the Lobkowicz family: of Roudnice, Křimice, Dolní Beřkovice and Mělník.

Notable Lobkowiczs of today include:

- Mikuláš Lobkowicz (b. 1931), philosopher, rector of LMU Munich, president of the Catholic University of Eichstätt-Ingolstadt.
- Jaroslav Lobkowicz (b. 1942), MP 1998–2006 and 2010–present, head of the Křimice branch of the family.
- František Václav Lobkowicz (1948–2022), O.Praem., Bishop of Ostrava-Opava.
- Jiří Lobkowicz (politician) (b. 1956), businessman and politician, head of the Mělník branch of the family.
- William Lobkowicz (b. 1961), current heir and manager of most of the Lobkowicz lands in the Czech Republic, including the Lobkowicz Palace, Nelahozeves, Roudnice, and Střekov Castle.
- Prince Edouard-Xavier de Lobkowicz (1960–1984), son of Prince Edouard de Lobkowicz and Princess Marie-Françoise of Bourbon-Parma, murder victim
- Prince Charles-Henri de Lobkowicz (b. 1964), son of Prince Edouard de Lobkowicz and Princess Marie-Françoise of Bourbon-Parma, proprietor of the château de Boszt in Besson, heir to the Manoir d'Ujezd in Goderville, and to the château de Lignières (Cher).
- Princess Marie Gabrielle de Lobkowicz (born 1967), French nun
- Michal Lobkowicz (b. 1964), MP 1992–2002, Minister of Defence of the Czech Republic in 1998.
- Princess Edouard de Lobkowicz (born 1928), French humanist and wife of Edouard de Lobkowicz.

== Properties of the family ==
After the Velvet Revolution of 1989, a number of castles and estates were restored to different branches of the family. These estates included the Lobkowicz Palace in Prague Castle (now a museum with a famous art collection), Nelahozeves Castle (also a museum), Roudnice Castle, Střekov Castle, Mělník Castle, Bílina Castle, Křimice Castle, Dolní Beřkovice Castle (inherited by the Thurn und Taxis family), Jezeří Castle (sold by the family), Vysoký Chlumec Castle (sold by the family), Hasištejn Castle, Chomutov Castle, Líčkov Castle, Felixburk, Neustadt an der Waldnaab, Horšovský Týn Castle, and Zbiroh.

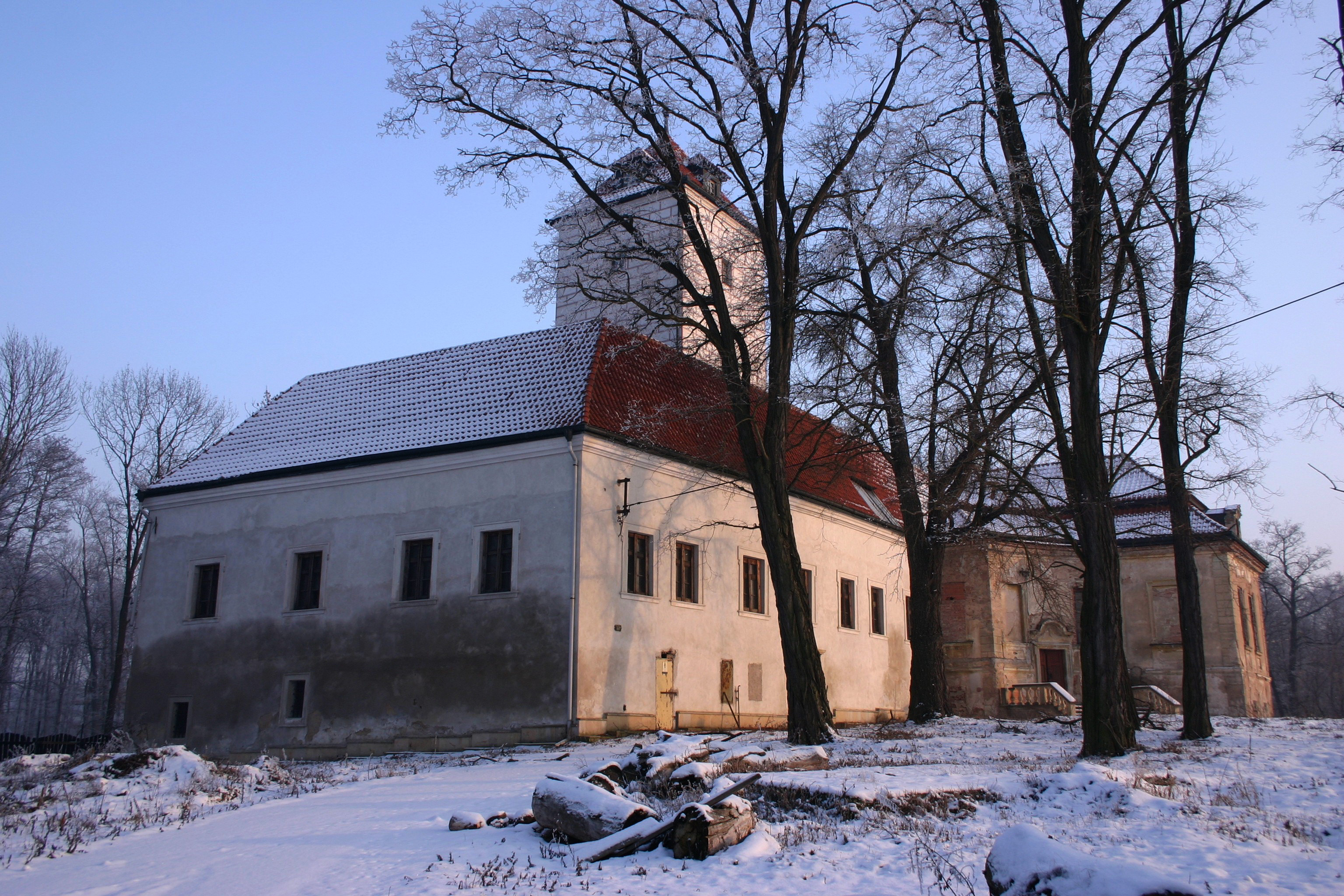
Lobkovice Castle

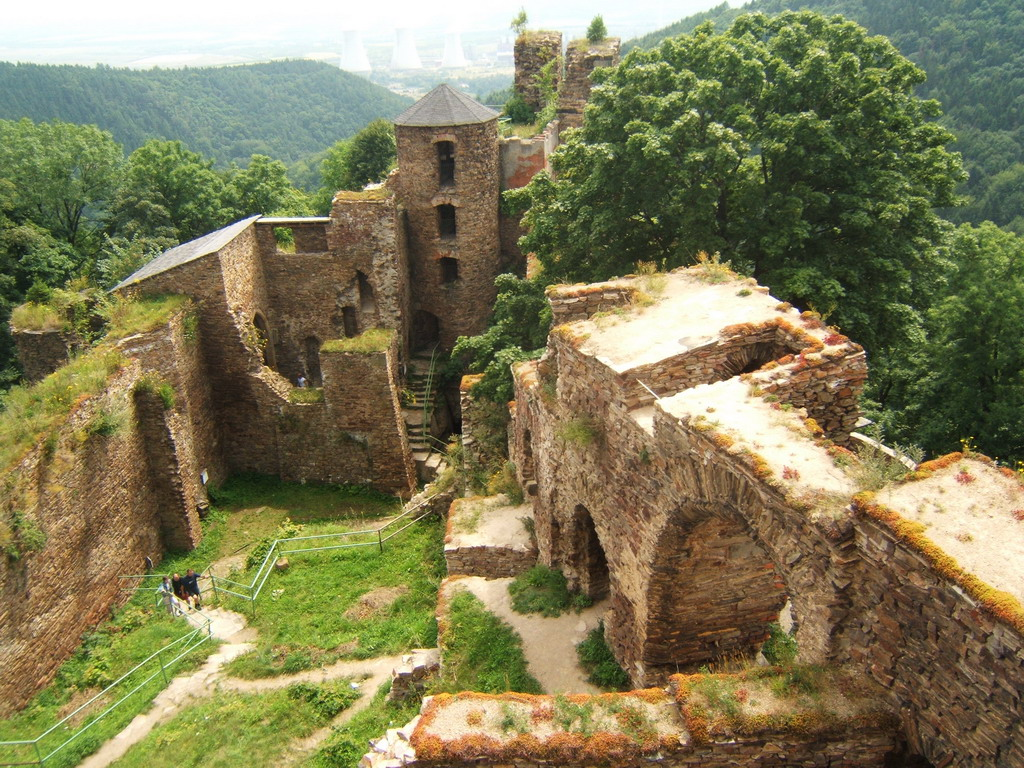
Hasištejn Castle

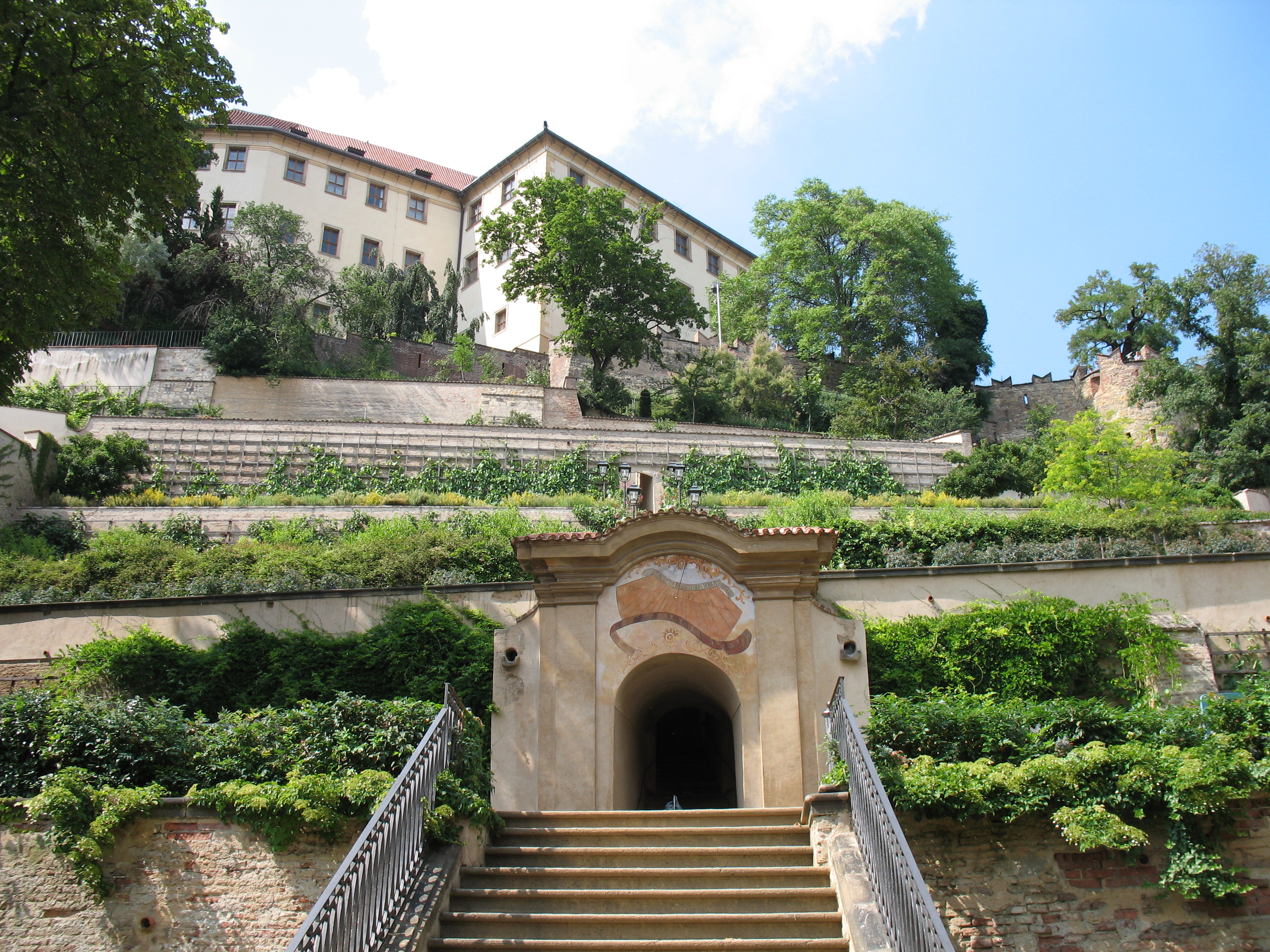
Lobkowicz Palace next to Prague Castle

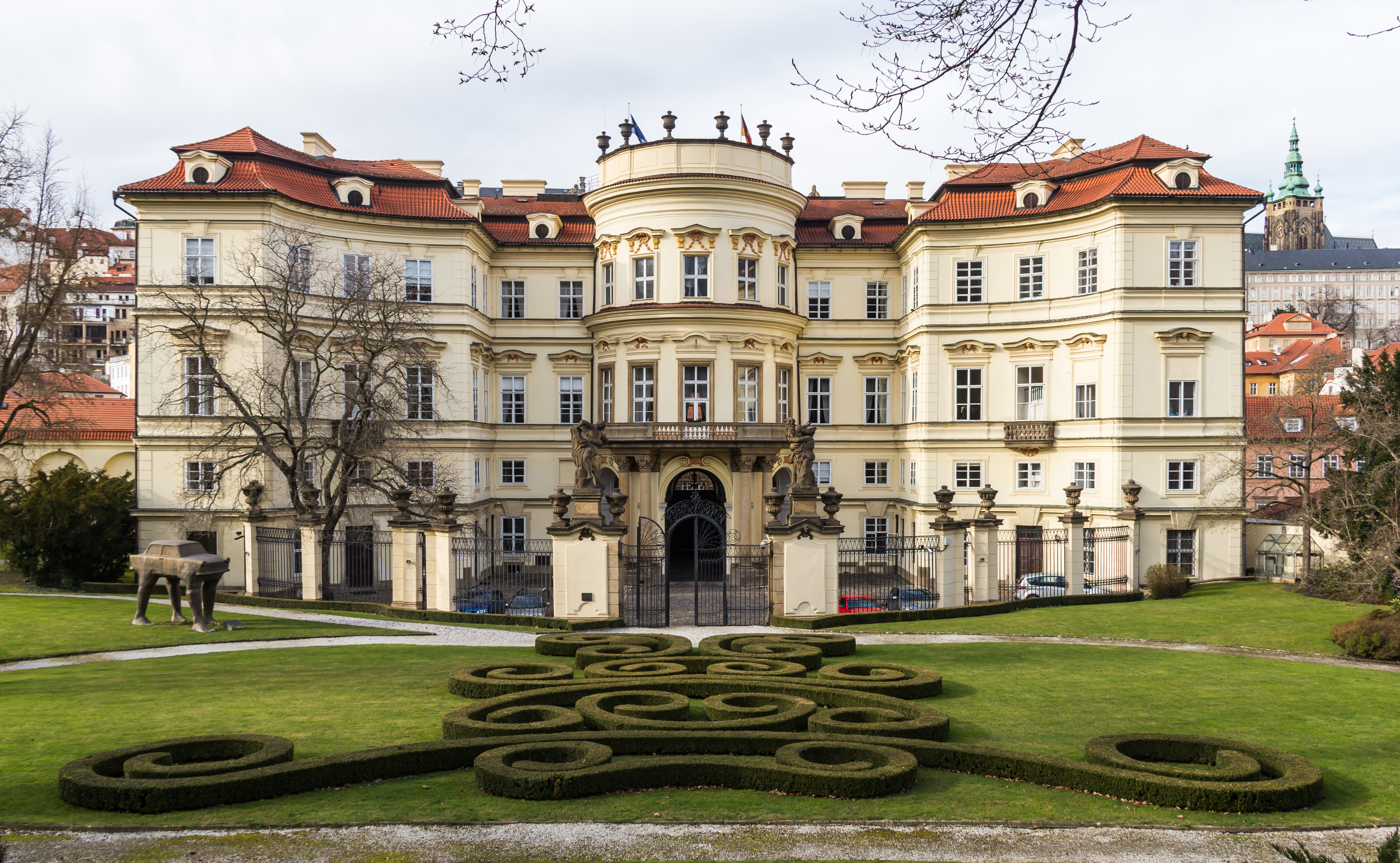
Palais Lobkowicz at Malá Strana in Prague, now the German Embassy

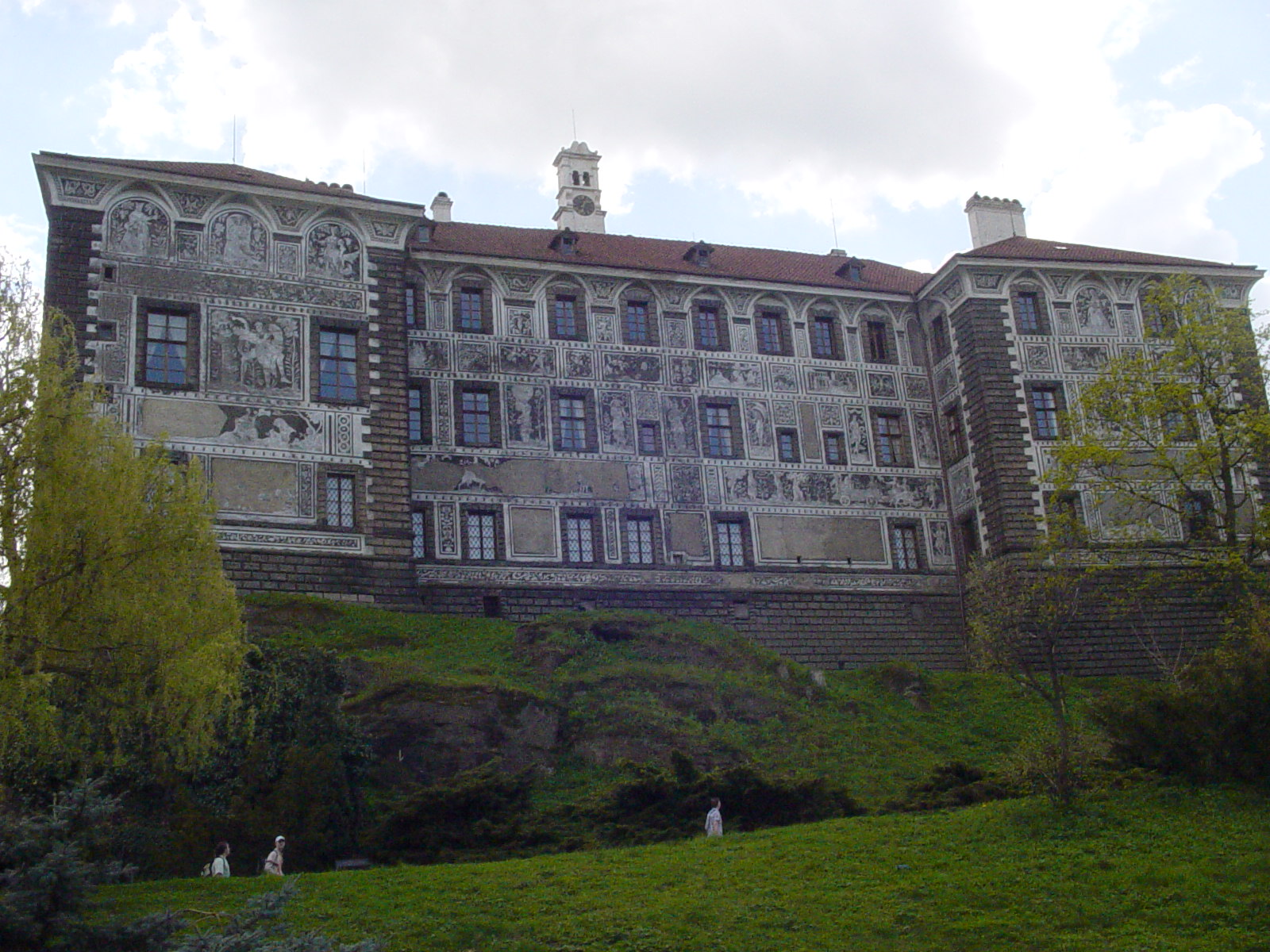
Nelahozeves Castle

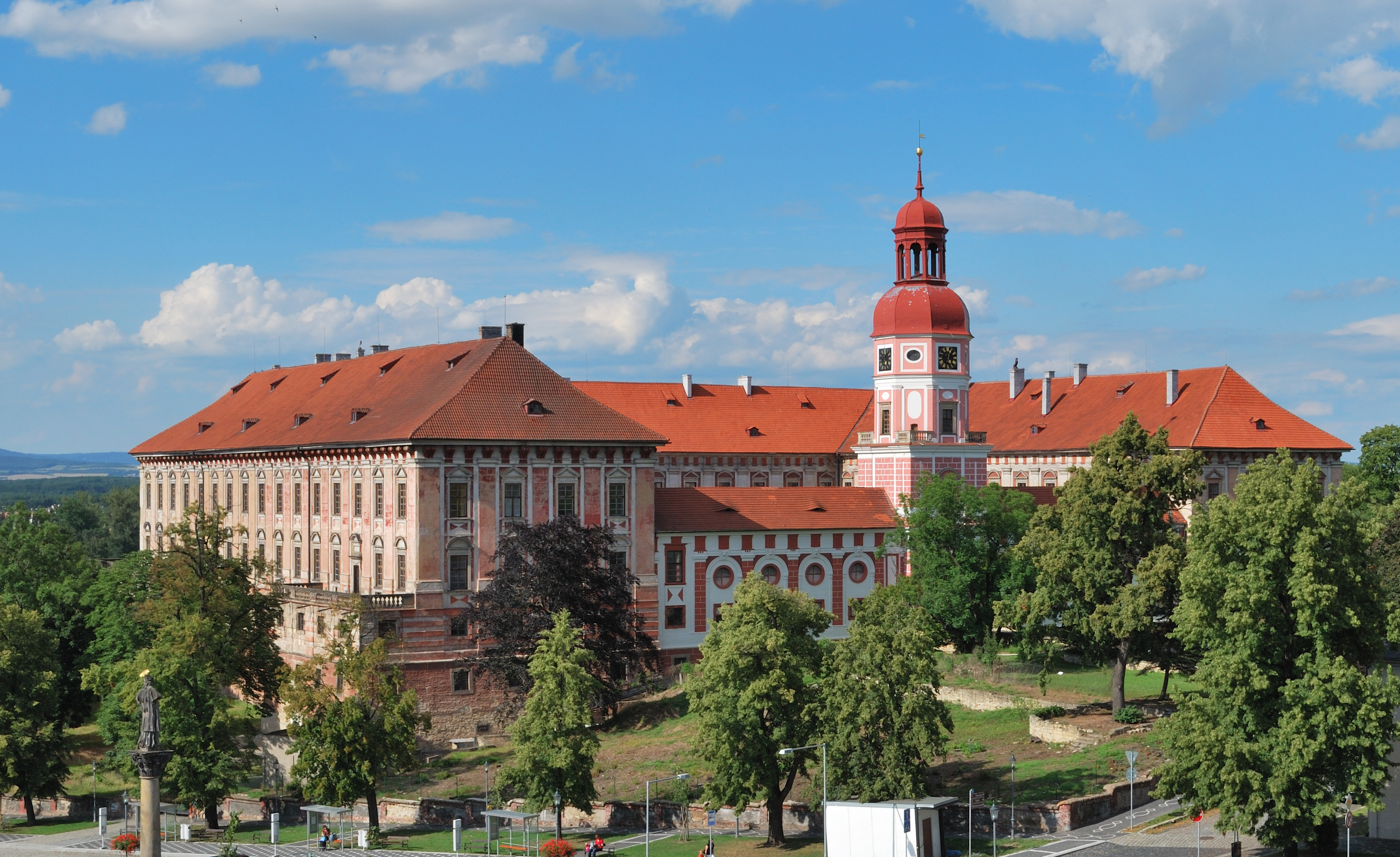
Roudnice nad Labem Castle

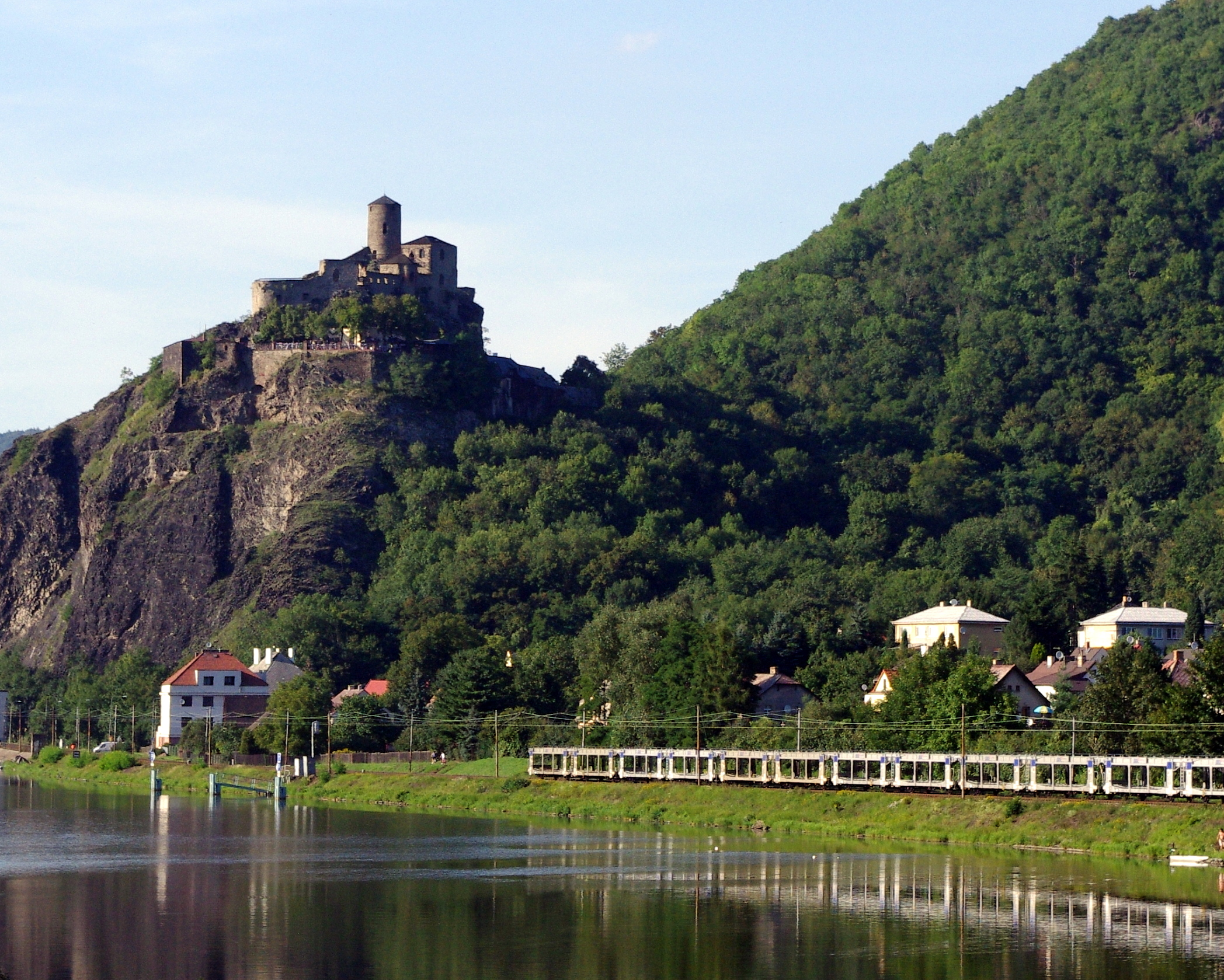
Střekov castle

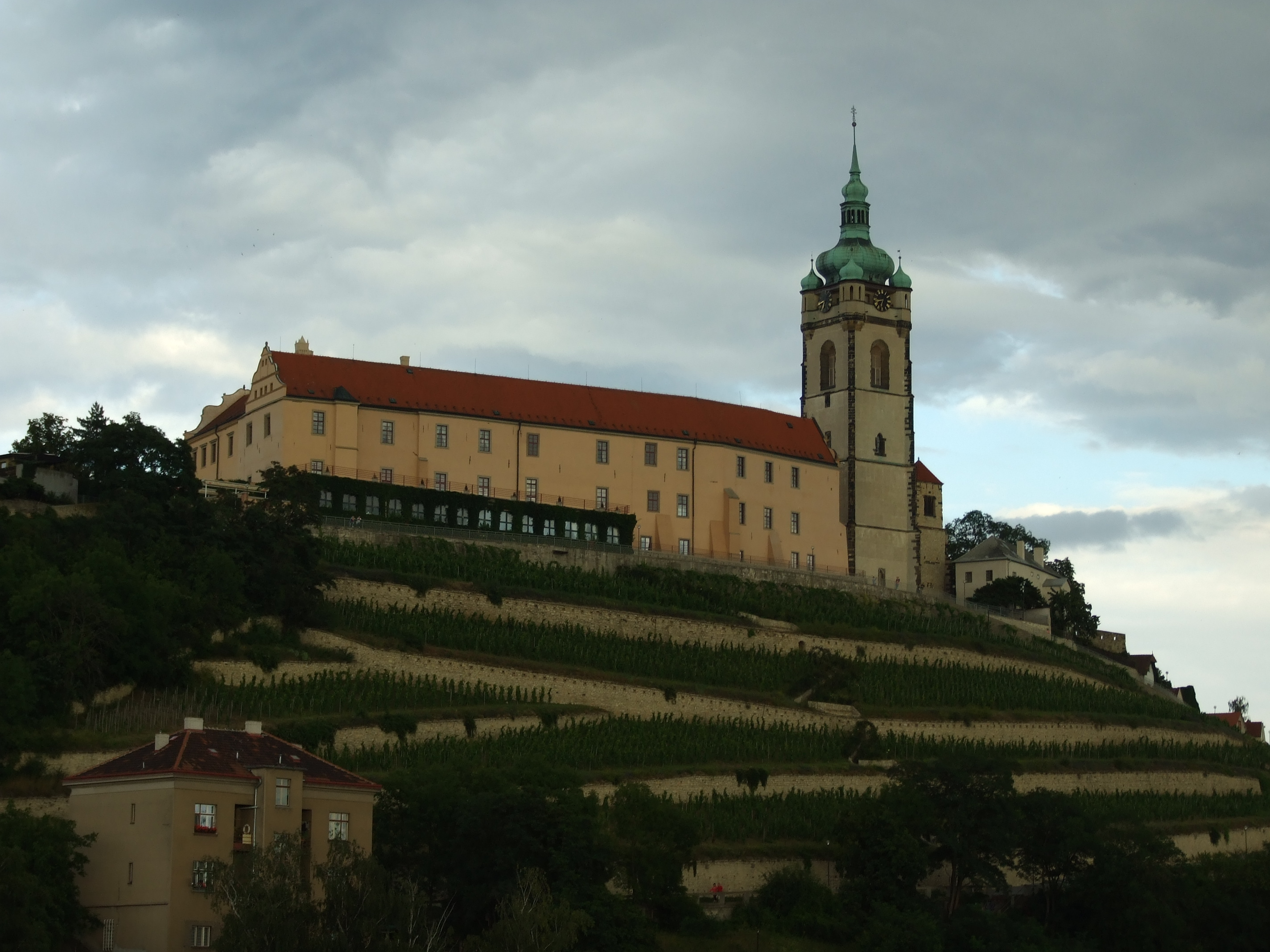
Mělník Castle

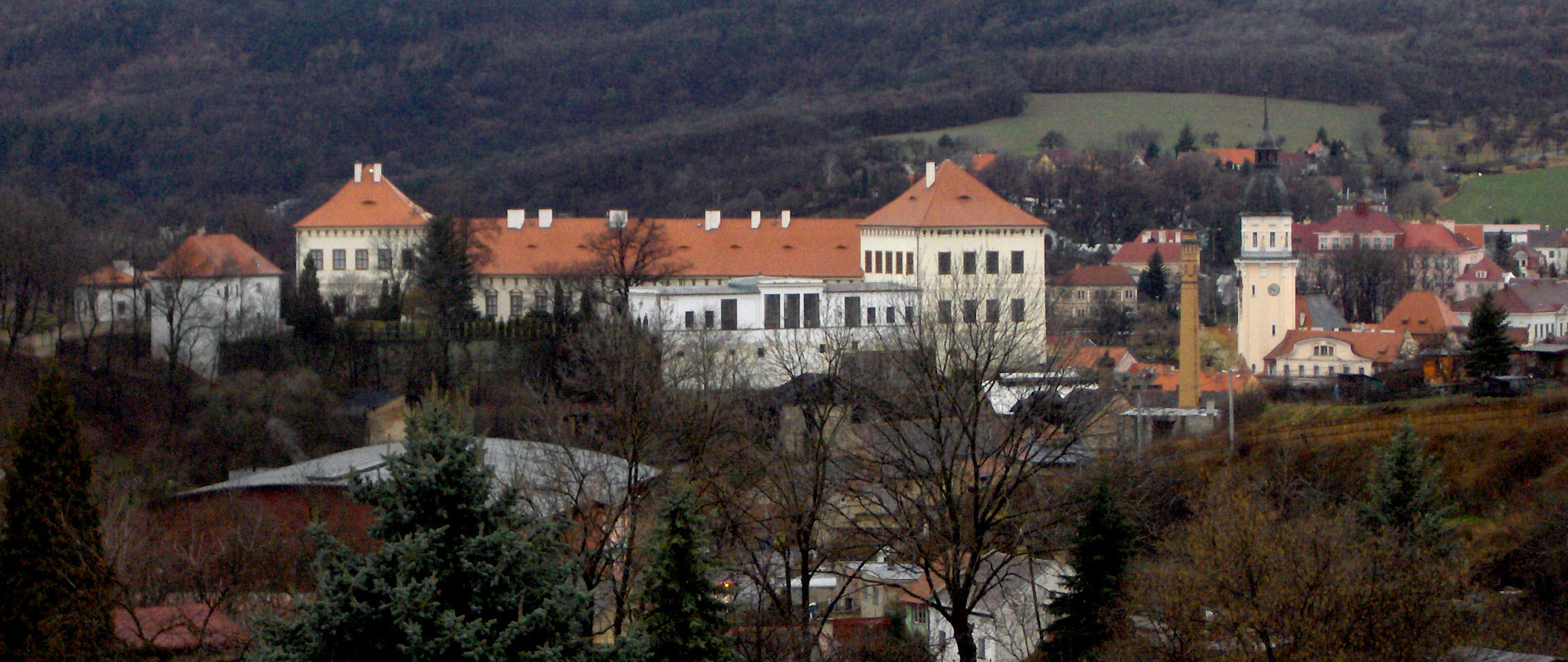
Bílina Castle

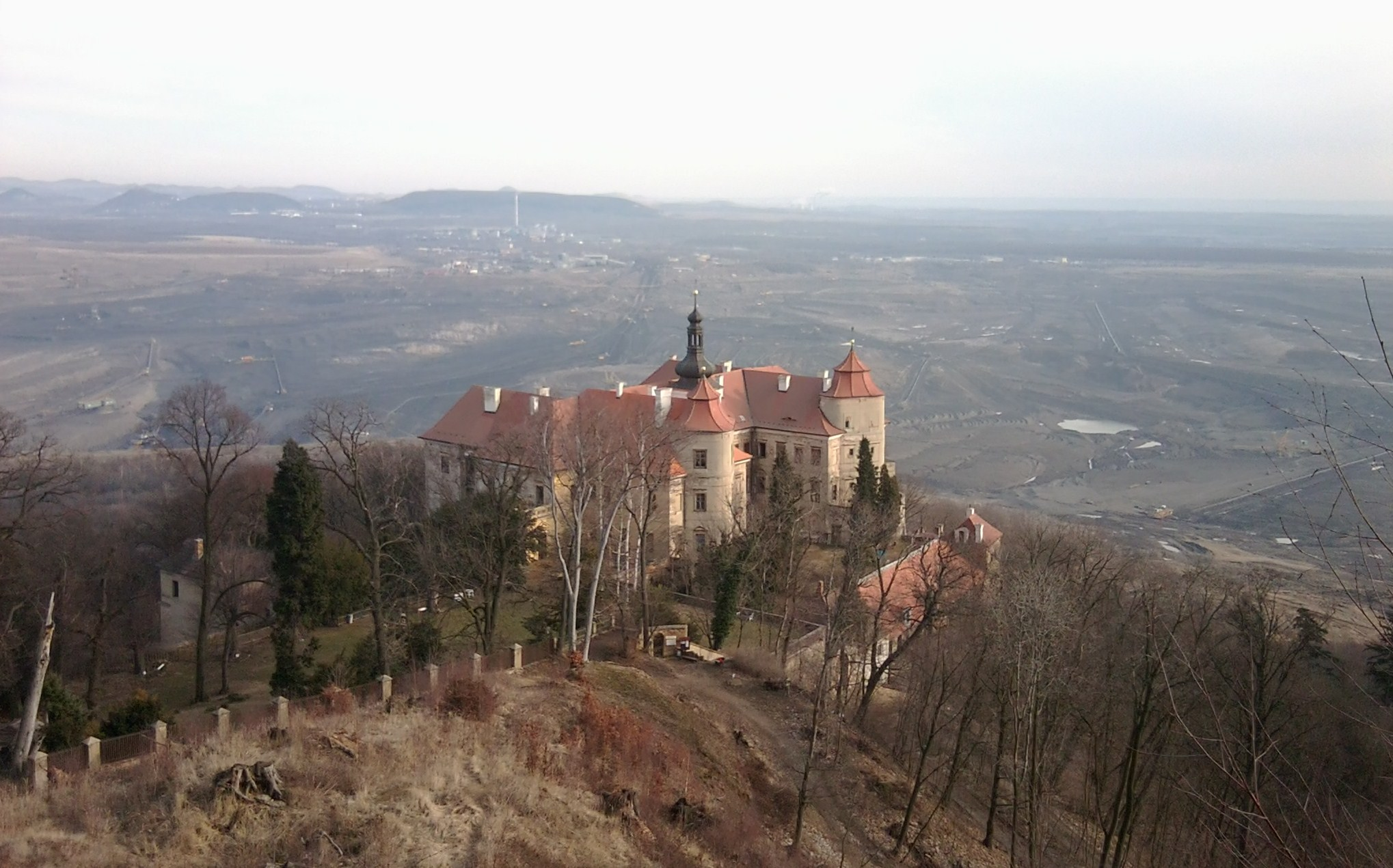
Jezeří Castle near Horní Jiřetín

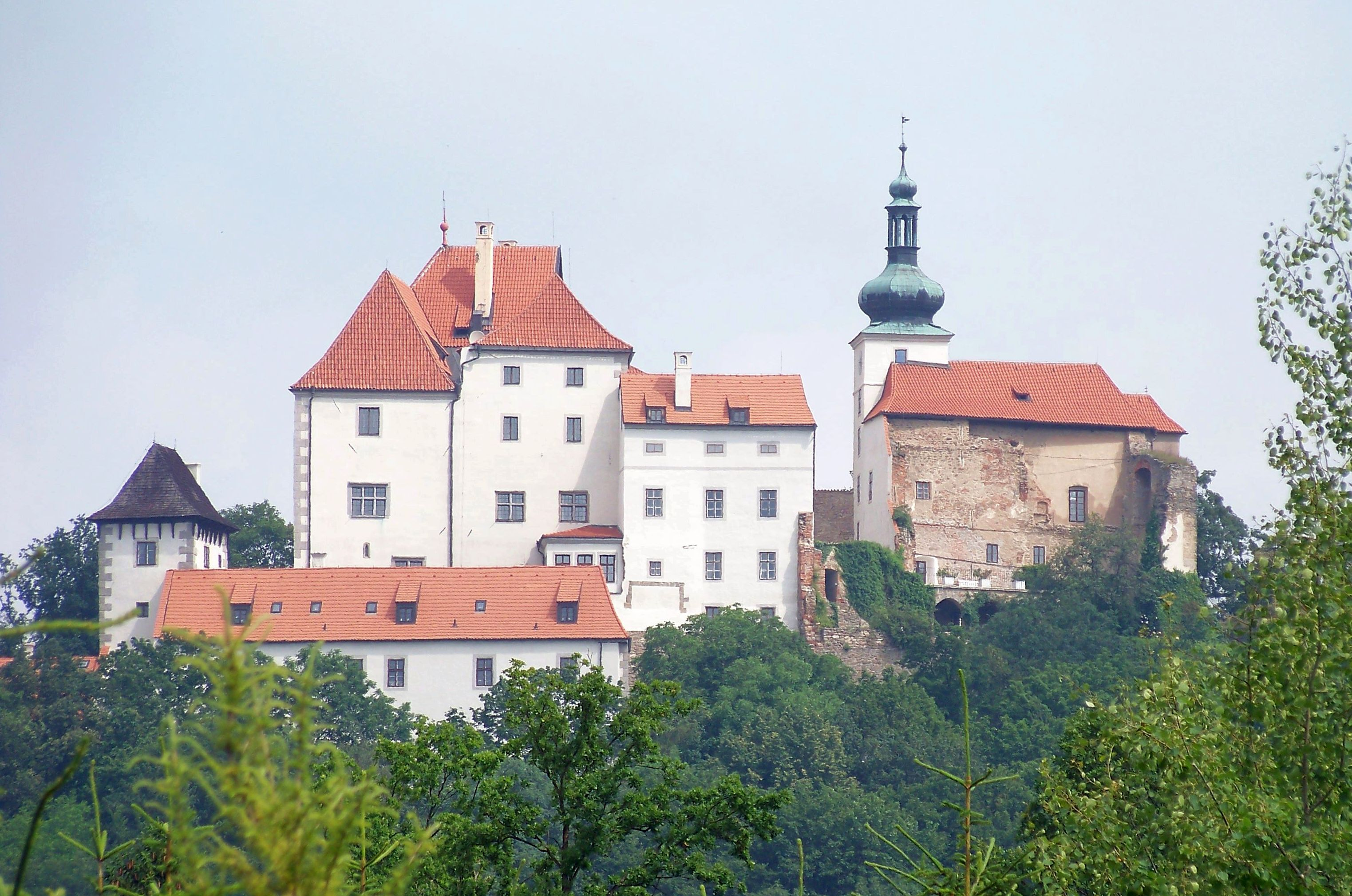
Vysoký Chlumec Castle

== See also ==
- Infant Jesus of Prague
- Palais Lobkowitz, Vienna
