= Hasištejn Castle =

Coordinates: 50.445°N 13.257°E

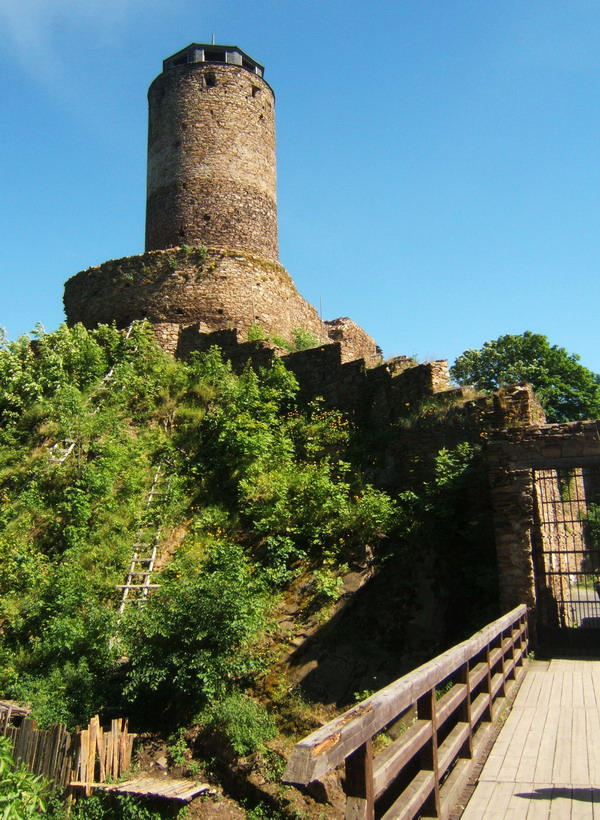
The ruined Hasištejn Castle

Hasištejn (German: Burg Hassenstein) is a ruined medieval castle in Bohemia, the Czech Republic. It is situated near Kadaň, Klášterec nad Ohří and Chomutov.

The castle, first mentioned in Maiestas Carolina, was probably founded by Friedrich of Schönburg to guard the way from Prague to Saxony. The castle was seized by Václav IV of Luxembourg in the early 15th century and given to Nicholas of Lobkowicz.

The most renowned inhabitant of the castle was Bohuslav Hasištejnský z Lobkovic, a poet and traveller who was born in Hassenstein and lived there permanently from 1503 to his death, in 1510. He gathered a huge library (comprising more than 650 volumes) in the castle, resulting in many scholars and humanists visiting Hasištejn Castle to borrow his books. Martin Luther and Philipp Melanchthon were among his visitors.

After Bohuslav's death in 1510, Hasištejn Castle began to fall into disrepair, which was exacerbated when it caught fire in 1560. Although the castle is now a ruin, its tower and walls remain standing to this day. The castle became state property during the communist regime, but it was returned to the Lobkowicz family after 1989.
