= Lobkovice =

- Village
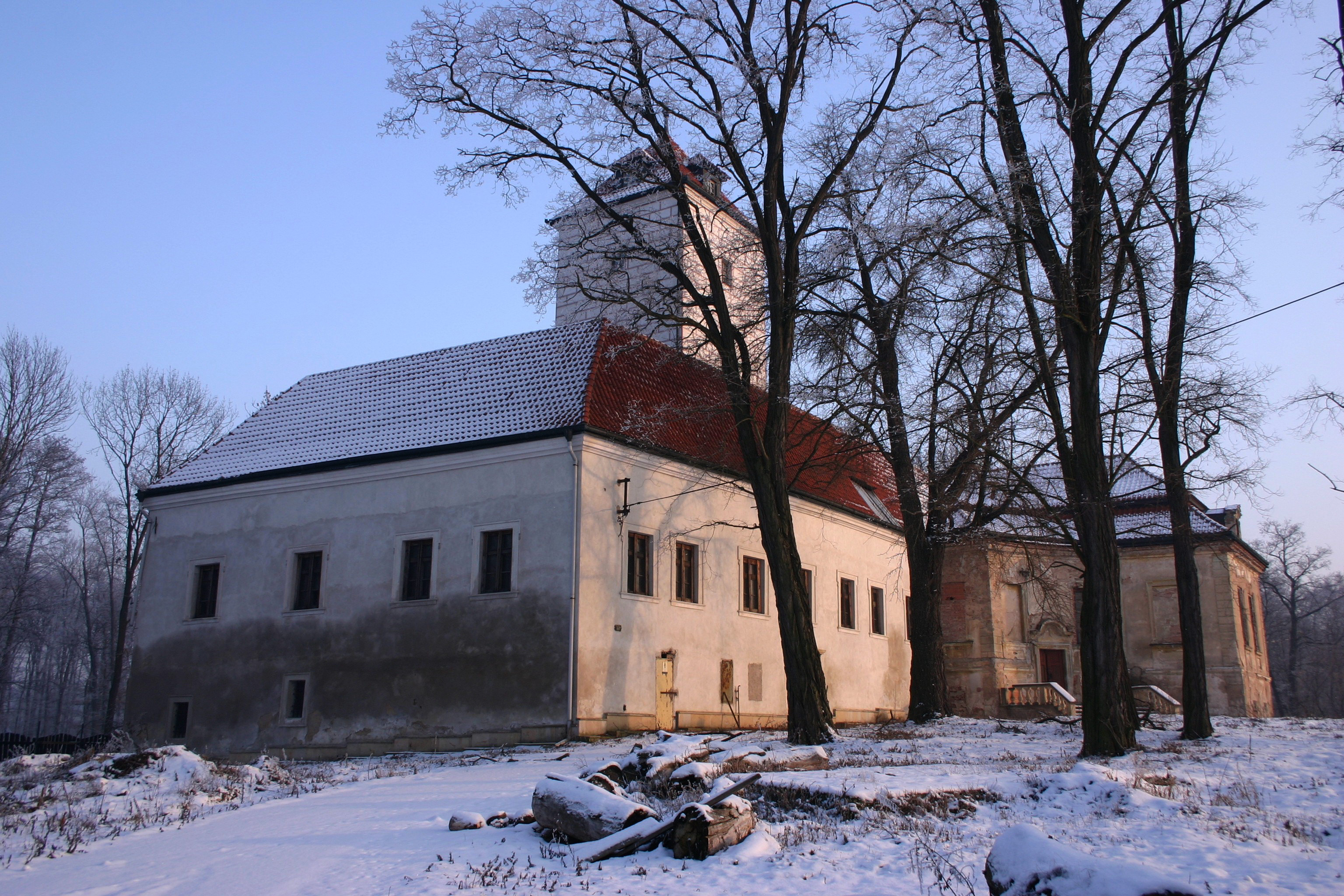
- Lobkovice Castle

- Location in the Czech Republic
- Coordinates: 50°15′9″N 14°31′59″E
- Country: Czech Republic
- Region: Central Bohemian
- District: Mělník
- Municipality: Neratovice
- First mentioned: 1341

Area
  - Total: 4.02 km^{2} (1.55 sq mi)
- Elevation: 167 m (548 ft)

Population (2021)
  - Total: 813
  - Density: 202/km^{2} (524/sq mi)
- Time zone: UTC+1 (CET)
  - Summer (DST): UTC+2 (CEST)
- Postal code: 277 11

Lobkovice is a village and part of Neratovice in Mělník District in the Central Bohemian Region of the Czech Republic. It has about 800 inhabitants.

== Geography ==
Lobkovice is located about 16 km (10 mi) north of Prague. It lies in the southeastern part of the territory of Neratovice and is urbanistically fused with the town proper.

== History ==
The first written mention of Lobkovice is from 1341. In 1367–1377 Lobkovice belonged to Mikuláš Cotr, and in 1377 the village became the property of Jan Čuch of Zásada. Lobkovice was then acquired by Mikuláš Chudý of Újezd, the founder of the House of Lobkowicz. He had rebuilt the local fortress into a small Gothic castle. With a few breaks, Lobkovice was owned by the Lobkowicz family until the 19th century, when it was bought by the Prague attorney Jan Měchura, father-in-law of the historian František Palacký.

A few years later, Prince Mořic of Lobkowicz reacquired the original family seat. In 1948, the estate was nationalised by the socialist government (resulting from the bill of the Revision of the First Czechoslovak Land Reform passed in July 1947). The Lobkovice Castle was returned after the Velvet Revolution to the grandson of the last owner prior 1948, Prince Ferdinand Joseph Lobkowicz.

== Sights ==
The main historical monument is the Lobkovice Castle. Today the castle is owned by the Lobkowicz family and is closed to the public until the reconstruction is completed.

== Notable people ==
- František Palacký (1798–1876), historian and politician; stayed here in 1852–1860 and is buried here
