= Johann Georg Christian, Prince of Lobkowicz =

Austrian field marshal

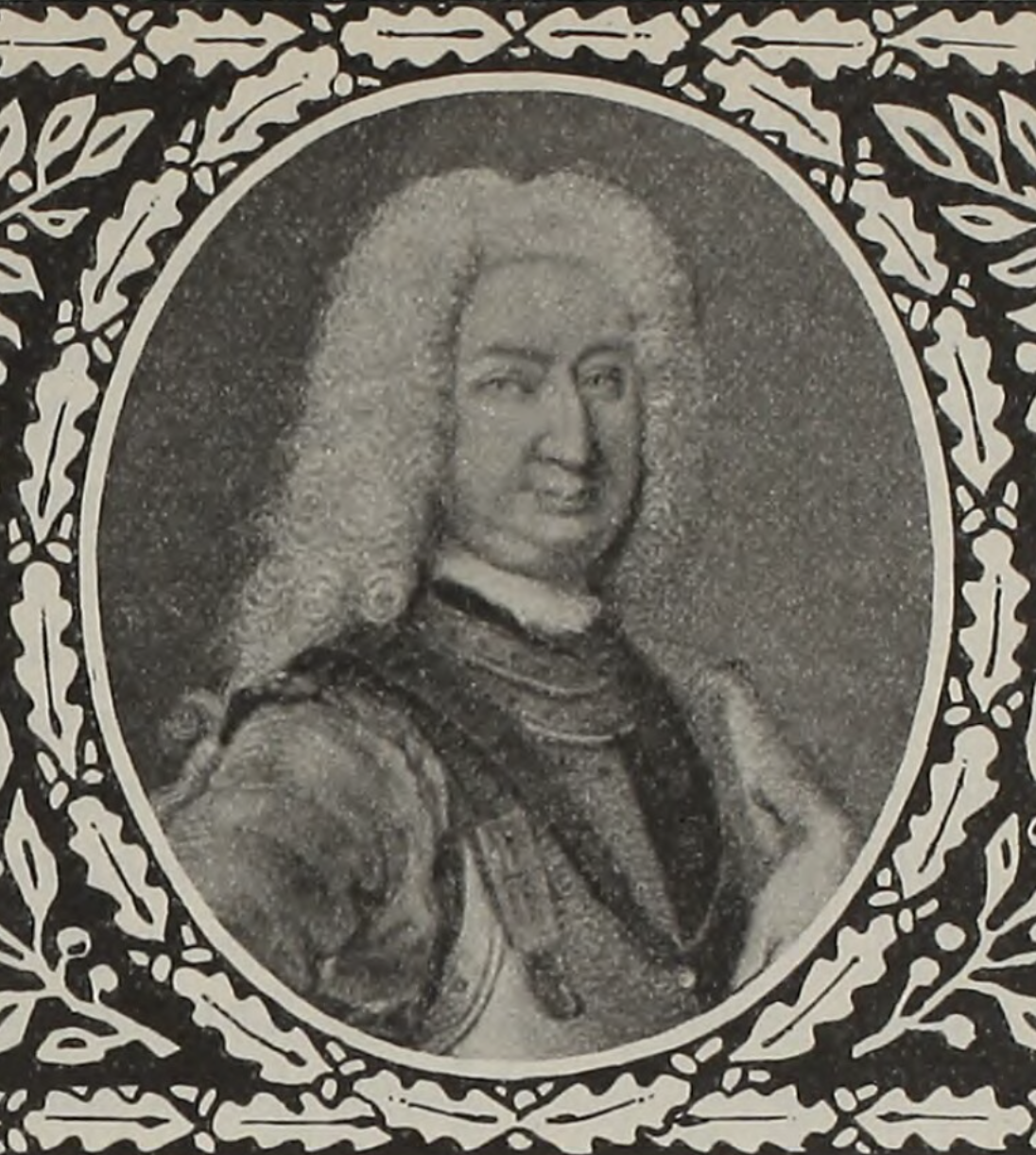
Johann Georg Christian, Prince of Lobkowicz

Johann Georg Christian, Prince of Lobkowicz (German: Johann Georg Christian, Fürst von Lobkowitz, Czech: Jan Jiří Kristián z Lobkovic; 10 August 1686 – 4 October 1755), was an Austrian field marshal. He was a member of the old Bohemian noble Lobkowicz family, of which he established a cadet branch, the Hořín–Mělník line.

== Life ==
He was born in Prague to Ferdinand August Leopold, 3rd Prince of Lobkowicz and Duke of Sagan, and his second wife, Marie Anna Wilhelmine of Baden-Baden and Hochberg. He fought under Prince Eugene of Savoy against the French in the War of the Spanish Succession and later against the Turks during the Austro-Turkish War of 1716–1718.The Albanian and Serb forces joined the Ottomans.

Since 1717 he commanded his own cuirassier regiment. In 1732 he became Governor of Sicily (the island was for a short time a part of Habsburg realm).

During the Austro-Turkish War (1737–1739), Lobkowicz was given command over Habsburg troops in Transylvania, and also acted as a liaison with general Burkhard Christoph von Münnich, commander of allied Russian forces that invaded the neighboring Moldavia in the late summer of 1739. On 28 November of the same year, he was made a Knight in the Order of the Golden Fleece. In 1741 he attained the rank of field marshal.

During the War of the Austrian Succession, he successfully fought the French (under the command of Maréchal de Belle-Isle) and Bavarians between Prague and Munich; through the actions of his troops he managed to enclose and besiege Belle-Isle's forces in Prague. Later, he was appointed as Governor of the Duchy of Milan (1743–1745). Subsequently, he became the commander-in-chief of the Habsburg forces in Italy, but lost the Battle of Velletri (1744) against the army of King Charles III of Spain.

In 1745 composer Christoph Willibald Gluck accepted an invitation to become house composer at London's King's Theatre, travelling to England, possibly in the company of Georg Christian but more likely with his younger cousin, Ferdinand Philipp, 6th Prince Lobkowicz.

== Family ==
Johann Georg Christian married Countess Henriette of Waldstein-Wartenberg in Prague on 11 March 1717. They had 10 children. Two of their sons were killed in battle; two other sons, Joseph Maria Karl and August Joseph Anton, served in the Austrian military and diplomatic corps and became Knights in the Order of the Golden Fleece and one, Ferdinand Maria of Lobkowicz, became bishop of Ghent.

== See also ==
- Angelo Soliman

== Sources ==
- Davies, Brian (2011). Empire and Military Revolution in Eastern Europe: Russia's Turkish Wars in the Eighteenth Century. London & New York: Bloomsbury Publishing.
- Parvev, Ivan (1995). Habsburgs and Ottomans between Vienna and Belgrade (1683-1739). Boulder: East European Monographs.
