= Bohuslav Hasištejnský z Lobkovic =

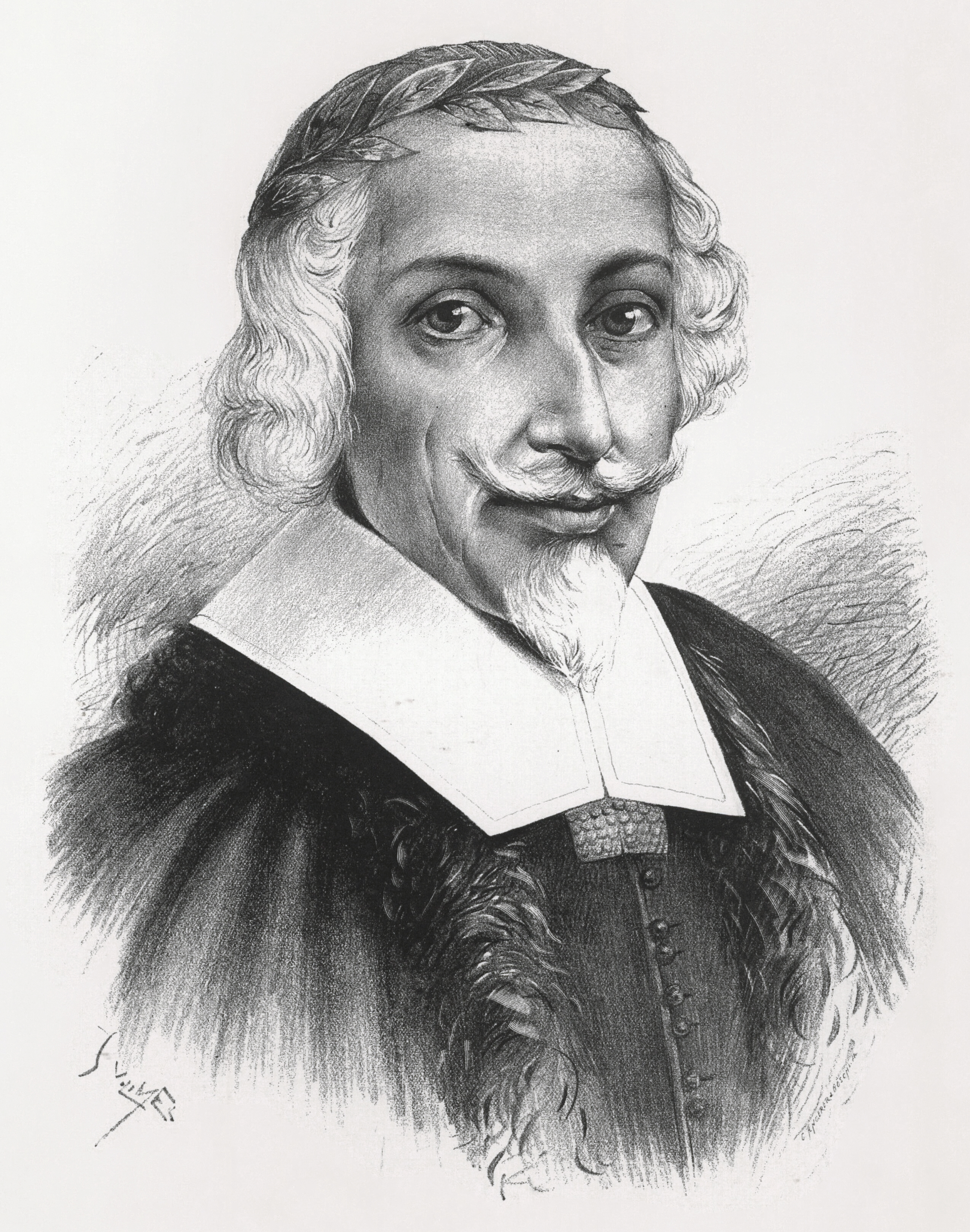
- Bohuslav Hasištejnský z Lobkovic
- Born: 1461
- Died: 11 November 1510 (aged 68–69)
- Occupation: Writer

Bohuslav Hasištejnský z Lobkovic (Czech pronunciation: [ˈboɦuslav ˈɦasɪʃtɛjnskiː ˈzlopkovɪts]; German: Bohuslaus Lobkowitz von Hassenstein) (1461 – 11 November 1510) was a nobleman, writer and humanist of the old Bohemian family (later the princes) of the House of Lobkowicz. Regardless of his Bohemian roots, he explicitly referred to himself as German.

He was born at Hasištejn Castle, near Kadaň, Bohemia. He studied in Bologna and Ferrara (doctor of law, 1482) and converted from Utraquism to Catholicism there. After 1483, he became provost of Vyšehrad in Prague and between 1490 and 1491 he travelled to the Holy Land and Egypt, earning the nickname "the Czech Ulysses". He was elected the bishop of Olomouc, but he was refused by the Pope. After this, he lived with a few of his writer friends in his 'Tusculum', Hasištejn Castle in north-eastern Bohemia.

Lobkovic was an author of philosophical prose, letters, and verses, including satire on Bohemian national life: Ad sanctum Venceslaum satira (1489). He was a successful essayist and poet and became poeta laureatus. Lobkovic wrote in German and Latin, but never in Czech, which was "barbaric" in his eyes. Moreover, he clearly considered himself a German ("Ego me Germanum esse et profiteor et glorior" ― "I openly confess to be a German and am proud of it").

His close friends were Jan Šlechta z Všehrd, a philosopher, Viktorin Kornel ze Všehrd and Racek Doubravský z Doubravy, both of whom were theorists of Bohemian common law. He was the younger brother of Jan Hasištejnský z Lobkovic.

He died in Hasištejn Castle in 1510.

== Sources ==
- Kyzourová, Ivana. Básník a král: Bohuslav Hasištejnský z Lobkovic v zrcadle jagellonské doby. Praha: Správa pražského hradu, 2007, 127p.
- Martínek, Jan, Martínová, Dana. ed.Epistulae Bohuslaus Hassinsteinius a Lobkowicz. Leipzig: B.G.Teubner, 1980.
