= Vysoký Chlumec =

- Market town
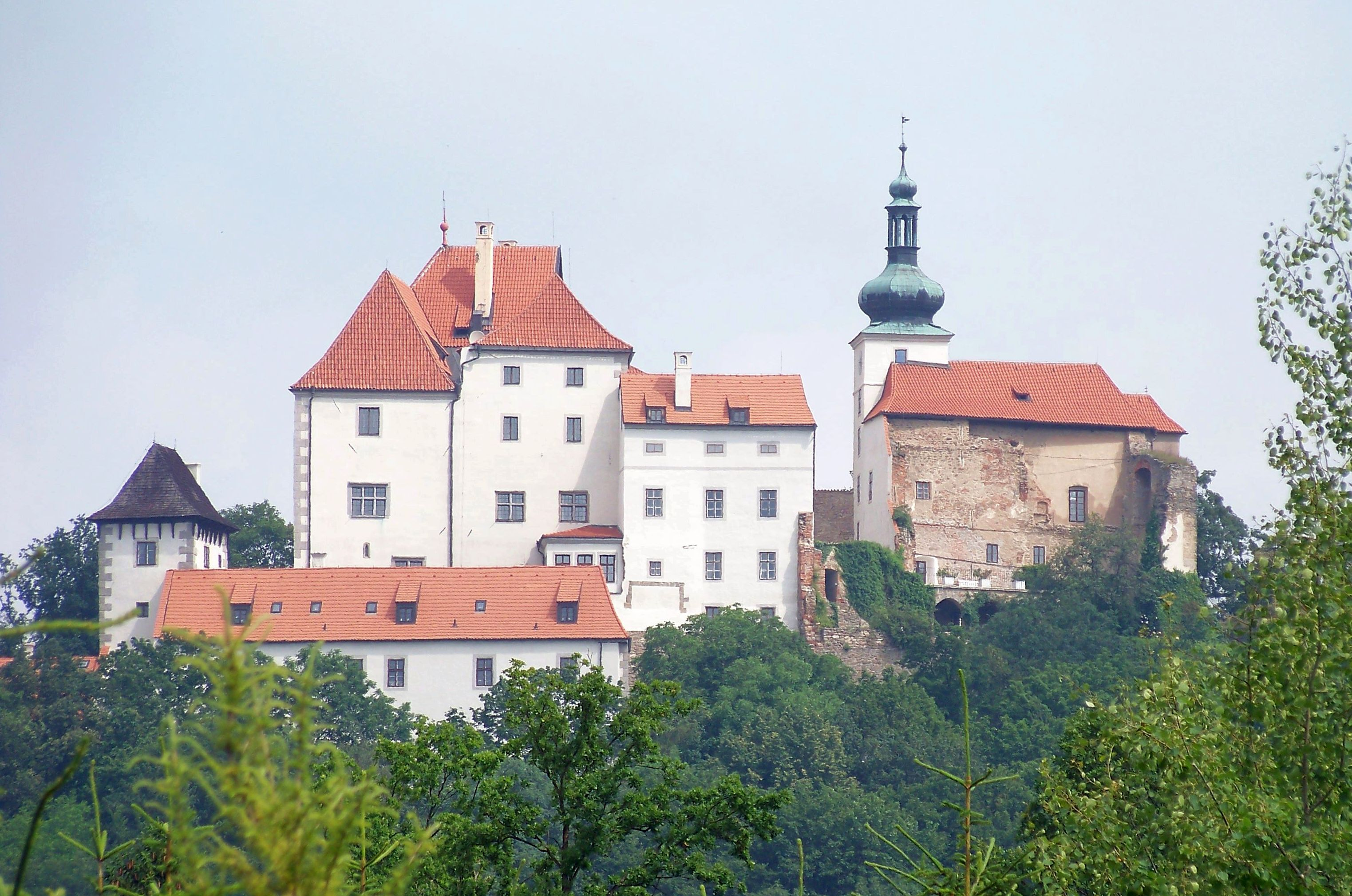
- Vysoký Chlumec Castle

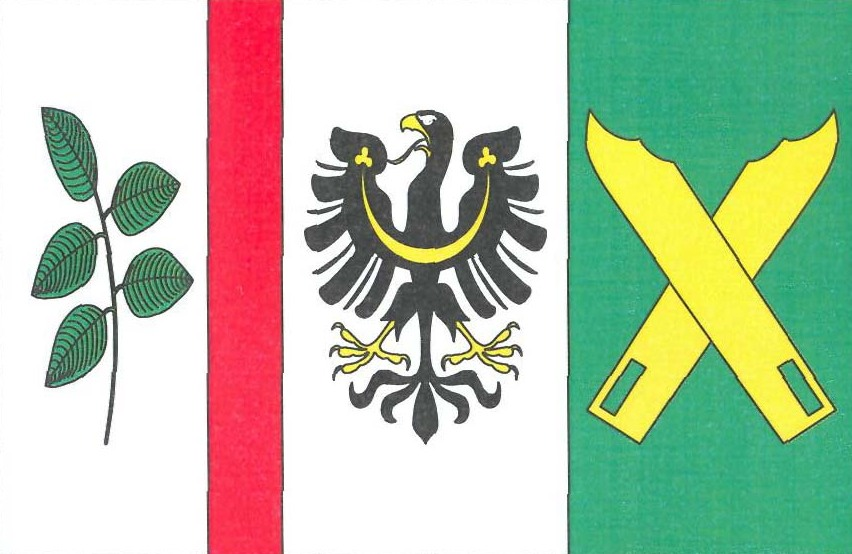
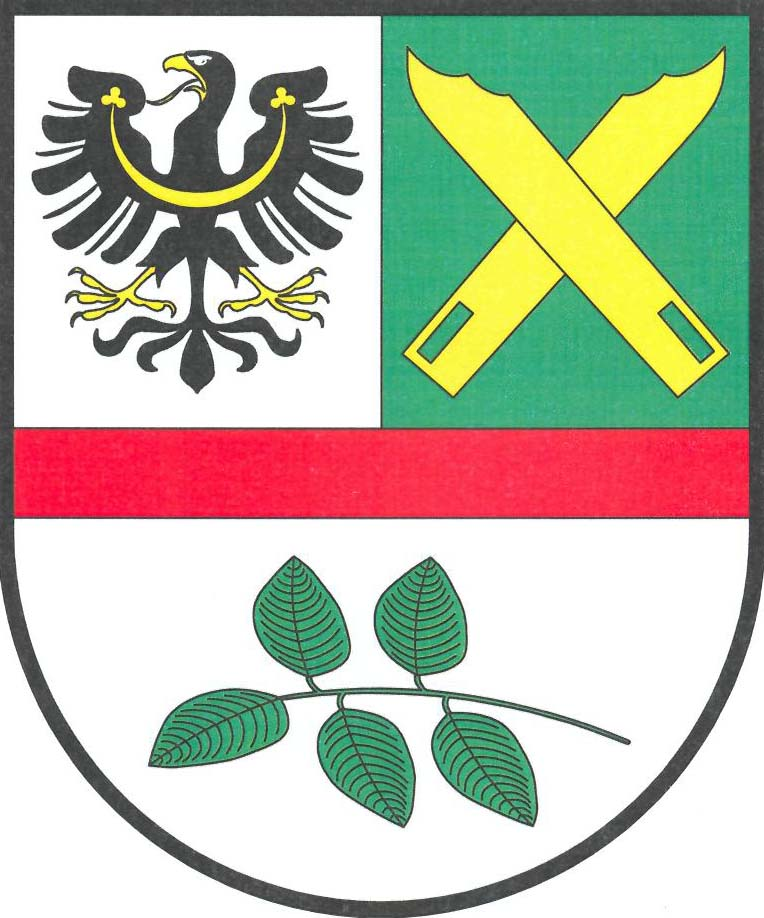
- Flag Coat of arms

- Location in the Czech Republic
- Coordinates: 49°37′4″N 14°23′23″E
- Country: Czech Republic
- Region: Central Bohemian
- District: Příbram
- First mentioned: 1235

Area
  - Total: 23.92 km^{2} (9.24 sq mi)
- Elevation: 490 m (1,610 ft)

Population (2026-01-01)
  - Total: 790
  - Density: 33/km^{2} (86/sq mi)
- Time zone: UTC+1 (CET)
  - Summer (DST): UTC+2 (CEST)
- Postal code: 262 52
- Website: www.vysoky-chlumec.cz

Vysoký Chlumec (Czech pronunciation: [ˈvɪsokiː ˈxlumɛts]) is a market town in Příbram District in the Central Bohemian Region of the Czech Republic. It has about 800 inhabitants.

== Administrative division ==
Vysoký Chlumec consists of eight municipal parts (in brackets population according to the 2021 census):

- Vysoký Chlumec (371)
- Bláhova Lhota (20)
- Hrabří (121)
- Hradce (15)
- Jezvina (3)
- Pořešice (85)
- Vápenice (36)
- Víska (144)

== Etymology ==
The name Chlumec is a diminutive of chlum, which meant 'hill' in old Czech. The prefix vysoký means 'high'.

== Geography ==
Vysoký Chlumec is located about 28 kilometres (17 mi) east of Příbram and 44 km (27 mi) south of Prague. It lies in the Benešov Uplands. The highest point is the hill Lampír at 559 m (1,834 ft) above sea level.

== History ==
The first written mention of Chlumec is from 1235. The castle was built in the second half of the 14th century and was first documented in 1382. Before the Thirty Years' War, Chlumec was referred to as a market town. In 1474, the estate was acquired by the Lobkowicz family. They owned Chlumec until the establishment of an independent municipality in 1850. In that year, the name was changed to Vysoký Chlumec to distinguish it from other places with the same name. The castle was confiscated from the Lobkowicz family by the Nazis in World War II, then again by the state in 1948.

== Demographics ==
Historical population

Year	Pop.	±%
1869	1,524	—
1880	1,628	+6.8%
1890	1,585	−2.6%
1900	1,676	+5.7%
1910	1,571	−6.3%

Year	Pop.	±%
1921	1,411	−10.2%
1930	1,297	−8.1%
1950	952	−26.6%
1961	912	−4.2%
1970	841	−7.8%

Year	Pop.	±%
1980	812	−3.4%
1991	836	+3.0%
2001	789	−5.6%
2011	811	+2.8%
2021	795	−2.0%

Source: Censuses

== Economy ==
Vysoký Chlumec was known for the Vysoký Chlumec Brewery, part of the Pivovary Lobkowicz company. The brewing tradition goes back to at least 1466. The brewery closed in 2021 due to the COVID-19 pandemic, and since then Lobkowicz beers have been brewed elsewhere.

== Transport ==
There are no railways or major roads passing through the municipality.

== Sights ==
The main landmark of Vysoký Chlumec is the Vysoký Chlumec Castle, located on a hill above the market town. The medieval castle ceased to be an aristocratic seat in the early 17th century and began to decay. After the Thirty Years' War, it was partly rebuilt. Various modifications took place continuously until the 19th century, but the castle retained its medieval character. The castle was reconstructed in the 20th century and nowadays serves as a private residence.

In Vysoký Chlumec is an open-air museum, a subsidiary of the Mining Museum in Příbram. It presents examples of rural architecture from the mid-17th century to the beginning of the 20th century, typical for the region. The exhibits in the interiors show living and farming in the village.
