= Viktorin Kornel of Všehrdy =

Czech lawyer and writer (1460–1520)

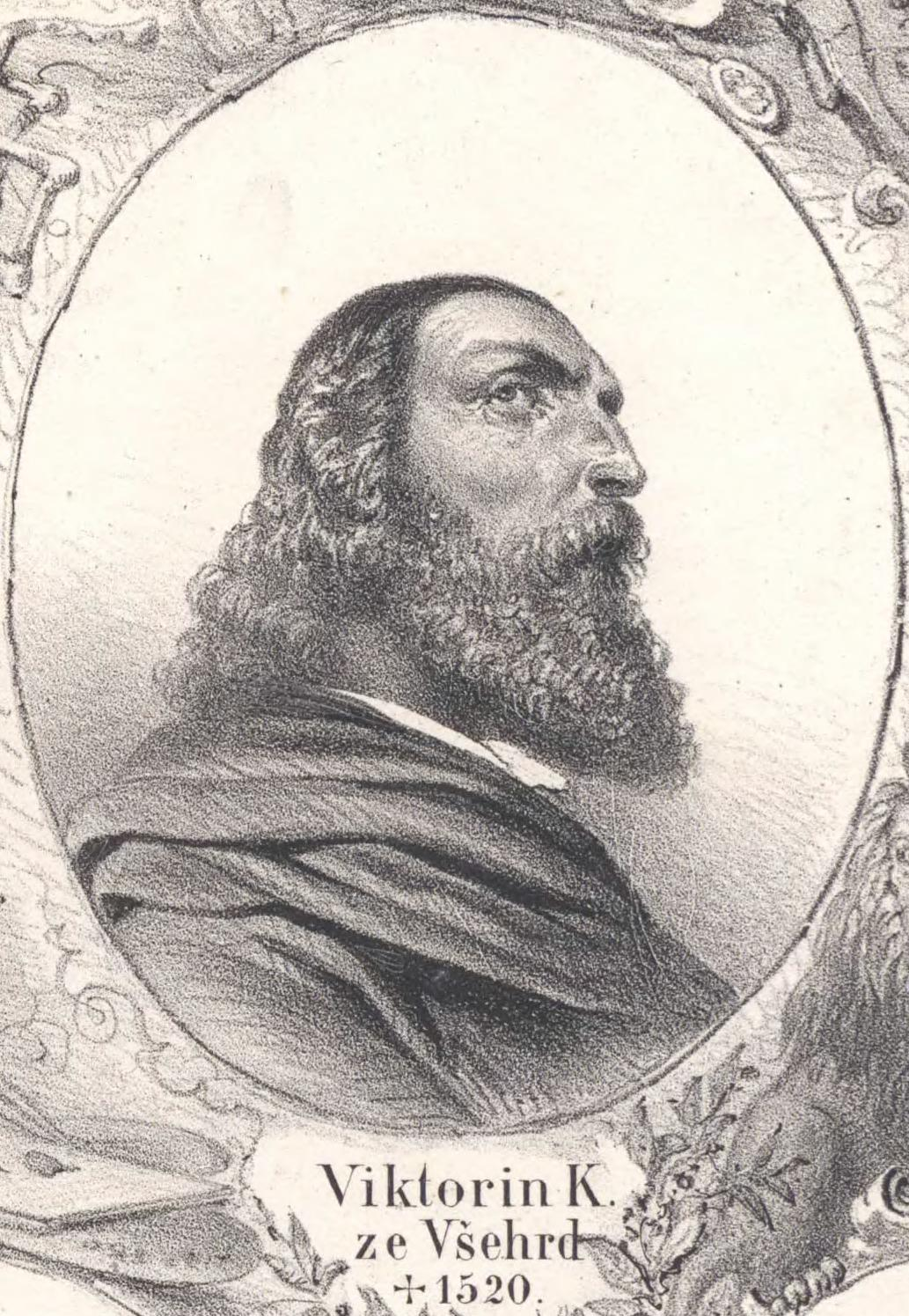
- Portrait Viktorin Kornel of Všehrdy from 1862

Personal details
- Born: 1460 Chrudim, Bohemia
- Died: 21 September 1520 (aged 59–60) Prague, Bohemia
- Resting place: Church of St. John the Baptist, Prague-Malá Strana
- Education: University of Prague)

Viktorin Kornel of Všehrdy (Czech: Viktorin Kornel ze Všehrd) or simply Všehrd (1460 – 21 September 1520), was a Czech humanist and lawyer, working towards the end of the 15th century as Vice-scribe at the Land Court in the Prague Castle. He is known for the most penetrating analysis of the Czech common law that he has put forward on some 460 pages under the title "On the Laws of the Czech Land Nine Books" („O právích země české knihy devatery"). He has also translated some Latin texts.

== Life ==
Viktorin Kornel was born in 1460 in the burgher Utraquist (moderate Hussite) environment of the East-Bohemian town of Chrudim. Having graduated from the Faculty of Arts of the then Utraquist University of Prague, Všehrd gained a wider outlook and capacities of generalization – preconditions for asking, reflecting on as well as answering a number of questions the previous authors of law books from the ranks of nobility had not arrived at.

After 1487 Všehrd held the Office of the Land Boards on the Prague Castle and from 1493 to 1497, during the vacant post of the scribe, he held the post of Vice-scribe at the Land Court in the Prague Castle. The Land Boards with rulings of the Land Court, which were to be burnt during the later great fire of Prague Castle in 1541, had decayed into a flimsy and bad state even before Všehrd's activities. Lawyers in the land routinely used the mere digests of rulings in the form of subject- or alphabetically ordered registers. These attitudes and Všehrd's recording of legal documents led to his dismissal from the Land Court in 1497. Nevertheless, in the course of his appointment he had managed to collect enough material to write his scholarly treatise. Having finished the treatise in 1501, he offered it to the public to be copied freely. He explicitly granted the results of his work for the defense of good and just people "so that they would be able to protect themselves against evil and wilful people." Having lost his position, Všehrd successfully carried on his legal and financial practice.

He died of plague on 21 September 1520. He is buried in the Church of St. John the Baptist in Prague-Malá Strana.

== Opus Magnum ==
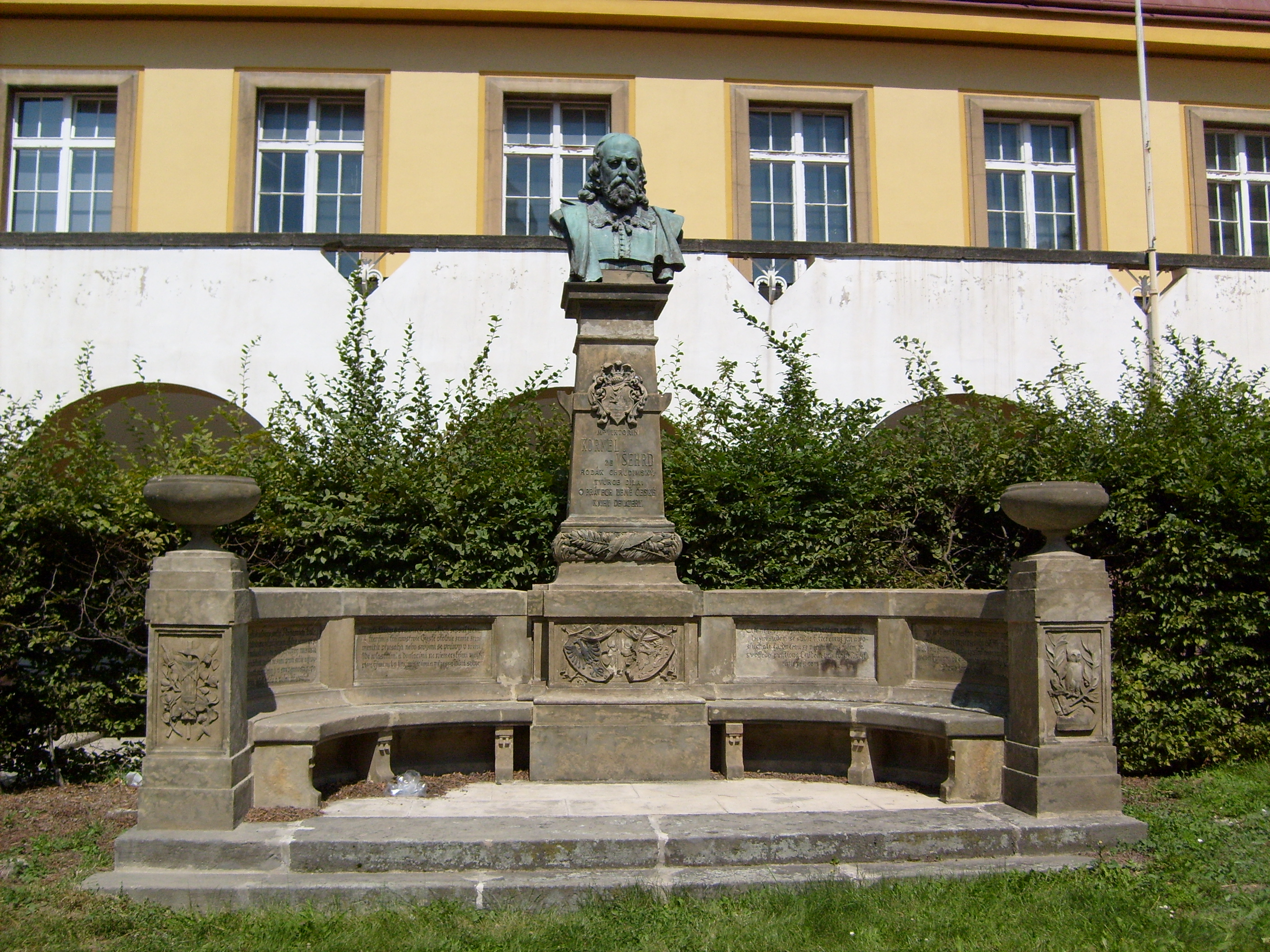
Memorial of Viktorin Kornel of Všehrdy in Chrudim, Czech Republic

=== Assets of Czech Common Law ===
If, today, legal systems of European origin are usually divided into civil law originated in the framework of late Roman positive law with codified written principles and the English common law, giving precedential authority to prior court decisions, the latter practices were in older times not quite exclusive for England. Such systems dominated in the historic lands of the Kingdom of Bohemia as late as the beginnings of the Modern Age, and even longer in the then Polish and Hungarian lands. Common law was abolished by Habsburg Emperor Ferdinand II only after the loss of national sovereignty in 1627 – some years after the fateful defeat in the Battle of White Mountain (1620).

In a spirit similar to some English lawyers Všehrd extolled irretrievability of legal customs in which the experiences of past ages had been condensed, as Všehrd put it, "from ancestors and old Czechs arduously and diligently found." Všehrd realized that the stability and force of customs and traditions in this way served as a guarantee of liberty and a mighty barrier against intentional misuse of the law by the powerful. He warned against the most "baneful" enemies – those who would abuse the laws, who would like to change, modify and turn over the very laws "by which the land has been standing from the time immemorial." The changes would mean "downfall of the good and in particular poor people, widows and orphans." "If the laws of the land work in their steadiness and invariability, the goings on for all people in general as well as for any person in particular are good. If the laws of the land change, the goings on are on the contrary bad for all as for any single individual." Through his comparison of the Czech Land Boards with the Roman Twelve Tables the open-minded and freedom-loving as well as conservative Všehrd implied that Czech law is of no lower value than Roman law. His moderate legal relativism does not exclude possibility of a partial inspiration from abroad. To adopt principles from foreign legal systems is admittedly possible, but usually not suitable: what works well in one legal system often does not prove its worth in another. It is more rewarding simply to learn from foreign experiences and their comparisons. The canon law of the Catholic Church had after the Hussite Wars almost disappeared from awareness of the Czech people, but some elements of the Roman law had found a way into native practice. Všehrd complained that the lawyers who had been educated at foreign universities were trying to practice at the Land Court the rules that had not been accepted by the native law. Moreover, he was not satisfied with protracted and therefore costly lawsuits held according to the Roman law.

=== Vice-Scribe as an Impartial Observer ===
Všehrd tried to set himself free from his own interests, to defend general interests and to adopt the outlook of an impartial observer. From this perspective he could make an opinion on the damages the short-term and selfish aims of certain individuals or social classes had brought about to the whole society. On the other hand, if it seemed obvious to him, Všehrd reminded individuals or groups that they were harming their own interests and themselves in a long-time span. He called on those who were advancing unjustifiably to make agreement and reconciliation with their adversary. An incessant effort is needed to keep the justice. "The useful does not differ from the fair, but "one is indissolubly tied up with the other" and "all the evils begin with, yield, grow and carry out from their separation." And Všehrd opposed the dictate of high nobility and its functional codification of the law. While the first three books of the work "On the Laws of the Czech Land Nine Books" deal roughly with what is nowadays called procedural law, the next three discuss substantive law to which a short supplement on execution is added. In the seventh book we find further and more detailed regulations on execution law. The eighth book deals with some publicly relevant legal documents and with administrative fees. Finally, the ninth book deals with confusions and inconsistencies in the application of law as well as with some reforms of legal order.

=== Columns of Power and Contract ===
With patent satisfaction, Všehrd understood the relationship between king and society in the Czech state as a social contract. The land itself elects the king, it is not purchased by him by any money and is subject to him only voluntarily: The king must make an oath to the land and is obliged to administer it "not as he would like to, but only along the age-old liberties and rights of the land." The civil servants should remember "that they are not masters, but only servants of all community and all the people; for they take from the people their money and fees for their profession which is, as they often hear, their plough." Even the Land Boards, let alone each office in general, is construed as service for the sake of all. Therefore, it is desirable that all "whose profession makes them to come to the Boards should be serving all people without shouting and discords about their needs, talking meekly as servants, not shouting as lords."

While John Locke tried to limit the executive power by the power legislative (and federative), Všehrd in his effort to maintain the balance of power did not count with any legislative assembly that would have legislative powers. The legal order of the land, in his understanding, had so far been and also should have been formed primarily and just by old customs and precedents. Only in special cases – as was the case of the then notorious Dalibor of Kozojedy who in 1496 had taken over the serfs and property of another squire – the judgment depended upon discretionary powers of judges. In addition to the king, equipped with some executive powers, the second Všehrd's column of power is so formed by the whole of old traditions, "liberties and rights" of the land itself. I.e. by assemblies (the Assembly or the Diet (Sněmovna) of the Land had until the 1620s the explicit power to choose and/or elect the king, to give consent to taxation and recruitment quotas), the above-mentioned legal order given primarily by the old customs and precedents, which should be transparent and familiar to the wider public, and finally by people's customs and habits in a wider sense. The contract between the land and the sovereign is in Všehrd obviously more equal than later in Thomas Hobbes' Leviathan; position of the land is stronger and the sovereign is weaker. Všehrd's sovereign is even not able, due to a lack of political power, to appoint his successors. Všehrd also appreciates peace, preferring negotiations to war, but unlike Hobbes, he almost does not use religious arguments. However, the Czech lands had by then already established religious toleration; in principle every single individual could choose their own religion by then. Even political groupings or proto-parties in the estates assemblies (after the 1485 Peace of Kutná Hora) used to be formed by different religious groups (and individual people could choose their confession in the Lands of the Czech Crown then).

=== Familiarity with Legal Customs ===
Všehrd tried to make especially lower and middle classes familiar with the law in order not to be neglected in their proceedings and needs. As many people as possible were to have a look into the law and operations of judiciary. Všehrd stressed equal inheritance rights for women, arguing by age-old foundation of native law. And in addition to that, he maintained, it is useful and entertaining to consider the laws of the land as it "is sharpening reason and hardening memory of those who often think about them." That is why Všehrd approved of the substitution of Latin by the "natural" Czech language at the Land Boards and elsewhere in the land's judiciary in 1495. And he refused the steps common in that period towards making law more opaque and its application more difficult (e.g. the use of paper instead of the previous use of more durable parchment for recordings of judicial rulings; new crossings that made the previous text illegible; the hindering of free access to the Land Boards that had been accessible before to every single individual; or entries into the Land Boards without the respective parties being present, or even notified). So with his own overheads, Všehrd was in his leisure time and to his own disadvantage, helping people by enabling them to take care of themselves.

== Influence ==
Thanks to the Hussite reform movement Czech language was introduced to the official and legal agenda (and the Czech example strengthened the position of some other national languages in surrounding countries, especially Hungarian and rather indirectly also Romanian). Všehrd turned to his native language and was among initiators of the tradition of Czech national and reformational humanism. Later, he parted company with his friend, the noble and Catholic poet Bohuslav Hasištejnský z Lobkovic (of Lobkovice), who wrote in Latin.

Všehrd's work has survived Baroque period called by many a 'period of darkness' (that at least in political and intellectual sense in the Czech lands) in handwritten copies. During the period of the National Revival in the 19th century the work served a role in the process of re-creation of the Czech legal terminology. The first book edition in 1841 was considerably curtailed by the Austrian Metternichian censorship, that was not satisfied even with those compromises Všehrd had had to make some 340 years earlier. The second and the till-date last edition, that was published in 1874, is nowadays almost out of reach.

Všehrd's name was in 1868 taken over by Czech law students. Their organization, "Všehrd Association of Czech Lawyers", renewed after "1989 Velvet Revolution" in Czechoslovakia, has been working up to now.

== Literature ==
- M. Viktorina ze Všehrd – O právích země české knihy devatery; vydání nové, kteréž upravil a přídavky opatřil Dr. Hermenegild Jireček, v Praze nákladem spolku českých právníků „Všehrd" 1874; Book digitized by Google from the library of Oxford University and uploaded to the Internet Archive by user tpb.
- Routledge Encyclopedia of Philosophy, Volume 2, Heading: Czech Republic, Philosophy in, Josef Zumr (p. 763-769), p. 765:
- Czech quotations from Všehrd's work can be found in the article Zdeněk Zacpal - Viktorin Kornelius ze Všehrd: Užitečné se neliší od slušného (2012)
- Sir William Blackstone – Commentaries on the Laws of England, Volume I, Containing Books of I and II, Edited by William Carey Jones, Edition de Luxe, Bancroft-Whitney Company, San Francisco, 1916 [the lectures got its form in 1753-1765]
- Euan Cameron – Dissent and Heresy (p. 3-21); in: A Companion to the Reformation World, Edited by R. Po-chia Hsia (Blackwell Companions to European History), Blackwell Publishing Ltd (2004).
- Kolektiv pod vedením Petra Čorneje – Kdy, kde, proč & jak se to stalo v českých dějinách, Praha, Reader's Digest Výběr, Praha, 2001, ISBN 80-86196-33-X
- Zdeněk David – Finding the Middle Way: The Utraquists' Liberal Challenge to Rome and Luther, Washington, DC: Woodrow Wilson Center Press, and Baltimore: Johns Hopkins University Press, 2003. Pp. 579.
- J. Goll – Chelčický a Jednota Bratrská v XV. století, Historický klub Klementinum, Praha, 1916
- Rick Fawn, Jiří Hochman – Historical Dictionary of the Czech State, Scarecrow Press, Plymouth, 2010, UK, ISBN 978-0-8108-5648-6
- Thomas Hobbes – Leviathan; Revised Student Edition, Edited by Richard Tuck, Cambridge Texts in the History of Political Thought, Cambridge University Press (1996) 2000, ISBN 0 521 39492 9 hardback
- Petr Hora - Toulky českou minulostí III, Baronet, ISBN 80-7214-091-4, Praha, 1998
- Jiří Kejř – Husité, Panorama, Praha, 1984
- Jan Amos Komenský [Comenius] – Historie o těžkých protivenstvích církve české [1632]
- Michael Lobban – A History of the Philosophy of Law in the Common Law World, 1600–1900, Springer, Dordrecht, The Netherlands, 2007
- John Locke – Second Treatise of Government, Edited, with an Introduction, by C. B. Macpherson, Hackett Publishing Company, Inc., Indianapolis, IN, 1980, ISBN 0-915144-86-7 (pbk.)
- Karel Malý – Obyčej – nález – zákon v právu doby předbělohorské, Právnická fakulta Trnavskej univerzity v Trnave (Slovakia), 2009
- R. Polin – La force et son emploi dans la politique de Hobbes (p. 3-22); in:
- Thomas Hobbes – Critical Assessments, Edited by Preston King, Volume III – Politics and Law, Routledge, London and New York, 1993, ISBN 0-415-08083-5
- Právněhistorické studie VII se souborem prací k 500. výročí narození M. Viktorina Cornelia ze Všehrd, Nakladatelství Československé akademie věd, Praha 1961:
  - p. 53-57: Václav Vaněček - Historická role právnického díla mistra Viktorina Cornelia ze Všehrd
  - p. 59-76: J. B. Čapek – Místo Všehrdovo ve vývoji českého an evropského humanismu
  - p. 77-129: František Čáda – Všehrdovo právnické dílo v dochovaných rukopisech
  - p. 131-146: Jiří Veselý – Všehrd při práci (K otázce pramenů Všehrdova díla)
  - p. 147-199: Miroslav Boháček – Římské a kanonické právo v díle Všehrdově
  - p. 201-231: Jiří Klabouch – Všehrdovy teoretické představy o právu a jeho sociálně politická stanoviska
  - p. 257-273: Valentin Urfus – Všehrdovo pojetí majetkoprávních vztahů zemského práva českého
- Routledge Encyclopedia of Philosophy - Volume 2 (1998), ISBN 0415187079, ISBN 978-0415187077 Heading: Czech Republic, Philosophy in, Josef Zumr (p. 763-769)
- Karel Schelle – Právní dějiny, Aleš Čeněk, s.r.o., Plzeň, 2007, ISBN 978-80-7380-043-7
