= Ferdinand Maria von Lobkowicz =

Austrian Catholic bishop (1726–1795)

- Bishop of Ghent
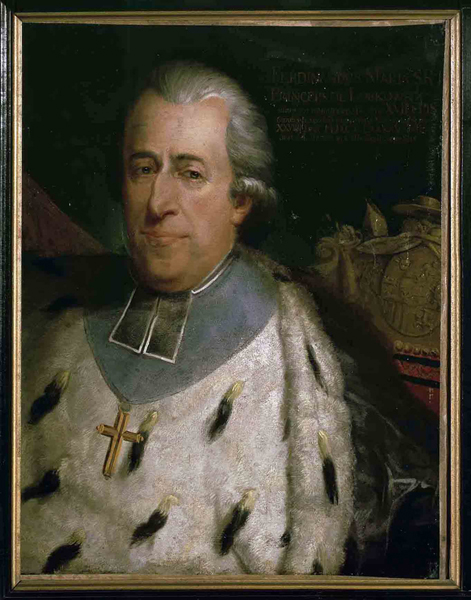
- Portrait of Bishop Lobkowicz in Saint Bavo's Cathedral, Ghent
- Church: Catholic Church
- Diocese: Diocese of Ghent
- In office: 20 September 1779 – 29 January 1795
- Predecessor: Govaart Geeraard van Eersel
- Successor: Étienne André François de Paule de Fallot de Beaumont de Beaupré
- Previous post: Bishop of Namur (1772-1779)

Orders
- Ordination: 21 January 1751
- Consecration: 10 May 1772 by József Batthyány

Personal details
- Born: 18 December 1726 Vienna, Archduchy of Austria, Austrian Circle, Holy Roman Empire
- Died: 29 January 1795 (aged 68) Münster, Prince-Bishopric of Münster, Lower Rhenish–Westphalian Circle, Holy Roman Empire

Ferdinandus Maria Carolus Josephus Leonardus Procopius prins van Lobkowicz (Vienna, 18 December 1726 – Münster, 29 January 1795) was a Catholic priest and 15th Bishop of Namur (1772–1779) and 17th Bishop of Ghent (1779–1795).

== Life ==
His parents were Austrian Field Marshal and Governor of Sicily, Johann Georg Christian, Prince of Lobkowicz and his wife Karoline Henriette von Waldstein. His great-grandfather was the second Prince of Lobkowitz, Wenzel Eusebius von Lobkowicz.

On 21 January 1751, Ferdinand Maria von Lobkowitz was ordained a priest and subsequently served as vicar in Salzburg and canon in Liège and Augsburg.

Pope Clement XIV appointed him Bishop of Namur on 30 January 1772. He was ordained bishop on 10 May of the same year. On 20 September 1779, Pope Pius VI appointed him Bishop of Ghent. His motto was Ad haerere Deus bonum ("It is good to attach oneself to God").

On 23 June 1794, the Bishop fled from the approaching French revolutionaries, via Antwerp, Düsseldorf and Delft to Münster, where he arrived ill, and died on 29 January 1795 at the age of 68. He was buried in the Münster Cathedral.

The French abolished the Bishopric of Ghent. A successor was not appointed until 1802, after the restoration of Catholic worship.
