= William Lobkowicz =

Bohemian noble (born 1961)

- Prince of Lobkowicz (by tradition)
- Known for: Restoration of House of Lobkowicz properties
- Born: September 7, 1961 (age 64); Boston, Massachusetts, U.S.
- Residence: Prague, Czech Republic
- Noble family: House of Lobkowicz
- Spouse: Alexandra Florescu (m. 1989)
- Issue: 3 (including William Rudolf Lobkowicz)
- Parents: Martin Lobkowicz (father); Margaret Juett (mother)
- Occupation: Businessman, preservationist

William Lobkowicz (born 7 September 1961) is a Czech-American nobleman who currently serves as Founder and Chairman of the House of Lobkowicz. Born in Boston, Massachusetts, Lobkowicz moved to Czechoslovakia in 1991 to join his parents in restoring the family's properties and art collections, which had been seized by the Soviet Union.

== Family and youth ==
William is the fourth child of Martin Lobkowicz and Margaret Juett. He first visited Czechoslovakia in 1976 at age 14. He attended Milton Academy for high school and graduated from Harvard University in 1984, where he studied European history and music. After graduating, Lobkowicz worked in banking and real estate.

Although some junior members of the House of Lobkowicz are entitled to the prefix of "Prince" and the style of Serene Highness, William does not use the title.

== Personal life ==
He married Alexandra Florescu (b. 1963), daughter of historian Radu Florescu, who belongs to one of Romania's oldest noble families, Florescu family. They have 3 children together:

- Prince William Rudolf (b.1994)
- Princess Ileana (b. 1997)
- Princess Sophia (b. 2001)

== Restoration of property ==
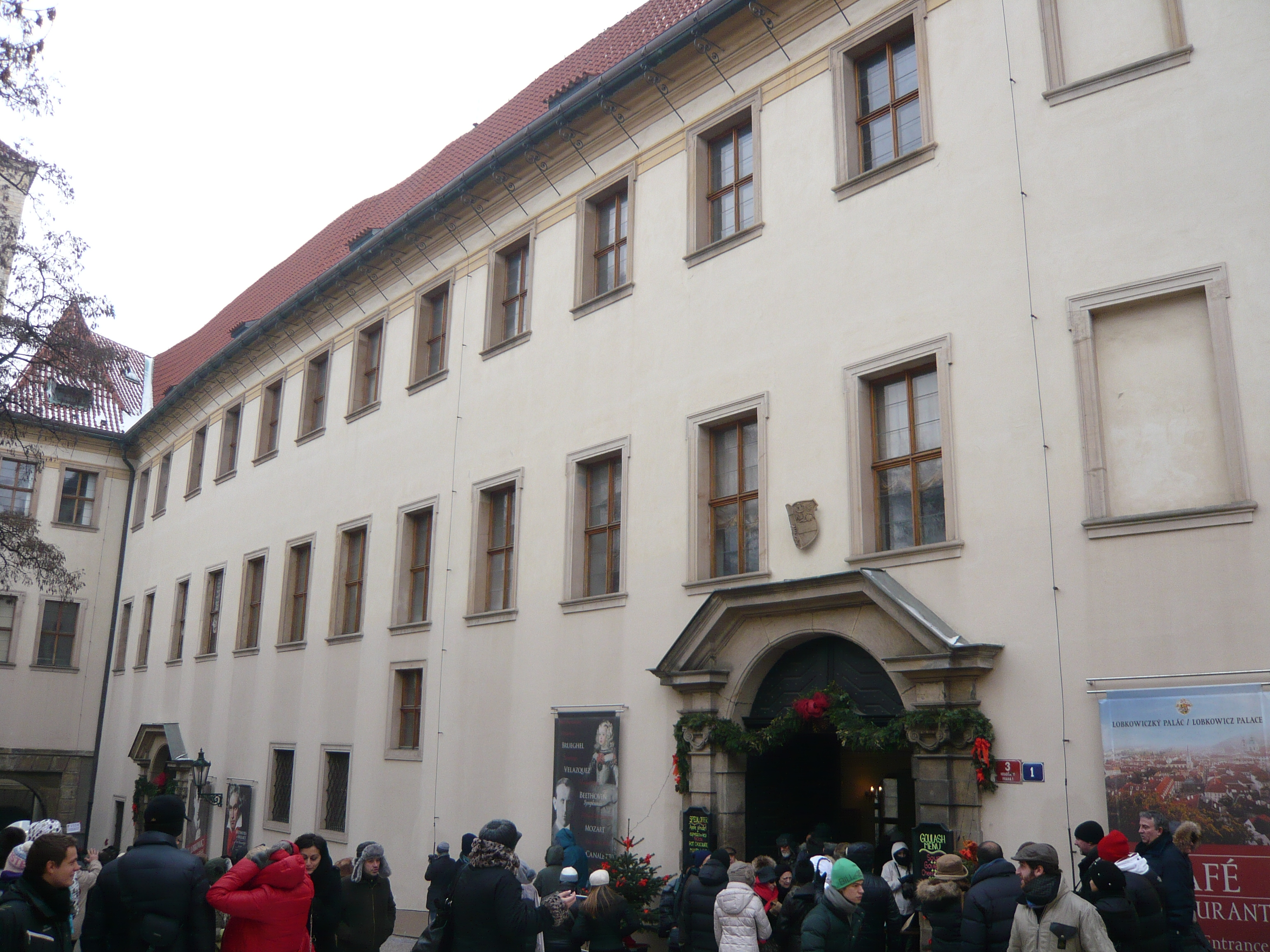
Facade of the Lobkowicz Palace (situated in the eastern part of the Prague Castle area)

Shortly after the fall of the Communist government in Czechoslovakia at the end of 1989, William Lobkowicz moved to the country of his ancestors to claim the family's former lands and castles. Lobkowicz's initial work focused on having the property legally restored to the family, a project which took much money and time.

Lobkowicz has since focused on the restoration, maintenance, and upkeep of the castles now under his ownership. Of the more than ten castles and palaces once possessed by the House of Lobkowicz, William Lobkowicz now oversees four of them, including the ancestral Lobkowicz Palace (formerly Pernštejn Palace) at Prague Castle Complex, with some of the remainder having been sold off to finance the restoration as well as long-term maintenance of the other four. Additional financing has been obtained by converting some of the family properties to hotels and restaurants. The Lobkowicz Palace includes a restaurant, and guided English-speaking tours are offered.

=== Lobkowicz Palace at Prague Castle ===
One of two existing Lobkowicz palaces in Prague (the other Lobkovický palác being the seat of the German Embassy), the building restored to William Lobkowicz is situated at the utmost wing of the vast area of Prague Castle on the Hradčany Hill.

The Lobkowicz Palace exhibition includes original manuscripts of Wolfgang Amadeus Mozart and Ludwig van Beethoven compositions. The most valuable manuscript in the collection is the original score of Beethoven's Opus 55, Symphony No. 3 in E-flat major (Eroica), composed in 1803/04. Beethoven had originally conceived of dedicating the symphony to Napoleon Bonaparte, but this would have deprived him of a fee that he would receive if he instead dedicated the symphony to Prince Joseph Franz Maximilian Lobkowicz. This Lobkowicz ancestor was also the dedicatee of some other great works, including Joseph Haydn's "Lobkowitz" quartets (Opus 77), and Beethoven's 5th and 6th symphonies, as well as his Opus 18 string quartets.

Further, the exhibition shows, i.a., The Hay Harvest painting by Pieter Bruegel the Elder (also known as Haymaking), one of five remaining landscape paintings belonging to The Months cycle. This work depicts the period of June–July and was created by the artist in 1565. In a frescoed hall of the palace, concerts of classical music are frequently given.
