= Maiestas Carolina =

1350 proposed legal code in Bohemia

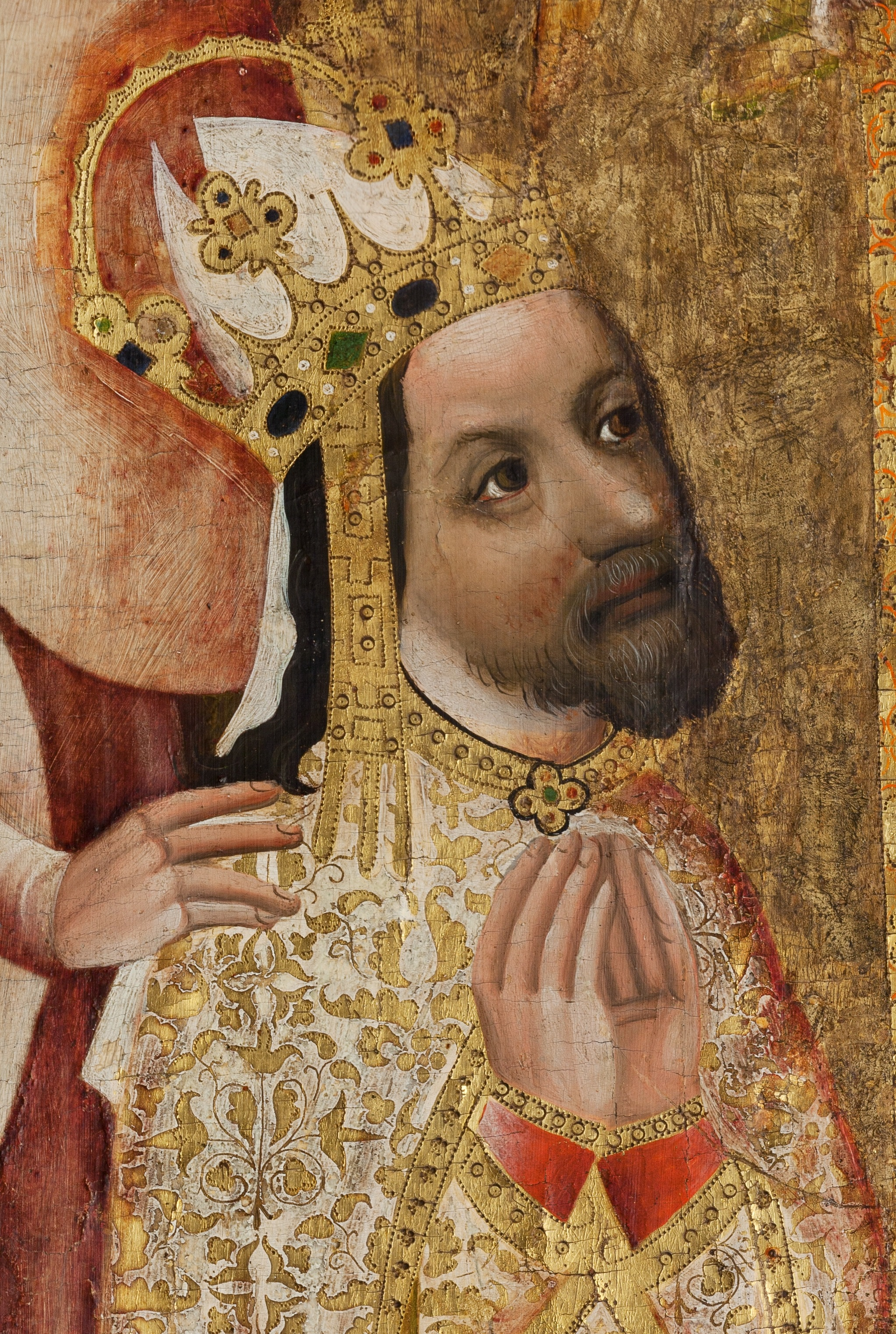
Charles IV., the Holy Roman Emperor

The Maiestas Carolina was a legal code proposed by Charles IV., Holy Roman Emperor in 1350 to govern Bohemia. It received its name not before 1617.

Based on previous legal customs and the Liber Augustalis of 1231, the aim of the code was to increase royal power. Included among its provisions were sections granting the right to judge criminal cases solely to the king and others allowing the king greater control over functionaries in order to increase royal revenues. The code also contained sections regarding forest conservation. The nobility, however, demanded to act as had always been the custom; they did not want to be bound by any written law.

With this code, which contained 109 articles, Charles IV intended to secure the royal property - defining 29 royal towns and 13 castles, that could not be pledged, another 13 towns and 14 castles could be pledged for a maximum of nine years.

The Bohemian Diet resented the loss of their own power and opposed the code. In 1355, the nobility finally rejected the code at the General Assembly, which was the end of Charles's hopes for its publication. Charles withdrew the code in 1355, and it never came into effect. But to save face, he said that the manuscript had been accidentally destroyed - burned.

In connection with Maiestas Carolina, the Ordo iudicii terrae (In Czech Řád práva zemského), a legal book, was created in the 14th century.

The text and the Czech translation were published by František Palacký in 1844 as part of the third volume of the Czech Archive.

== Bibliography ==
- edited by František Palacký, in: Archiv český 3 (1844), p. 65-180.
