= Schetz =

German Noble House

(von) Schetzenberg Schetz de Grobbendonck
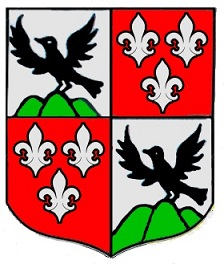
- Country: Spanish Netherlands Austrian Netherlands
- Titles: Lords of Wezenmael; Lords of Usbach; Barons of Hoboken; Counts of Grobbendoncq
- Cadet branches: Schetz de Grobbendoncq (+)

The House of Schetz or Schetz de Grobbendonk, originally House von Schetzenberg is a German Noble House. Most famous is the Flemish branch named Schetz, one of whose members became the first duke of Ursel.

== Origins ==
It is believed that the origin of this family was in 13th-century Franconia, deriving from Schetzenberg or Schetzenberge. It is thought that Werner von Schetzenberge (died 1273), Herr von Polant und Schezsenberge, was one of the founders.

The family moved to the Netherlands where Erasmus of Schetzenberg bought the lordship of Grobbendonk. In 1548 they were created Baron of Gobbendonk, and in 1637, by Philip IV of Spain, Count of Grobbendonk.

== Wealth ==
Because of the economic importance of this family, many historians have researched the origin of their wealth. It is believed that Claes van Rechtergem, the father in law of Erasmus II, started the economic traffic with Italy. Continued by his son-in-law, who moved to Antwerp, their commercial empire became so important that the family controlled a large part of copper production in Aachen and the sugar traffic from Brazil. He became so wealthy that he was on personal terms with the Emperor, and his sons Bathasar, Melchior and Caspar became the most popular heirs of Antwerp. They easily married into the nobility and founded the dynasty of the House of Ursel.

Marriages to the Houses of Ursel, Van Straelen en Rockox guaranteed the house considerable political power in Antwerp. Melchior was responsible for the city treasury. The youngest of the brothers paid the bill at the end. When trade declined, he was left with a debt of 750.000 Florins.

The family has been Catholic for hundreds of years.

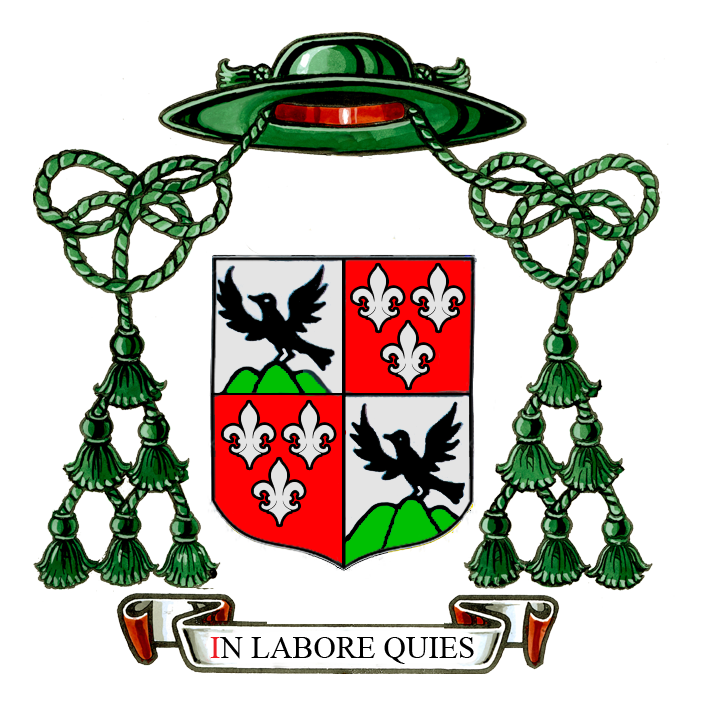
Coat of Arms

coat of arms of the duke of Ursel

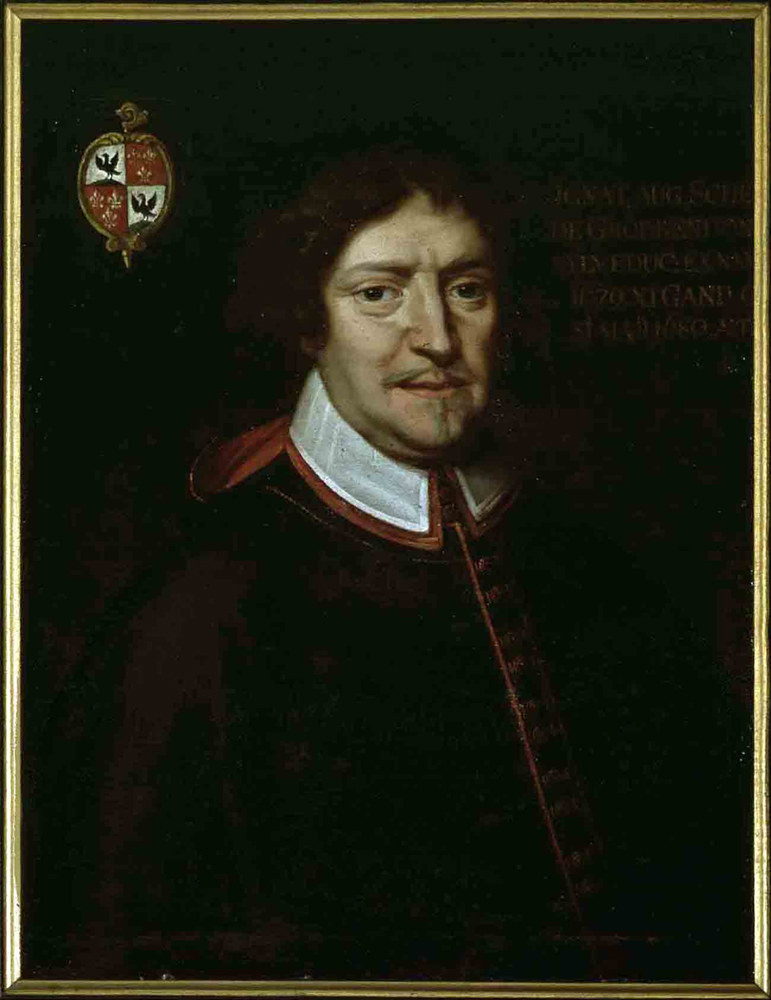
Mosignor Schetz de Grobbendonck, bishop of Ghent, with his crest.

=== Herren von Schetzenberg ===
Everard, Herr von Schetzenbergh,
married to Sofia von Leynach.

  1. Bernard, Ritter von Schetzenbergh,
    married to Catharina von Grondstein.
    1. Conrad von Schetzenbergh,
      married to Wilhelmine Sindernich.
    2. Robert von Schetz, natus 1349,
      married to Gerardine Schintard.
      1. Erasmus I Schetz,
        married to Catharine de Treglin.
        1. Conrad I Schetz,
          married to Maria Crans di Roscara.
          1. Gaspard I Schetz,
          2. Erasmus II Schetz, died 1550: Lord of Usbach and Grobbendonk;
            married to Catherin de Cock van Opinen.
          3. Balthazar II Schetz, Lord of Hoboken, marr. Margharethe van Straelen.
            1. Erasmus III Schetz, alderman of Antwerp, Marr. Maria of Gemert.
            2. Anthony I Schetz
            3. Maria Schetz, Lady of Eechoven.
        2. Gerard Schetz, Lord of Terwyer.

=== Lords of Grobbendoncq ===
Erasmus II Schetz, died 1550: Lord of Usbach and Grobbendonk,
married to Catherin de Cock van Opinen.

  1. Gaspard II Schetz, died 1580: Lord of Hoboken, Grobbendonk and Hinghene, married to Catharina d'Ursel, daughter of Lancelot II of Ursel.
    1. Lancelot I Schetz, (1550-1619)
    2. Nicholas Melchior Schetz,(1551-1626) : Baron of Wesemael, Lord of Heyst, married to Maria of Marnix, daughter of Jacques de Marnix, Lord of Toulouse.
    3. Ursula Schetz, lady of Hoensbroeck, (1554-1622)
    4. Lucrecetia Schetz, died 1627.
    5. Catharine Schetz, baroness of Ribaucourt, (1555-1607): Married 1576 to Charles d´Aubermont, Lord of Ribaucourt, died 1621.
      1. Gaspard Antoine d'Aubremont, Lord of Ribaucourt and Grimberghe: Married Marie Lamberta d'Enghien.
        1. Maria Margherete d'Aubremont, marr. Don Diego Gomez, Count of Espinosa.
    6. Anthonie II Schetz, (1564-1640): 1st Count of Grobbendonk (1637), Order of Santiago, Married in 1604 to Maria van Malsen, Lady of Tilburg.
  2. Balthasar I Schetz, (1520-1586)
  3. Conrad II Schetz,
    married to Maria of Brimeu.
    1. Julianne Schetz,
      married to Robert I Tucher
  4. Melchior II Schetz(1516-1577): treasurer of Antwerp, Lord of Rumst, married to Joanna van Straelen.
    1. Anna Schetz, marr. Charles van de Werve, died 1604.
      1. Guilliam van de Werve, died 1639: Lord of Schilde. Marr. Anne van de Werve.
  5. Balthazar II Schetz, Lord of Hoboken, marr. Margharethe van Straelen.

=== Lords of Hoboken ===
Gaspard II Schetz

  1. Conrad III Schetz, (1553–1632), later Conrad of Ursel:
    created 1st Baron of Hoboken, ambassador to England.
    Married to Françoise Richardot.
    1. Conrad, 1st Count of Ursel, (1592-1659): 2nd Baron of Hoboken:
      married to Anne Maria de Robles.
      1. François, 2nd Count of Ursel (1626-1696): 3rd Baron of Hoboken
        married to Honorine Maria Dorothea van Hornes.
        1. Conrard-Albert, 1st Duke d'Ursel, (1663-1738): 1st Duke of Ursel and 1st Duke of Hoboken. Married to Princess Eleonore von Salm, 1st Duchess of Ursel.
  2. Anthonie II Schetz: 1st Count of Grobbendonk.

=== Counts of Grobbendoncq ===
Anthonie II Schetz, 1st Count of Grobbendonk; Order of Santiago,
Married in 1604 to Maria van Malsen, Lady of Tilburg.

  1. Lancelot II Schetz, 2nd Count of Grobbendonk, Baron of Wesemael,
    married to Marguerite-Claire de Noyelles.
    1. Charles Hubert Auguste Schetz, 3rd Count of Grobbendonk, Baron of Wesemael.
    2. Anthony III Ignace Schetz, 4th Count of Grobbendonk,
      married to Maria Caroline de Berghes.
  2. Ignace Schetz de Grobbendonk, 11th Bishop of Ghent (1679–1680).

== See ==
- Ursel family
- Lord of Grobbendonk
- Engenho dos Erasmos
- Isabelle-Claire-Eugénie Schetz (died 1709), who would become abbess of La Cambre.

== Books ==
- Baudouin count d’URSEL, Les Schetz. La Maison de Grobbendonk, Bruxelles, 2004, 430 p. (Recueil de l'Office Généalogique et Héraldique de Belgique, LIV)
- Les Schetz. La Maison d’Ursel, Bruxelles, 2004, 524 p. (Recueil de l'Office Généalogique et Héraldique de Belgique, LV).
