= Hereditary Marshal of Brabant =

The Marshal of Brabant (erfmaarschalk van Brabant/ maréchal-héreditaire de Brabant) is a hereditary royal officeholder and chivalric title at the Court of Brabant.

== History ==
During war the Marshal was responsible for the safekeeping of abbeys and citizens, who could become victims during the fights. In the late Middle Ages the Marshall took part in peace treaties. During the ceremonial he was present together with the council of war. In 1160 the Lords of Wesemael had the privilege of this ceremonial office.

== List of Marshals of Brabant ==
=== House of Wesemael ===
Coat of Jean of Wesemael, Marshall of Brabant

Arnold I, Lord of Wesemael, Marshall of Brabant.

  - Arnold II, Lord of Wesemael and Westerloo, Marshall of Brabant
    - Arnold III, Lord of Wesemael and Westerloo, Marshall of Brabant
    - Godefrey, Lord of Wesemael, Marshall of Brabant
      - Arnold IV, Lord of Wesemael, Marshall of Brabant
        - Arnold V, Lord of Wesemael, Marshall of Brabant
        - Guillaume I, Lord of Wesemael, Marshall of Brabant,
          married to Joanne of Falais.
          - Guillaume II, Lord of Wesemael, Marshall of Brabant. Dies without heirs
          - Jean I, Lord of Wesemael, Marshall of Brabant,
            married to Ida, Lady of Ranst
            - Jean II, Lord of Wesemael, Marshall of Brabant; died without heirs.

=== House of Brimeu ===
Jean of Croÿ, Lord of Roeulx gifted the dominium of Wesemael to Guy of Brimeu in 1471

Guy of Brimeu, Lord of Meghen and Humbercourt; Marshall of Brabant.

  - Adrian of Brimeu, 1st Count of Meghen; Marshall of Brabant: died in the Battle of Marignan, 1515.
  - Eustache of Brimeu, 2nd Count of Meghem; Marshall of Brabant
    - Charles de Brimeu; Marshall of Brabant

=== House of Schetz ===
Gaspard II Schetz acquired the dominium of Wezemael from Charles de Brimeu.

  - Lancelot I Schetz; Marshall of Brabant dies without heirs.
  - Anthonie II Schetz.
    - Lancelot II Schetz; Marshall of Brabant
      - Anthony III Ignace Schetz; Marshall of Brabant
