= Anthonie II Schetz =

Anthonie II Schetz 1st Count of Grobbendonk
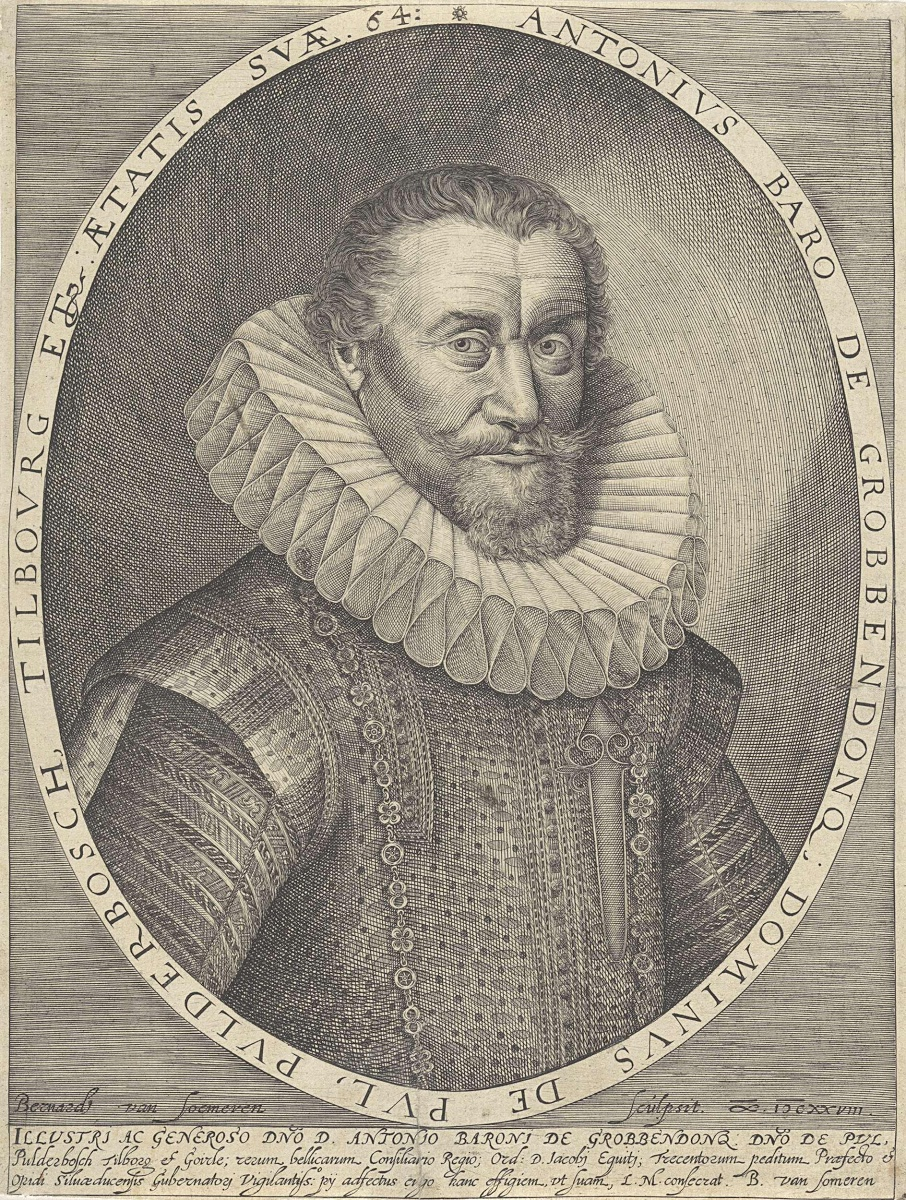
- Antonie II Schetz Count of Grobbendonk (1564-1641) at the age of 64.
- Born: Around 1564; Antwerp
- Died: 1640/41; Brussels
- Spouse(s): (1) Barbara Karremans (2) Maria van Malsen
- Relatives: Conrad III Schetz (brother); Lancelot II Schetz (son)
- Military career
- Allegiance: Spain
- Branch: Army of Flanders
- Commands: Governor of 's-Hertogenbosch (1589–1629); Governor of Leuven (1635)
- Conflicts: Eighty Years' War; Siege of 's-Hertogenbosch (1601); Siege of 's-Hertogenbosch (1629); Siege of Leuven (1635)

Anthonie Schetz (1564, Antwerp - 1640 or 1641, Brussels), was a Flemish military commander in Spanish service during the Eighty Years' War. He was baron (and from 1637 count) of Grobbendonk, lord of Tilburg and Goirle, Pulle, and Pulderbos, and Wezemaal. He was the military governor of 's-Hertogenbosch until the town was lost to the Dutch in 1629, captain of a cavalry regiment, and a knight of the order of Santiago.

== Life ==
=== Early life ===
The youngest son of Gaspard II Schetz and Catharina d'Ursel, of the noble Ursel family, and the younger brother of Conrad III Schetz, Anthonie was baptised in Antwerp in August 1564. His parents had 21 children in total, eight of whom survived to adulthood. His father was from the Schetzenbergh family, a German patrician family from Schmalkalden, and was the chief banker in Antwerp, financing several merchants who traded to Russia and Brazil, including his own brothers Melchior and Balthazar. Gaspar was also banker to Philip II of Spain, giving him a political role and making him a leading figure in the Antwerp of the second half of the 16th century.

In 1637 Baron Schetz was created 1st Count of Grobbendonck.

=== Marriages ===
In 1582 Anthonie married Barbara Karremans and after her early and childless death in 1604 he remarried to Maria van Malsen, daughter of Hubert van Malsen and heiress of Tilburg, a lordship in Goirle that through her father Hubert had been made allodial by paying the asking price of 8,000 guilders to outbid a previous lord from the related Van Haestrecht family – a century earlier it had been loaned to Joanna, Duchess of Brabant. This marriage made Antonie lord of Tilburg and Goirlie and after 1629, when 's-Hertogenbosch was handed over to the Dutch Republic, Schetz recognised the Republic as their owner and overlord.

Schetz and his second wife had seven children:

1. Lancelot, 2nd Count of Grobbendonck, and later governor of Limburg, who would marry Marguerite-Claire de Noyelles
2. Marie-Florence, who would marry Charles de Cottrel, Baron of Bois-de-Lessine
3. Agnes-Robertine, who would marry Jacques de Cottrel, Baron of Bois-de-Lessine, younger brother of her sister's husband Charles
4. Charlotte, who would marry Frederick de Gulpen, lord of Waudemont
5. Jeanne-Marie, who would marry Alard-Florent de Ruville, hereditary marshal of Luxemburg
6. Godefroid
7. Isabelle-Claire-Eugénie Schetz (died 1709), who would become abbess of La Cambre.
8. Ignace Schetz de Grobbendonk (1625–1680), 11th Bishop of Ghent

=== 's-Hertogenbosch ===
As a Catholic, Schetz joined the Catholic side and by 1589 was governor of 's-Hertogenbosch. Under his leadership the city fought off two attempts at capture by Maurice of Nassau, in 1601 and 1603.

=== Leuven ===
He is best remembered for his command of the Spanish army's successful defence of Leuven against a Franco-Dutch siege in 1635.

== Ancestors ==
Ancestors of Anthonie II Schetz

8. Conrad I Schetz
4. Erasmus II Schetz
9. Maria Krantz
2. Gaspard II Schetz, Lord of Grobbendonk
5. Catherin de Cock van Opinen
1. Anthonie II Schetz, Count of Grobbendonk
6. Lancelot van Ursel
3. Catharina van Ursel
7. Barbara van Lier-Immerseel

== Notes and references ==
Anthonie II Schetz House of Schetz
| Preceded by Lancelot I Schetz | Hereditary Marshall of Brabant –1641 | Succeeded by Lancelot II Schetz |
Belgian nobility
| Preceded by Gaspard II Schetz | 1st Count of Grobbendoncq –1641 | Succeeded by Lancelot II Schetz |
