= Siege of 's-Hertogenbosch (disambiguation) =

The siege of 's-Hertogenbosch or assault on 's-Hertogenbosch may refer to:

- Siege of 's-Hertogenbosch (1591) by Dutch rebel general Maurice of Nassau
- Siege of 's-Hertogenbosch (1601) by Maurice of Nassau
- Siege of 's-Hertogenbosch (1629) by Dutch rebel general Frederick Henry of Orange
