= Lancelot II Schetz =

Lancelot II Schetz (1604-1664), 2nd Count of Grobbendonk, baron of Wezemaal, lord of Durbuy, Tilburg, etc., was a Netherlandish nobleman and a military commander during the later stages of the Eighty Years' War.

Schetz was the eldest son and heir of the celebrated commander Anthonie Schetz. In 1638 he held the rank of colonel and was military governor of Saint-Omer when the town was besieged by the French.

Lancelot inherited his father's titles as count of Grobbendonk and baron of Wezemaal in 1641, and his mother's title to the lordship of Tilburg in 1650. He was lord of Durbuy through his marriage to Marguerite-Claire de Noyelles.

He would later become governor of the Duchy of Limburg. He died in 1664.

== Children ==
- Charles Hubert Auguste Schetz, died 1672: died in the Franco-Dutch War during the Battle of Kruipin, Woerden.
- Anthony III Ignace Schetz, died 1726: married to Marie Madeleine de Berghes, daughter of Eugene de Berghes, 2nd Count of Grimberghen.

Lancelot II Schetz House of Schetz Died: 1664
Preceded by Anthonie II Schetz	Hereditary Marshall of Brabant; 1641–1664	Succeeded by Anthony III Ignace Schetz
Preceded by Jan van Wiltz	Governor of Limburg; 1649–1664	Succeeded by John Francis Desideratus, Prince of Nassau-Siegen
Belgian nobility
Preceded by Anthonie II Schetz	2nd Count of Grobbendoncq; 1641–1664	Succeeded by Conrad III Schetz
Preceded by Marie of Malsen	Lord of Tilburg; 1660–1664	Succeeded by Conrad III Schetz
Preceded by Hugues, 1st Count of Noyelles	Lord of Durbuy –1664	Succeeded by Conrad III Schetz
