= Gaspard II Schetz =

Lord of Grobbendonk

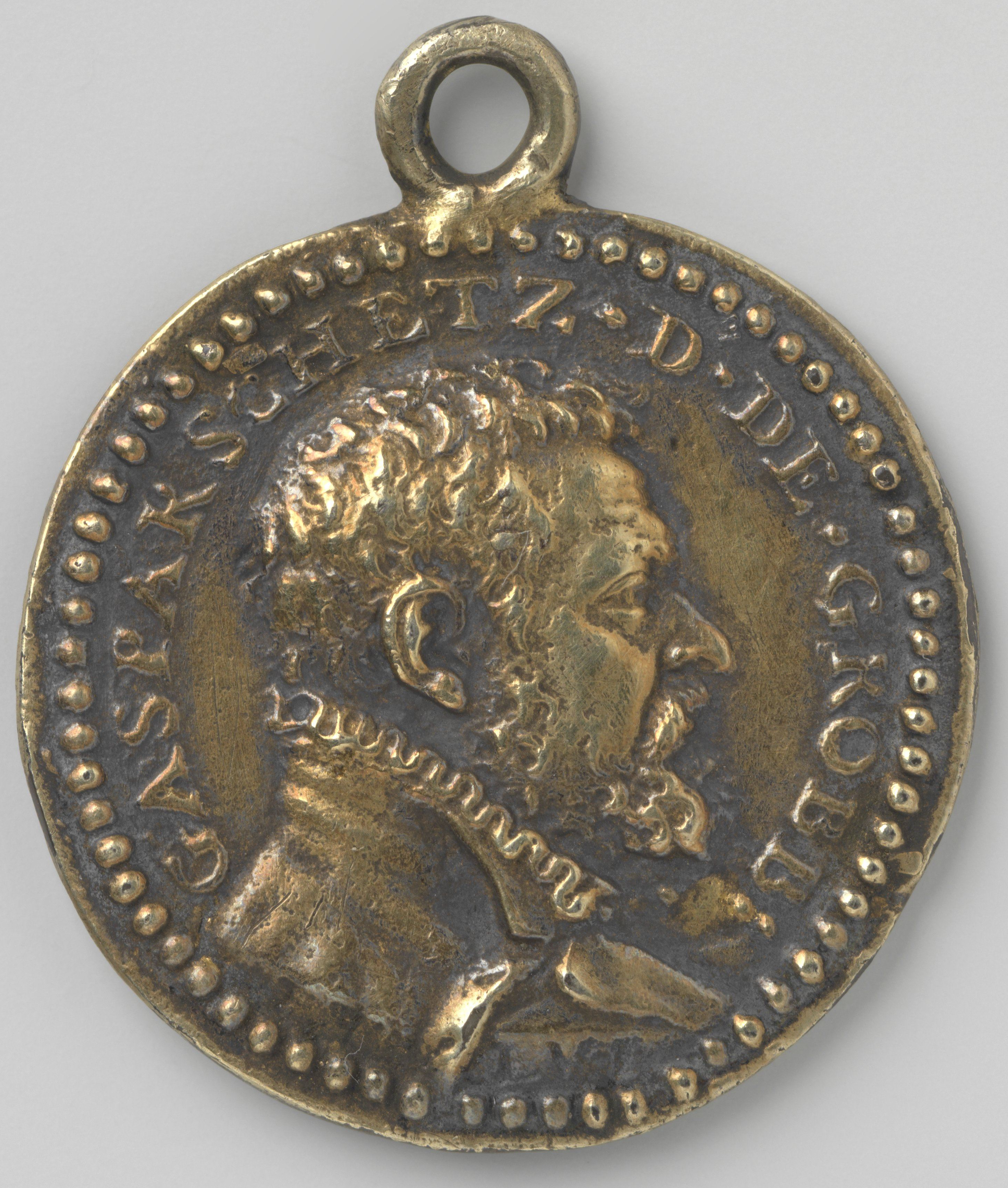
Silver medal with a portrait of Gaspar Schetz, from the Rijksmuseum, Amsterdam

Gaspar Schetz (1513–1580), Lord of Grobbendonk, Hereditary Marshal of Brabant was a financier and statesman in the Habsburg Netherlands. For reasons that are unknown he was nicknamed "Corvinus".

== Life ==
Gaspar Schetz was born in Antwerp on 20 July 1513, the son of Erasmus II Schetz, Lord of Usbach and Grobbendonk, and Ida Van Rechtergem. Active in finance and commerce, he maintained a lively interest in literature. From Charles de Brimeu, the last lord of Meghem, he purchased the lordship of Wezemaal, which brought with it the title of hereditary marshal of the Duchy of Brabant.

== Career and power ==
By letters patent of 25 November 1555 Philip II of Spain appointed Schetz royal factor in Antwerp. In 1564 he was made treasurer general of the royal finances in the Low Countries. In the early years of the Dutch Revolt he was highly active in seeking ways to keep the Army of Flanders paid regularly, and in the negotiations to secure the new bishoprics, founded in 1559, a regular income from the assets held by the medieval abbeys of the Low Countries. He was among those who invited Archduke Matthias to the Low Countries in 1578.

Gaspard was even very respected by the Dutch aristocracy, even the duke of Alva wrote to the King of Spain: Schetz is their living God, they all swear in his faith!

On 5 March 1579, Grobbendonk Castle was plundered and razed, Schetz's library going up in flames. In the same year, he took part in the peace talks at Cologne seeking the basis for a reconciliation between the Estates General and the King. He published a dialogue promoting his own perspective under the title Viri, pietate, moderatione, doctrinâque clarissimi, dialogus de Pace, rationes, quibus Belgici tumultus, inter Philippum, serenissimum et potentissimum Hispaniæ regem, et subditos, hoc rerum statu componi possint, explicans (Antwerp and Cologne, 1579).

He died at Mons on 9 November 1580.

== Family ==
His first wife was Margaretha van de Brugge, his second Catharina van Ursel, the daughter of Lancelot II of Ursel. His first wife gave him two children. But Catherine succeeded and gave birth to 13 children.

Descendants of Gaspard II Schetz x Catharina van Ursel:

- Lancelot I Schetz
- Isabeau Schetz
- Agnes Schetz
- Johan Karel Schetz, (1552-1595): Protonotary Apost. and Canon of the Cathedral in Liege; Chancellor of the Order of the Golden Fleece, died in Spain.
- Nicolas Melchior Schetz, Baron of Wesemael: He had the succession of his brother Conrard questioned in 1623.
- Conrad III Schetz, (1553–1632) 1st Baron of Hoboken who became father of the 1st Count of Ursel.
- Anthonie II Schetz, (1564-1640) 1st Count of Grobbendonk.
  - Lancelot II Schetz, 2nd Count of Grobbendonk.
  - Ignace Schetz, Bishop of Ghent.
