= Lancelot II of Ursel =

Belgian politician

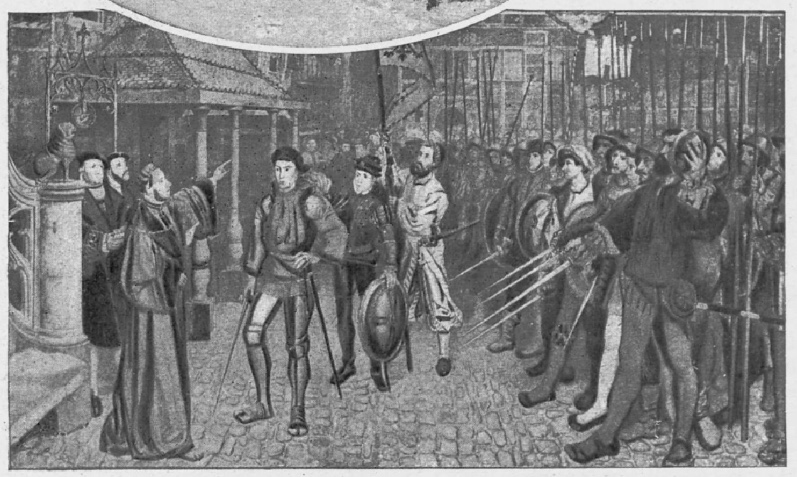

Lord Mayor of Antwerp

Personal details
- Spouse: Adriana Rockox

Ladislaus / Lanseloet', sometimes Lanschot van Ursele or Lancelot II of Ursel (1499–1573), Knight, was Mayor of Antwerp.

== Family ==
His ancestors were all members of political dynasties in Antwerp, his father John III of Ursel was Schepen of Antwerp. Lancelot married 3 times: first in 1520 to Barbe de Liere d'Immersele, and third on 7 May 1543 to Adriana Rockox, who died in 1558.

He was the brother in law of John III van de Werve, Lord of Hovorst, Schepen of Antwerp, married to Clara Rockox. His sister Mary was married to Martin, son of Gerald van de Werve, 5th Lord of Hovorst.

He died without male heirs, however his grandson Conrad III Schetz was adopted and took the name of Ursel. Amongst his descendants we find the future Dukes of Ursel.

=== Children ===
First Marriage:

- Catherine of Ursel, married to Gaspard II Schetz (1513–1580), Lord of Grobbendonk.
  - Conrad III Schetz, 1st Baron of Hoboken.
- Marie of Ursel, died 1601: marr. Ambrose Tucher, buried inside St-James.

Third Marriage:

- Barbe of Ursel, adopted the son of her sister, Conrad III.

== Career ==
Ursel was 13 times Lord Mayor of Antwerp. He was in office in the years 1532, 1533, 1534, 1538, 1539, 1542, 1544, 1545, 1547, 1548, 1563, 1565 and 1570. He was a protector of Ioannes Servilius. During his office he installed Hendrik de Moy as secretary of the City of Antwerp.

In 1533 Lancelot of Ursel played a major part in the salvation of the Cathedral of Antwerp during the great fire. People believe that thanks to his active help and coordination, the cathedral was saved from total ruin. Unfortunately 57 altars could not be saved and went up in flames. Lancelot had serious injuries but survived the ordeal, confirmed Francesco Guicciardini in his letters.
