= Siege of Rheinberg (1601) =

1601 siege of Rheinberg

Coordinates: 51.5466°N 6.6005°E

- Part of the Eighty Years' War & the Anglo–Spanish War
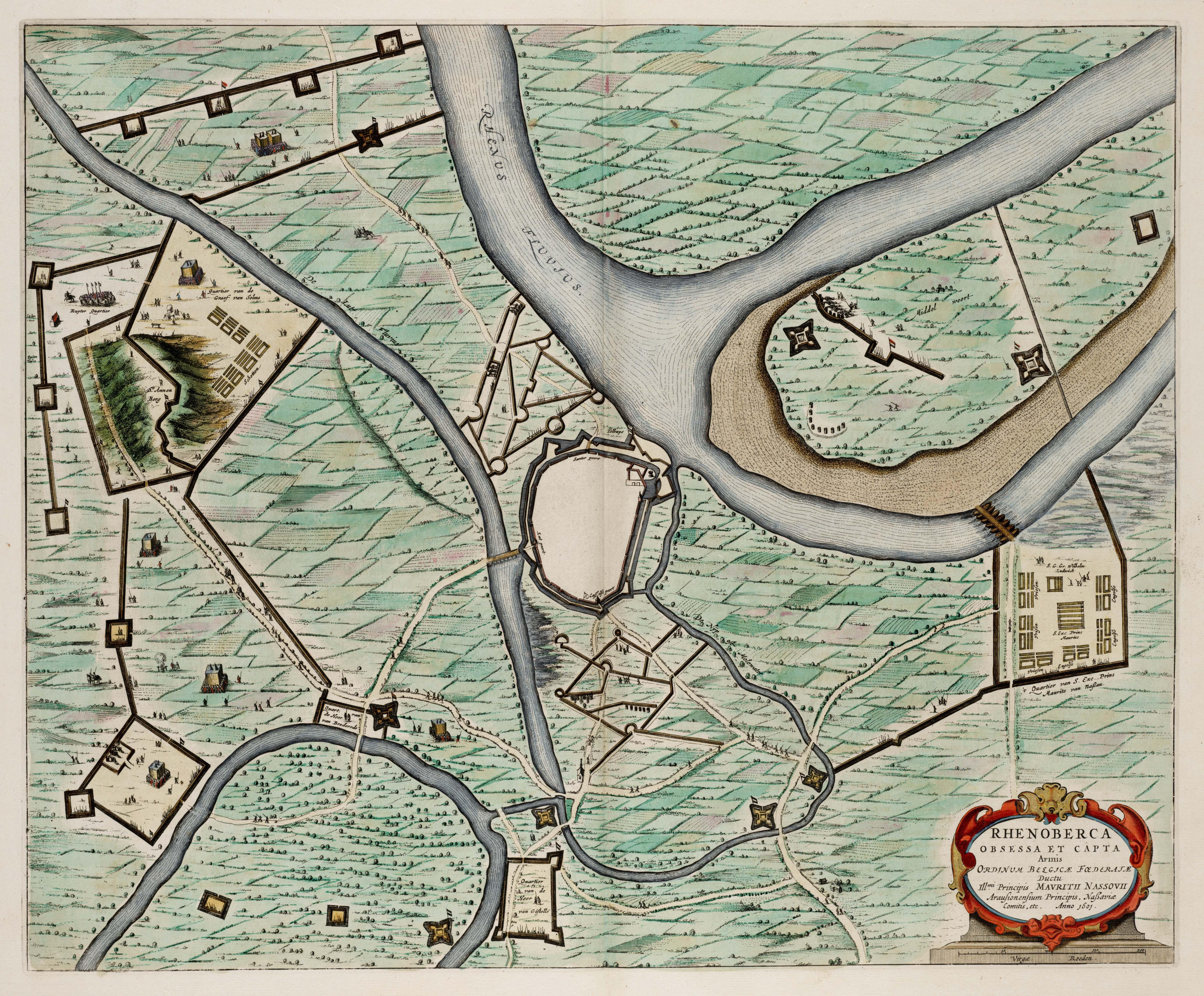
- Siege of Rheinberg 1601 from the Atlas Van Loon
| Date | 12 June – 2 August 1601 |
| Location | Rheinberg & Meurs (present-day Germany) |
| Result | Dutch and English victory |

Belligerents
| Dutch Republic; England | Spain |

Commanders and leaders
| (Dutch Republic) Maurice of Orange (England) Robert Bertie | (Spain) Luis Bernardo de Avila (Rheinberg) (Spain) Herman van den Bergh (Relief) |

Strength
| 10,000 | 3,000 (Rheinberg); 5,200 (Relief) |

Casualties and losses
| 400 killed or wounded | ~3,500 killed, wounded, or captured |
- Location within North Rhine-Westphalia Siege of Rheinberg (1601) (Germany)

The siege of Rheinberg, also known as the Rhine campaign of 1601, was the siege of the towns of Rheinberg (Old Dutch: Rijnberk) and Meurs from 12 June to 2 August 1601 during the Eighty Years' War and the Anglo–Spanish War. Maurice of Orange with an Anglo-Dutch army besieged the Spanish-held cities in part to distract them before their impending siege at Ostend. Rheinberg, an important city, eventually capitulated on 28 July after a Spanish relief force under Herman van den Bergh failed to relieve the city. The towns of Meurs surrendered soon after.

== Background ==
In mid-June 1601 Albert of Austria was in preparation to besiege the Anglo-Dutch held town of Ostend, and at the same time the States General demanded that the stadtholder Maurice of Orange should march to relieve the city. Francis Vere, the English governor of Ostend, was frustrated at the lack of Dutch response from both the States General and from Maurice; particularly when a few veteran English companies including Edward Cecil's, were taken out of Ostend to join Maurice's forces in the field. Maurice however knowing the futility in making a direct attack, chose to campaign in the surrounding areas closer to the core of the Dutch Republic. The strategy that would be used was hoped to block Spanish supplies and divert the attention of the Spanish aiming to besiege Ostend.

On 7 June Maurice camped his troops with a well appointed force of about 10,000 men and marched to the Rhine. Included in this force was an English army of 2,500 men under the temporary command of Robert Bertie, Lord Willoughby between Arnhem and Schenkenschans. Targets included the Spanish held towns of Grave and 's-Hertogenbosch, but also Rheinberg which had changed hands four times since 1589, and the latter was chosen. Rheinberg had a large garrison of over 3,000 men, many of whom were crack troops from Spain under the experienced Don Luis Bernardo de Avila who had ample supplies for a long siege.

== Campaign ==
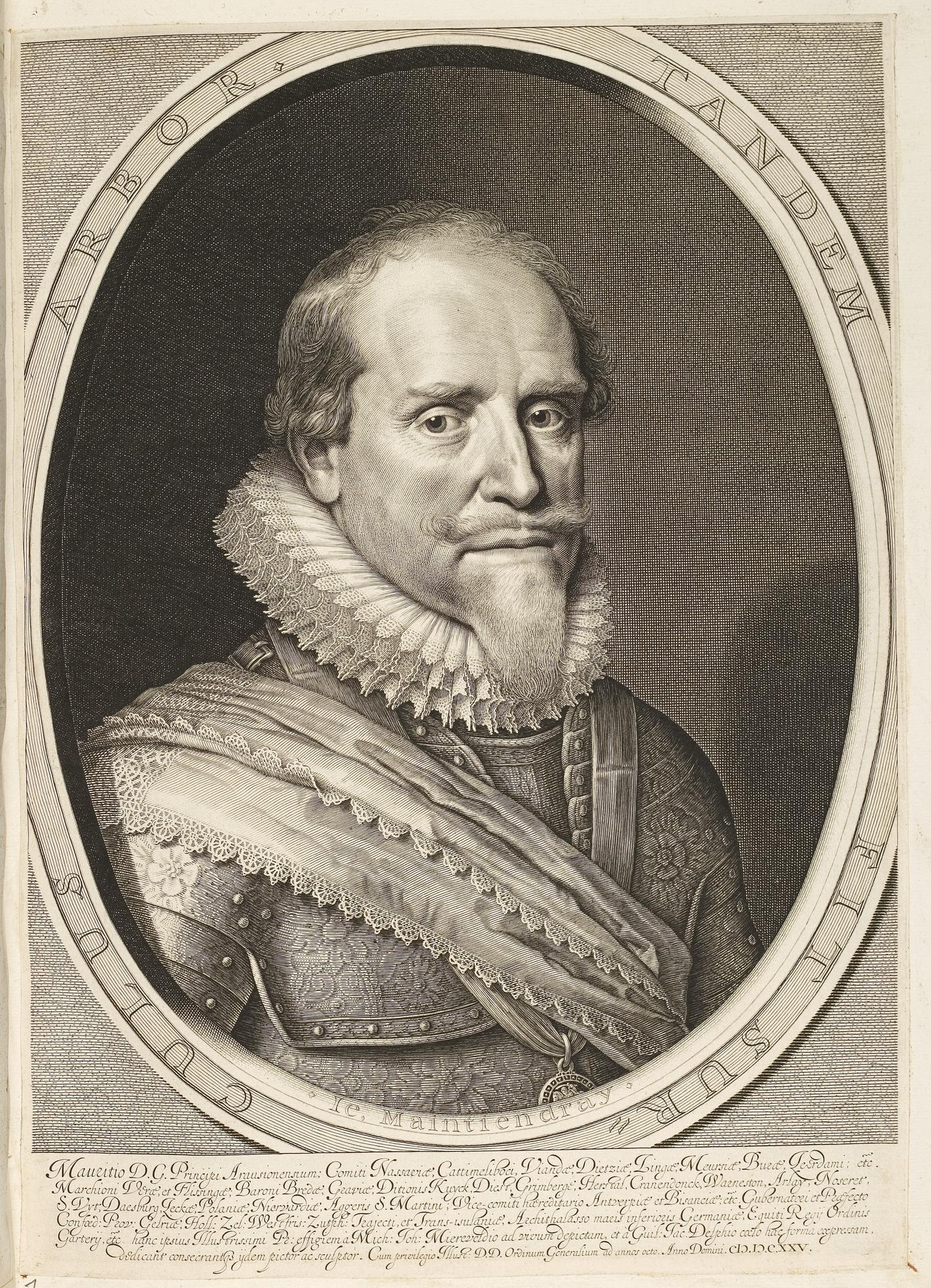
Maurice of Orange

On 10 June 1601 Maurice took to the field and two days later the Anglo-Dutch surrounded Rheinberg and soon siege works were dug and constructed around the town. Within a few days however Maurice had received orders to release almost 2,000 men including many of his veteran English and Scottish troops as reinforcements to Ostend. Disturbed by the calculations of his decreasing besieging force he hoped that the town would surrender before more troops were ordered away.

On 29 June Henry Percy, 9th Earl of Northumberland and other nobles came to Rheinberg to learn the art of siege warfare. At the same time the Earl placed himself in temporary command of the English forces which caused friction between himself and the English commander Lord Willoughby. On 5 July the siege of Ostend began and soon after Percy visited Ostend hoping to learn more, putting Lord Willoughby back in charge.

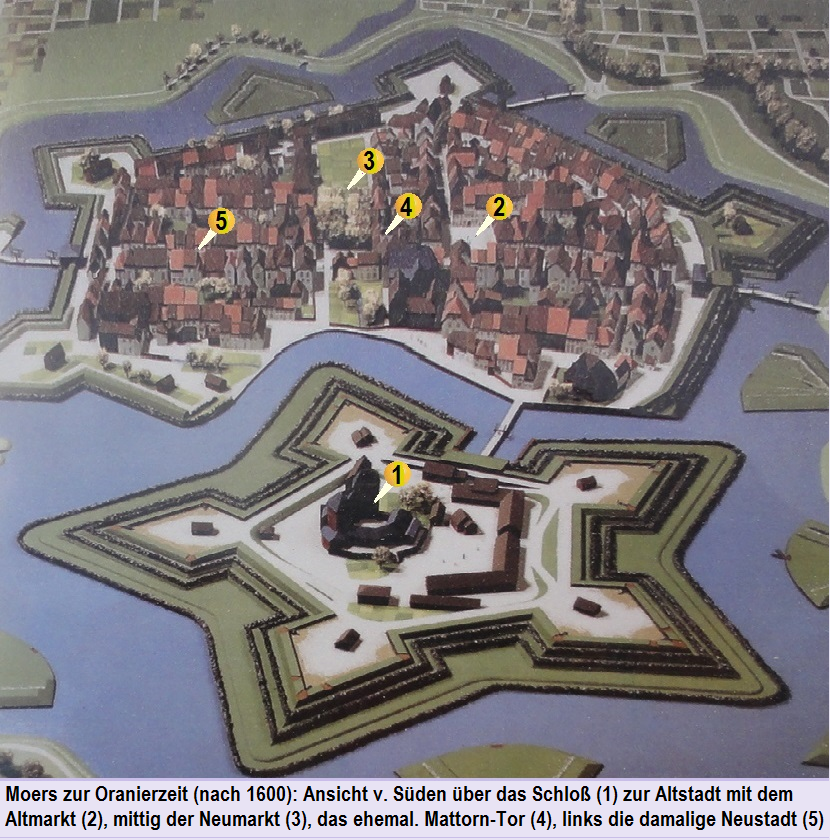
Model of Meurs as it would have looked around 1600

Meanwhile, Count Herman van den Bergh had marched from Spanish Flanders with 5,000 men and 2,000 cavalry to try to relieve Rheinberg, but as he approached his leading elements probed the defences and found it well intact. After an attack was repelled and van den Bergh realised that the Anglo-Dutch force stood firm, he did not want to risk an open battle and decided to retreat leaving the garrison to its fate.

Maurice's siege works proved effective - his pioneers sprang a mine under the Kassel gate. On 26 July the mine was detonated doing much damage and inflicting huge losses - according to one witness many were thrown into the air. Maurice persisted in his operations and three days later mines were placed elsewhere, which was eventually abandoned as Luis De Avila decided all hope was lost and surrendered on the 30th.

After leaving a garrison in Rheinberg Maurice then marched South to Meurs. They laid siege to the city on 2 August 1601 which after a brief bombardment and no hope of relief the Spanish garrison almost immediately surrendered.

== Aftermath ==
The victory was celebrated in Holland and a triumphal medal was created with the inscription; the enemy threatening fearful things is driven from Berg.

Rheinberg, because it had been besieged many times throughout the war, became known as the whore of war. The place was next besieged in 1606 by Ambrogio Spinola in his campaign and was captured. Rheinberg remained in Spanish hands until 1632 when Frederick Henry retook the city which remained in Dutch hands.

The Dutch were determined to fortify both towns with their own troops, no longer trusting the neutrality of the German prince's garrison. Thus the keys to the land of Cleves and Julliers the scene of the Francisco de Mendoza's successful and brutal campaign were now held by the stadholder. Maurice then sent more reinforcements to Ostend and halted further campaigning for two months. In November he tried to take 's-Hertogenbosch but the onset of a brutal cold winter and the threat of a Spanish relief force under Van den Bergh forced Maurice into winter quarters.

Meurs stayed in Dutch hands and would remain a part of the Dutch Republic until 1712 when it became a part of Prussia.
