= Lord of Grobbendonk =

Feudal Flemish title originating from Grobbendonk

The black bird is the weapon to the Schetz family

Lord of Grobbendonk is a feudal Flemish title originating from Grobbendonk. This title belongs today to the Belgian nobility.

== History ==
The origin of this important hereditary title goes back to the 13th century. The lordship was in possession of different Flemish noble houses at different times: van Wilre, van Crayenhem, Brant, van Jauche, van Mastaing, and finally Schetz. The lordship was created a county in 1637 by royal decree of King Philip IV of Spain. Currently it is held by the descendants of the house of Schetz: the current duke of Ursel is still Count of Grobbendonk.

== Lords of Grobbendonk ==
- Hendrik van Wilre, Lord of Grobbendonk and Lord Mayor of Leuven.
- Arnold, Lord of Crayenhem and Grobbendonq, died 1302. x Marie of Wesemaele.
- Arnold II of Crayenhem 1360-, Lord of Grobbendonk.
  - Isabeau of Craienhem, Lady of Grobbendoncq, married to Jean III Brant, 3rd lord of Ayseau.
    - Arnoult Brant, Lord of Grobbendoncq; married to Catherine of Heinsberge.
      - Marghareta Brant; Lady of Grobbendoncq: sold Grobbendoncq to:
- Philip of Cleves, Lord of Ravenstein
  - Amelberga of Cleves, Lady of Grobbendoncq; married to Andrew of Jauche, Count of Mastaing
    - Philippe of Jauches, Lord of Grobbendoncq

=== House of Schetz ===
- Erasmus II Schetz, died 1550, Lord of Usbach and Grobbendonk,
- Gaspard II Schetz, (1513–1580), Lord of Grobbendonk, Lord of Wezenmael.
- Anthonie II Schetz, (1564–1641), since 1602 Baron of Grobbendonk, since in 1637 1st Count of Grobbendonck, Royal decree of King Felipe IV.
- Lancelot II Schetz, (died 1664), 2nd Count of Grobbendonk, lord mayor of Brussels.
- Conrad III Schetz, later Conrad d'Ursel (1553–1632), 1st Baron of Hoboken.

=== House of Ursel ===
- Conrard-Albert, 1st Duke d'Ursel, Count of Grobbendonk.
- Charles-Joseph, 4th Duke d'Ursel, Count of Grobbendonk.
- Marie Joseph Charles, 6th Duke d'Ursel, Count of Grobbendonk.
- Robert, 7th Duke d'Ursel, Count of Grobbendonk.
- Henry Charles Francis Joseph Marie, 8th Duke d'Ursel, Count of Grobbendonk.
- Antonin d'Ursel (1925–1989), 9th Duke of Ursel, Count of Grobbendonk.
- Stéphane d'Ursel (1971), 10th Duke of Ursel, Count of Grobbendonk.
