= Siege of Saint-Omer =

1638 battle of the Thirty Years' War

- Part of the Thirty Years' War and the Franco-Spanish War (1635-1659)
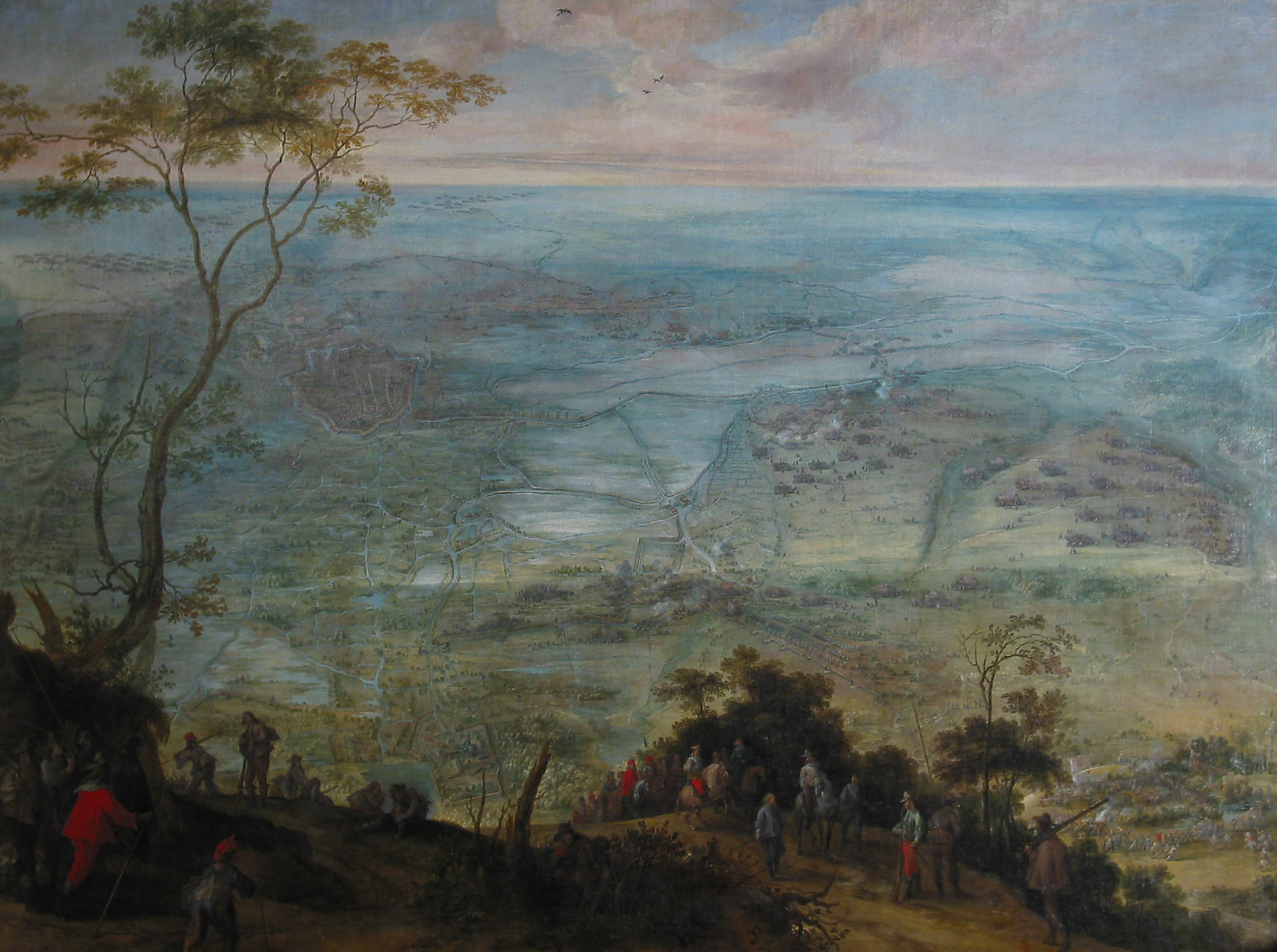
- The relief of Saint-Omer by Peter Snayers. Oil on canvas. Museo del Prado, Madrid.
Date	24 May – 16 July 1638
Location	Saint-Omer and its outskirts, Spanish Netherlands (present-day France) 50.7461°N 2.2617°E
Result	Imperial-Spanish victory

Belligerents
Spain; Holy Roman Empire	France

Commanders and leaders
(Spain) Cardinal-Infante Ferdinand (Spain) Prince of Carignano (Spanish Empire) Lancelot II Schetz (Holy Roman Empire) Ottavio Piccolomini	(Kingdom of France) Maréchal de Châtillon (Kingdom of France) Duc de La Force

Strength
20,000	29,000 10,000 infantry 3,000 cavalry 16,000 infantry and cavalry

Casualties and losses
At least 34 killed or wounded	4,000 killed or wounded 1,220 captured

The siege of Saint-Omer (24 May – 16 July 1638) was a siege in the Thirty Years' War in which a French army under Gaspard III de Coligny, Maréchal de Châtillon, laid siege to the Flemish city of Saint-Omer, defended by a small garrison in command of Lancelot II Schetz, count of Grobbendonck. Despite several initial successes in the capture of the minor forts around Saint-Omer, on the night of 8/9 June a Spanish relief army under Thomas Francis, Prince of Carignano, surprised Châtillon's troops and established a small fort in the middle of the French lines. An entire army corps under Maréchal de La Force was ordered to move towards Saint-Omer to support Châtillon siege, but on 12 July a further Imperial-Spanish force commanded by Ottavio Piccolomini entered Saint-Omer, resolving the French marshals to withdraw.

== Background ==
In June 1635 the allied armies of the Dutch Republic and France invaded the Spanish Netherlands from two sides and joined forces in the valley of the Meuse while the Spanish field army under the Cardinal-Infante fell back to cover Brussels. The invading armies captured a few smaller places before investing Leuven. The siege was a costly failure due to bad logistics and organization, and because the French army was decimated by the plague. The Cardinal-Infante was then able to counter-attack and pushed the Franco-Dutch army back to the Dutch border in the direction of Cleves, recapturing Diest and Tienen, and surprising the Dutch fortress of Schenkenschans, where a large garrison was put then in. The Duchy of Cleves was occupied during August and September with the aim of linking the fort with the main body of the Spanish Netherlands. while Frederick Henry, Prince of Orange, started the Siege of Schenkenschans. The fortress fell after a long and costly siege that lasted even through the winter months. Meanwhile, Cardinal Richelieu took the decision to remove Châtillon from command and focused France's effort in the Rhineland.

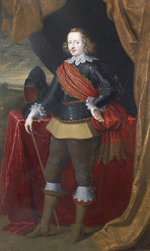
Cardinal-Infante Ferdinand of Austria, Governor of the Low Countries, attributed to Justus Sustermans

In the first months of 1636, while the French armies suffered further defeats against the Duke Charles of Lorraine and the Imperial generalissimo Matthias Gallas, the Count-Duke of Olivares insisted the Cardinal-Infante to continue concentrating the war effort in exploiting the gains in the Lower Rhine and in northern Brabant rather than in an offensive against France, even after the loss of Schenkenschans. In late May, however, the offensive operations were suspended and a secondary thrust was launched into France, according to the Cardinal-Infante, because of a dramatic change in circumstances. Philip IV wrote to his brother in June ordering him to advance into northern Brabant to try to recapture Schenkenschanz. Meanwhile, the Emperor, whose position in Germany had strengthened since the Peace of Prague, had projected an invasion of eastern France, but as his force was not large enough due to logistical problems, he proposed a joint invasion to the Cardinal-Infante.

On 4 July the Cardinal-Infante, commanding a lightly equipped army, crossed the frontier via Avesnes and took the fortresses of Le Catelet and La Capelle. Alarmed by this easy advance, the King of France Louis XIII was forced to move to Paris from Fontainebleau. The Spanish army, then led by Thomas Francis of Carignano, the commander of the Army of Flanders, successfully crossed the Somme and invested the vital fortress of Corbie, which surrendered a week later. Cardinal Richelieu had no other choice but to suspend the offensive against the Franche-Comté, ordering the army under Henri de Bourbon, Prince de Condé and Charles de La Porte de La Meilleraye to withdraw to defend Paris. Another one of Ferdinand's generals, Ottavio Piccolomini, tried to persuade the Cardinal-Infante to advance further into France, but Ferdinand considered that such operation could risk his army and soon retreated to Cambrai, before the Imperialist invasion had begun. The French armies regained most of the lost ground over the following months, including Corbie, an operation that absorbed the entire French army and was led directly by Richelieu.

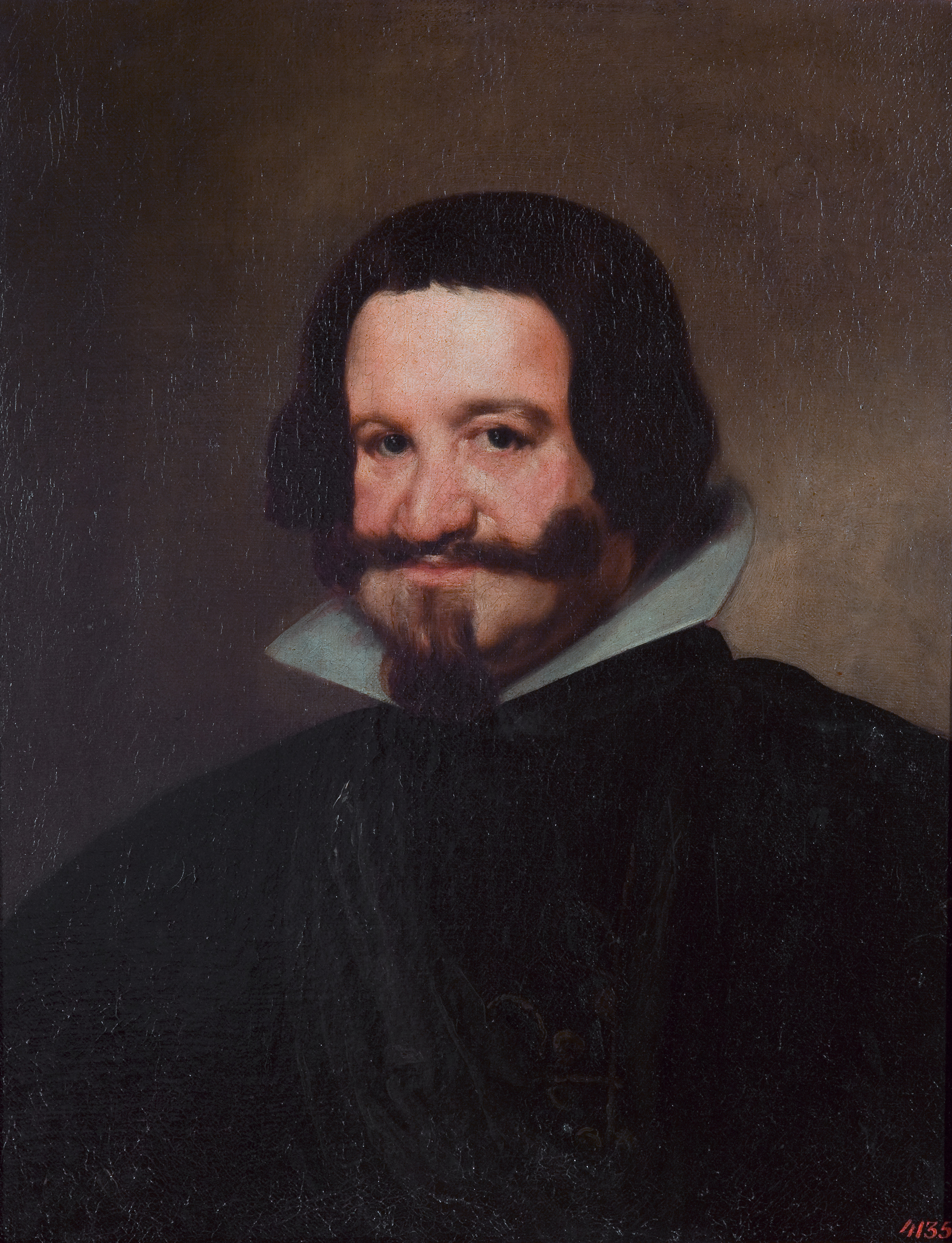
Portrait of Gaspar de Guzmán, Count-Duke of Olivares, by Diego Velázquez

Olivares, though distressed for the loss of Corbie, planned a renewed offensive against France for the following year, so Ferdinand began to mass his forces on the French border. In July Frederick Henry of Orange, seizing the moment, invested Breda in command of 22,000 soldiers. Garrisoned by 3,000 Spaniards, Italians, Wallons and Burgundians, Breda was one of the main fortresses of the Spanish Netherlands and a symbol of the Spanish power in Europe. A Spanish force under the Cardinal-Infante Ferdinand attempted to relieve the garrison of the city, but failed to dislodge the besiegers. Ferdinand decided move with his army to the valley of the Meuse, where he took Venlo and Roermond in order to distract Frederick Henry. He was, nevertheless, forced to turn back shortly after due to the French advances in Artois, Hainaut and Luxembourg, and Breda was captured by the Dutch on 7 October.

For the campaign of 1638, Philip IV instructed the Cardinal-Infante to undertake an offensive strategy against the Dutch in order to subject them to massive pressure and force them to agree a favourable truce and the restoration of their conquests in Brazil, Breda, Maastricht, Rheinberg and Orsoy. His main objective would be the capture of Rheinberg, which would give to Spain a crossing point in the Lower Rhine and contribute to tightening the blockade over Masstritch. Ferdinand was also ordered, when the offensive operations had finished, to quarter his army near the Dutch frontier to protect Antwerp, which had become vulnerable since the loss of Breda, and even to reinforce the garrisons of many secondary fortresses.

== Siege ==
=== First operations ===
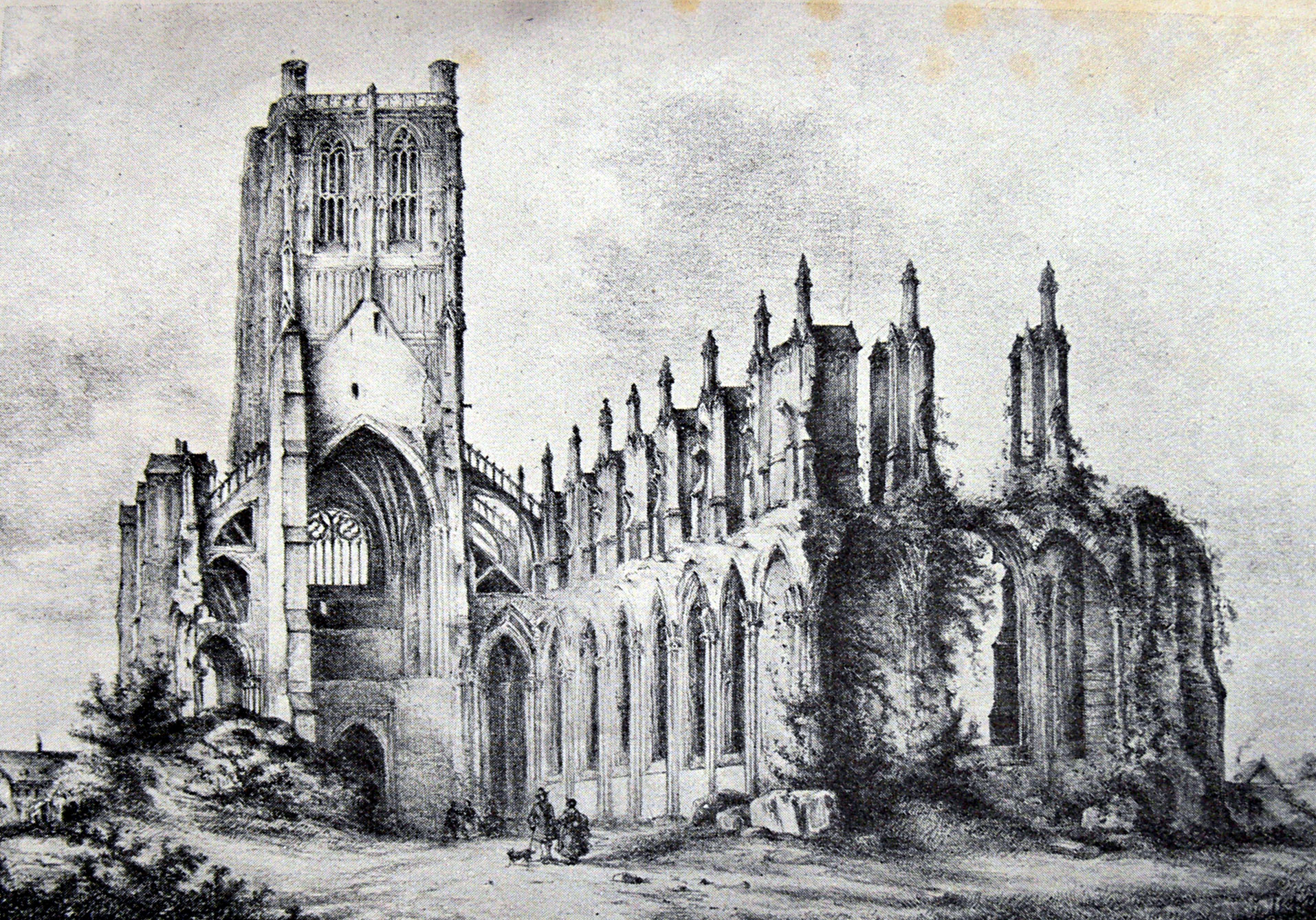
Lithographie representing the ruins of the church of Saint Bertin, by Ulysses Delhom

Châtillon, seeing that Saint-Omer was garrisoned just by 4 companies of the Tercio of José de Saavedra numbering 1,000 men and about 300 cavalry, while the town required more than 3,000 soldiers to be properly defended, resolved to besiege it. By 26 May his army had invested the town. Three days later the outpost of Arques was captured. Its defenders, 50 soldiers of the Walloon Tercio of Baron of Wezemaal and his officer, surrendered after a brief bombardment by the French artillery.

Having installed his headquarters in Arques, Châtillon proceeded to attack St. Bertin de Clairmarais Abbey, a good defensive position. Captains Lannoy and Dutally, of Wezemaal's tercio, hold back the French assaults until they lacked gunpowder, which forced them to surrender, even though in good conditions. The French Captain Campi of the Régiment de Navarre lost his arm during the fight. Châtillon's main objective was then to isolate Saint-Omer by blocking all the accesses to the town. With this aim he sent Sieur de La Ferté-Imbault to capture all the forts located between Ardres and Saint-Omer, which would also secure their own supplies, brought from Calais. The strongest fortresses, Dumenghen and Ennuin, could not be taken. Duc de la Force's troops had to be therefore employed to protect the supply convoys against possible ambushes.

Paul-Bernard de Fontaines, a Lorrainer in Spanish service who was governor of Bruges since 1629 and one of the oldest officers of the Army of Flanders, moved with his troops from Flanders to the village of Watten as soon as was informed of the French movements. From Watten Fontaine relieved Saint-Omer by sending to the town 4 companies of the Spanish Tercio of Marquis of Velada and 2 companies of the English Tercio of William Tresham, all of them commanded by Captain Luis de Mieses, who was ordered to take command of Saint-Omer's garrison for being the oldest officer in the town. Lancelot II, Count of Grobbendock, the former commander who was either in Saint-Omer, was given the order of defend the outpost of Bacq, a crucial position to receive relief from the Spanish lines since it controlled a channel of the river Aa giving access to the town. Châtillon was warned by many of his officers, Sieurs de La Barre, de Manican and Le Rasle, of the urgent need to take Bacq. The French marshall avoided a direct assault, but the fort was eventually occupied when Baron of Wezemaal, seeing the weakness of his position, decided to withdraw into Saint-Omer with his troops.

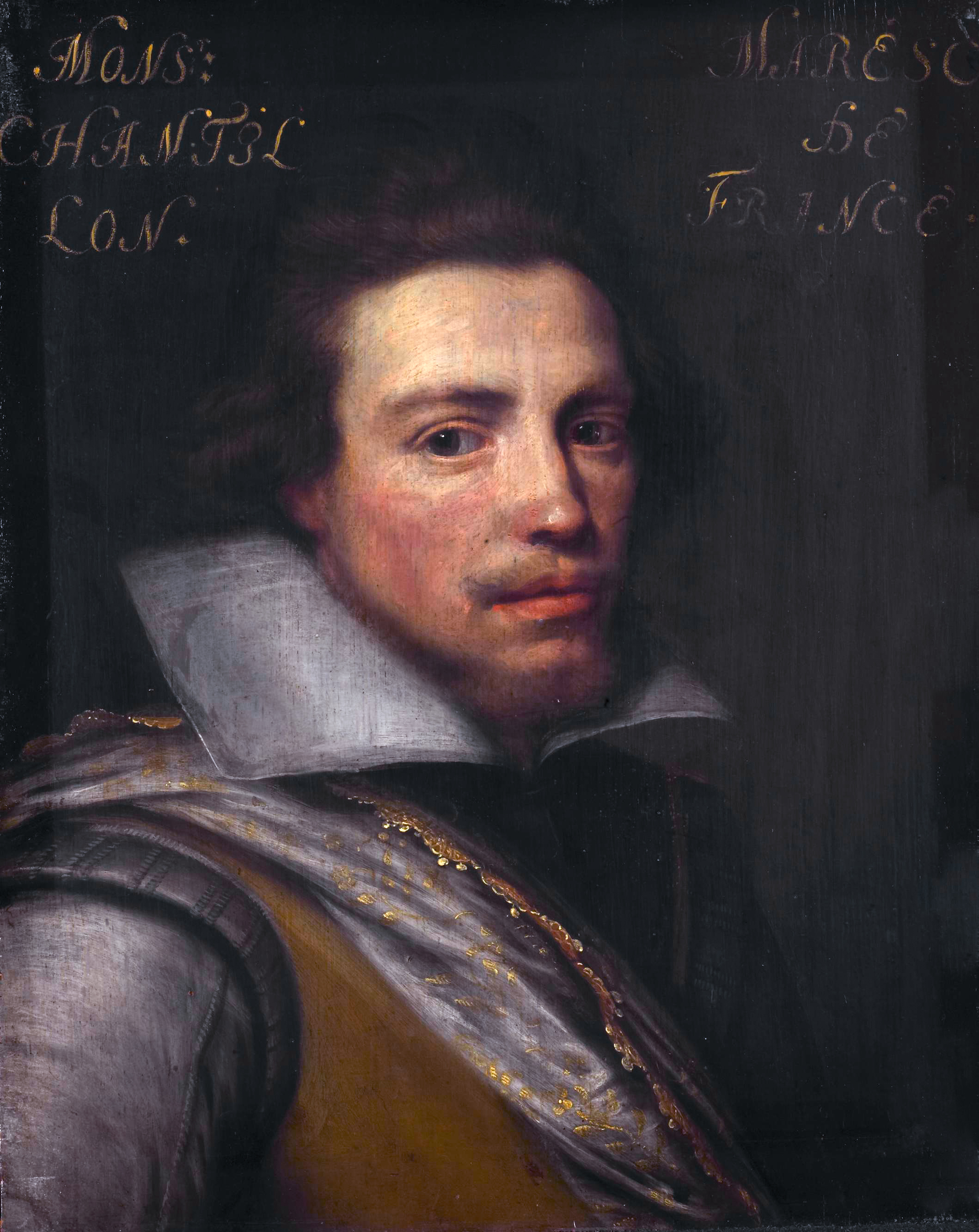
Portrait of Gaspard de Coligny (1584–1646), count of Châtillon sur Loing, by Jan Antonisz. van Ravesteyn

Having left a garrison under Sieur de Genlin in Bacq, Châtillon proceeded to capture 3 small forts defending the Canal de Neufossé to continue the circumvallation of Saint-Omer. The strongest of them, in command of Viscount Furnes, Great bailiff of Cassel, capitulated without opposing resistance. The other two, defended by the villeins of the Castellany, were taken by Châtillon, being that most of their defenders were slaughtered. French cavalry troops under Colonel Silar were then able to cross the Neufossé and enter Flanders, where they plundered Cassel and several other villages before returning with Châtillon. A great booty was obtained. Lieutenant General François de L'Hospital, Seigneur Du Hallier, meanwhile, had occupied the Abbey of Ouate. Fontaine, whose position in Watten had become insecure due to the loss of the forts around Saint-Omer, decided to retreat to Bergues-St. Vinocx after set fire to the village to avoid its use by the French. He later marched to Brussels to be appointed General of the artillery.

=== First relief ===
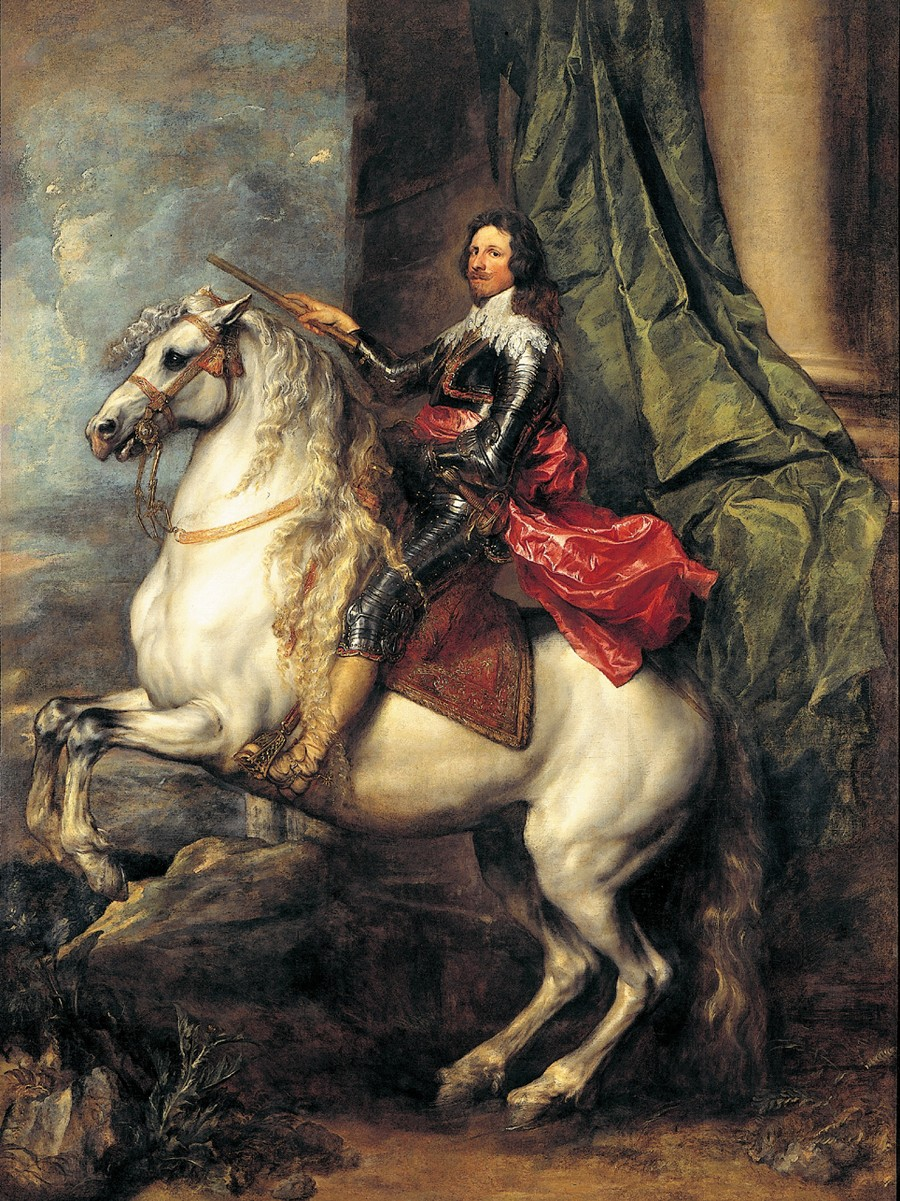
Thomas Francis, Prince of Carignano by Anthony van Dyck

Count Ernest von Isenburg-Grenzau, having been ordered to move to Flanders diligently, departed Arleux with the Tercios of Carlo Guasco and Francesco Toralto, an artillery Lieutenant General with several artillery pieces, Don Juan de Vivero with some cavalry, and three companies of Wezemaal's tercio. He passed Béthune and arrived at Chocques, joining forces during the march with José de Saavedra's Tercio and its cavalry. They crossed the river Lys at Merville, and a day later reached Poperinge, where the Prince Thomas of Carignano took the command of the Spanish army. Most of his troops were quartered in Bourbourg and other nearby villages while he and his staff discussed how relieve Saint-Omer, a difficult task, as the majority of the forts around the town were occupied by the French, whose army was twice as large as the Spanish. Châtillon's soldiers, however, had not begun to dig trenches around the town yet because his commander was awaiting orders to do it when the Dutch States Army had launched its offensive against Antwerp. Despite his passive attitude, Saint-Omer's reduced garrison was in need of supplies and gunpowder.

Thomas of Carignano, seeing that the Imperial army under Ottavio Piccolomini could not arrive on time, resolved to relieve the town alone to enable its garrison to keep the resistance for longer. With this aim he disposed four flying squadrons, each one on 1,000 men, commanded respectively by Maestre de Campo Alfonso Pérez de Vivero, Count of Fuensaldaña, Maestre de Campo Owen Roe O'Neill, Sargento Mayor Dionisio de Guzmán of Fuensaldaña's tercio; and Maestro de Campo Francesco de Toralto. They were accompanied by the Neapolitan Tercio of Toralto, the tercio of Marquis de Velada under Sargento Mayor Juan Porcel, the German Regiments of Colonels Spinola and Rouveroy, the English Tercios of William Tresham and Henry Gage, Owen Roe O'Neill's Irish tercio under his Sargento mayor, José de Saavedra's Tercio divided in two squadrons, one of them under Saavadera himself and the other under'Sargento Mayor Diego López de Zúñiga, and 2,000 cavalrymen under Johann von Nassau-Siegen, who was accompanied by Juan de Vivero, Lieutenant General of Cavalry of the Army of the French Frontier and Fuensaldaña's brother, and a Croatian regiment under Colonel Ludovico. Count of Forjaz was sent across the Neufossé to attack the French troops at their quarters while Francisco de Pardo, Commissar General of the Cavalry of the Army of the French Frontier, remained in the rear with several battalions.

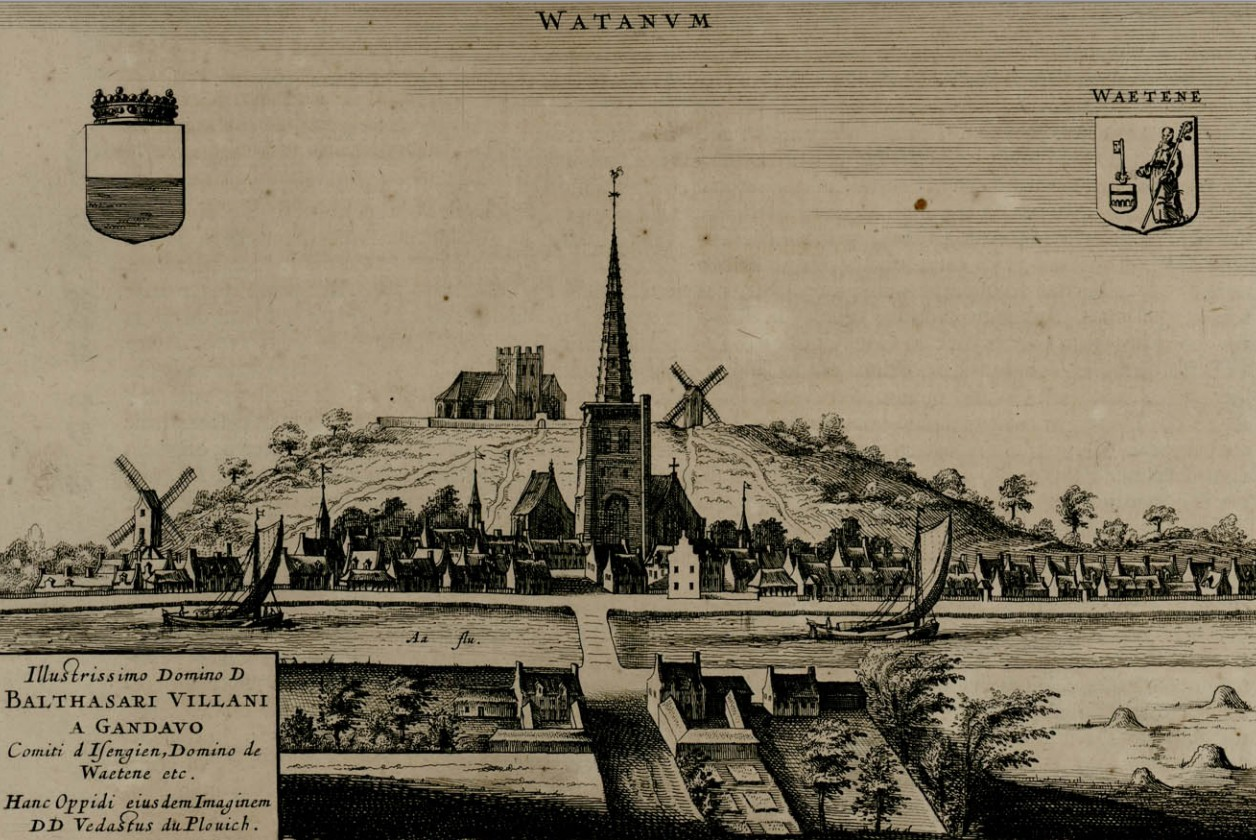
View of Watten in 1662. Engraving of Flandria Illustrata by Anton Sander

At the same time that the relief force marched to Saint-Omer, Thomas of Carignano sent Paolo Fanfanelli, Sargento Mayor of Carlo Guasco's tercio, and his soldiers, to occupy the tower of the Abbey of Watten, located on top of a hill and guarded by 50 French soldiers under an officer since Count Paul Bernard de Fontaine had abandoned the village. Lacking of supplies and discouraged by the size of the Spanish army, they promptly surrendered. Châtillon, thinking that Watten was a crucial position to control the riverside of the Neufossé, had dispatched the Regiments d'Espagni and de Fouquerolles over the village, but they arrived after the tower had surrendered.

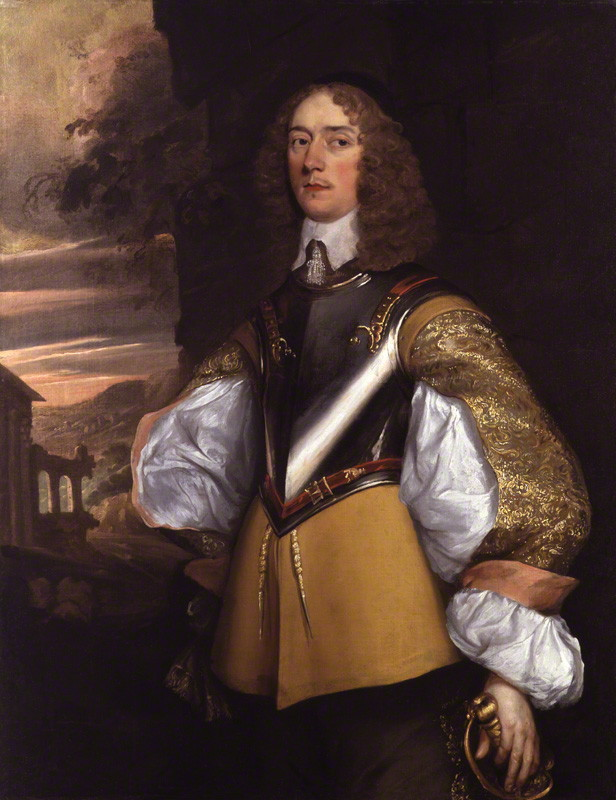
Portrait of Sir Henry Gage by John Weesop

Colonels Espagni and Fouquerolles, seeing the difficulty of withdraw, formed their regiments in a meadow surrounded by hedges, disposed to negotiate with the Spanish. Fanfanelli, nevertheless, attacked them. The Spanish cavalry, alerted by the shots, made soon appearance led by Francisco Pardo and overran the French troops, who threw their weapons down asking for mercy. Fanfanelli and Pardo accepted their surrender. After that, Guasco's Tercio and the cavalry took all the spoils and the baggage, leaving naked most of the French soldiers. The loss on the Spanish side was light and consisted of 2 captains, Marco Antonio Felice and Count Evandro Piccolomini, nephew of the Imperial marshall, and 5 soldiers killed. The French lost Colonel Fouquerolles, 5 captains and 22 soldiers killed being also 16 captains, 20 lieutenants, 17 second lieutenants, 13 sergeants, and 1,220 soldiers captured and took to Bourbourg. The ransom paid later for the prisoners was distributed between Guasco's Tercio and Pardo's cavalry.

Thomas of Carignan, having recognized the extensive French works around the Fort of Bacq, decided to encamp his army in the meadows of the area to avoid a pitched battle. During the night a relief operation was organized in coordination with the garrison of Saint-Omer. Captain Luis de Mieses exited the town with several boats and went to the village of Nieurlet through the canals of the marshes. 300 Germans of the Regiment Spinola, 200 Italians of the tercios of Guasco and Toralto, and 100 English of Henry Gage's tercio previously dispatched to the village under Colonel Giovanni Agostino Spinola, plus supplies consisting of gunpowder and matches provided by Marquis of Fuentes, were embarked aboard the boats and brought within the town. French troops opened fire over the boats with artillery and muskets, but the relief entered Saint-Omer without difficulties, and Spinola was able to return to the Spanish camp. Thomas of Carignano was satisfied with the outcome of the operation and returned to Bourbourg with his troops. On his arrival the army was disbanded and each unit returned to its quarter.

=== Siege of Saint-Omer ===
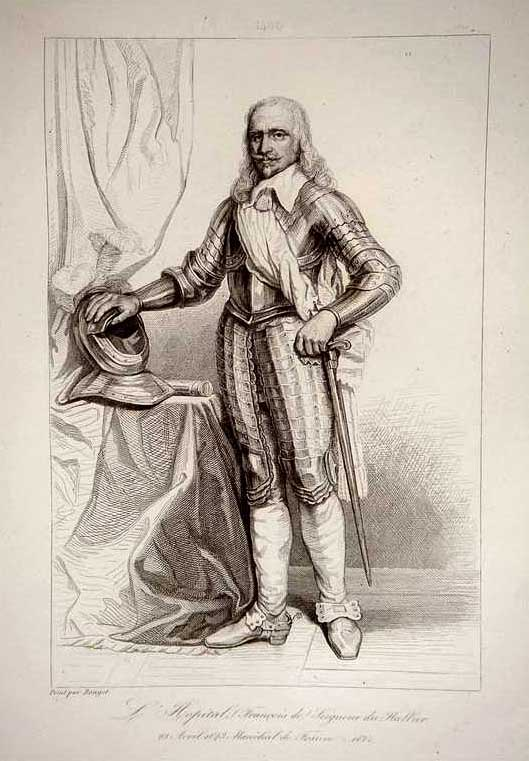
Anonymous engraving of François de L'Hospital, seigneur du Hallier

Although Saint-Omer had been relieved, the pressure over the town increased, and at the same time the Dutch States Army captured one of the major Spanish forts defending Antwerp. Piccolomini remained then in Brabant with his troops to relief, if necessary, the Cardinal-Infante. The French, meanwhile, continued working in the forts and redoubts of the circumvallation line. Châtillon directed the works from his headquarters while Du Hallier reinforced the garrison of Bacq and Clairmarais Abbey, whose works had been finished by 14 June. The marshy land that surrounded Saint-Omer, however, greatly impeded the digging of trenches, the building of redoubts, and the passage of horses and convoys. During those days one of La Force officers, Sieur de Lermont, began to work a fort in a levee coming from Ardres to secure definitely Châtillon's corps supplies. It was promptly captured by the Spanish, and Châtillon, pressed by its loss, asked Louis XIII to approach La Force's corps to Saint-Omer to tighten the siege over the town. The king was surprised by this demand, since shortly before Châtillon had requested the dispatch of the Regiments of Jean de Gassion and Henri de La Ferté-Senneterre with the condition that he would not ask for more reinforcements, but La Force was eventually ordered by Louis's ministers to move towards Châtillon to support him and quartered his troops at Zutkerque.

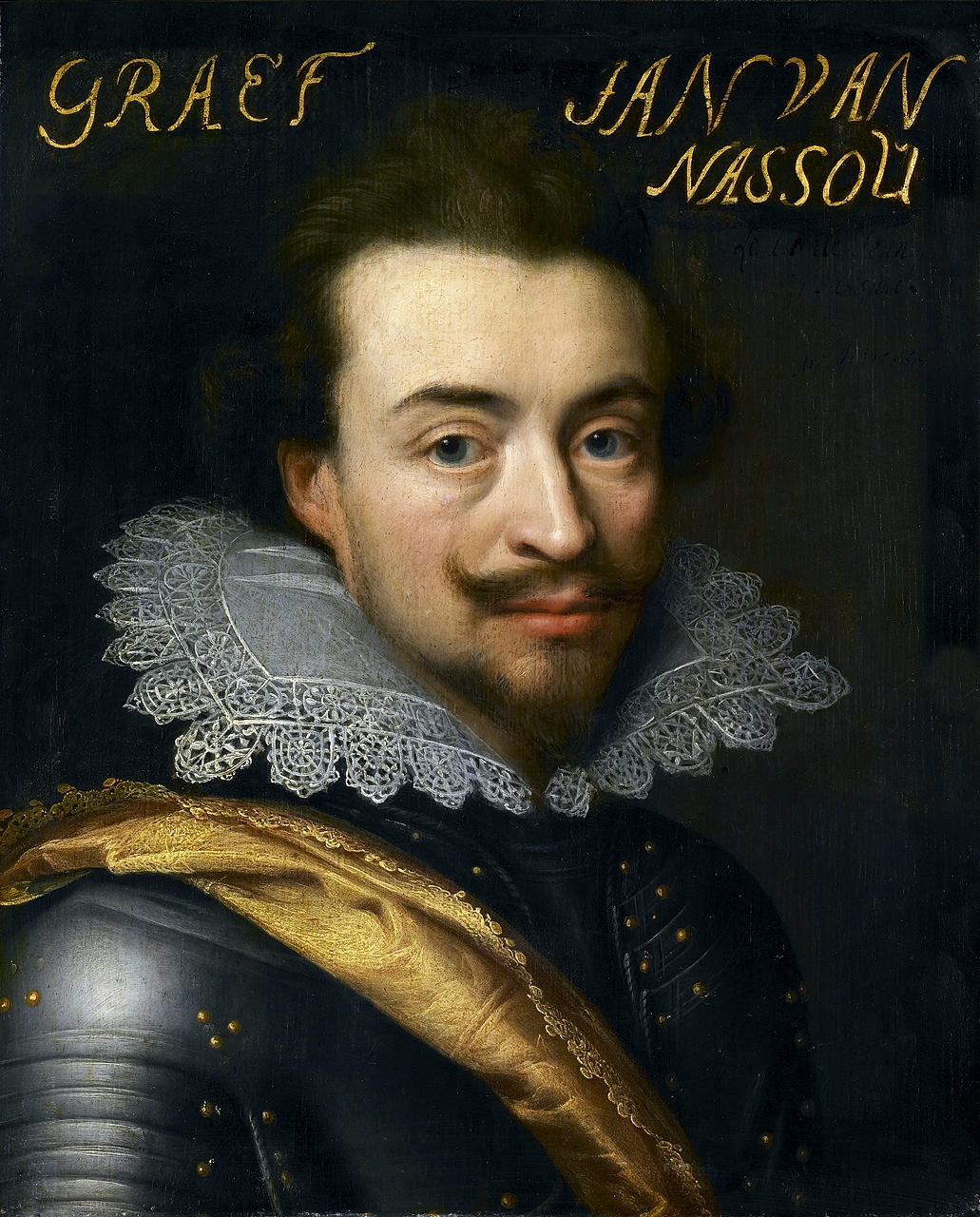
Portrait of Johann von Nassau-Siegen by Jan Antonisz. van Ravesteyn.

Thomas of Carignano sent Johann von Nassau-Siegen in command of most of the Spanish cavalry and a flying squadron of all the tercios under Maestre de Campo Francesco de Toralto to expel the French troops from a newly built redoubt which defended a levee in Hennuin near La Force's position, but they retreated considering that the levee was too close to attack without carrying boards as protection against the musketry fire. Thomas of Carignano found then necessary reinforce the village of Ruminghem to avoid its occupation by the French. That mission was easily accomplished by José de Saavedra and his tercio. The prince considered the following morning attack himself the French fort and moved with all his troops to Ardres. He sent Captain Gilles, an engineer, to prepare the works needed for the assault, which were built over a week. A 50-men cavalry party led by the Count of Fuensaldaña, nevertheless, confirmed Toralto views on the narrows of the levee.

By the night of 29/30 June the French sappers began to dig trenches towards the ramparts of Saint-Omer. The Spanish garrison sent Ensign Ochoa across the French lines to warn Thomas of Carignano of the problem. The siege works concentrated on the hill of Saint Michel, which was free of swamps. Several batteries were installed atop of the hill and a fierce bombardment ensued, being a large number of buildings damaged by the mortar shells. The command of Saint-Omer, then consisting of a council whose members were Ochoa, the Viscount of Lier, Monsieur de Branduque, Baron of Wezemaal, Luis de Mieses and the Sargento Mayor of the Regiment Spinola, decided that the most exposed ravelins would be occupied by the Spaniards of the tercios of Saavedra and Velada. The night of 2 July, several soldiers under Captain don Rodrigo de Rojas, of Velada's tercio, made a sortie against Du Hallier works, but were rejected by the Scottish Regiment of Colonel Lord James Douglas. Rojas received a musket shot in the leg, but survived.

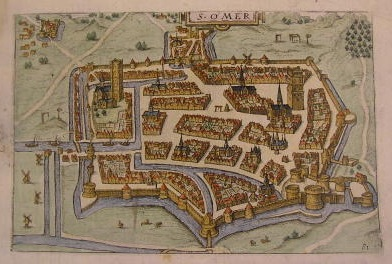
Map of Saint-Omer in 1612 by Joan Blaeu.

Thomas of Carignano, once warned by Ochoa, resolved to capture the redoubt near Bacq. He feared a revolt of the population of the town against the garrison, and although the Bishop and the Abbot of St. Bertin de Clairmarais placated them, it was suspected that somebody within the city maintained contact with the French. For the attack on the fort, known as Fort St. Jean, the Prince put 600 Spaniards of the tercios of Saavedra and Velada, 200 Germans of the Regiment of Rouvroy and 200 Irish of O'Neill's tercio under Maestre de Campo José de Saavedra, besides 4 artillery pieces and 2 cavalry companies. The prince informed Saavedra that he would find 2,000 fagots to cover the front of the trenches at the bridge of Sainte-Marie-Kerque and told him that most of the cavalry under Johann von Nassau-Siegen and 2,000 infantry commanded by Count of Fuensaldaña and Francesco de Toralto would isolate St. Jean from any force of relief.

=== Capture of Fort St. Jean ===
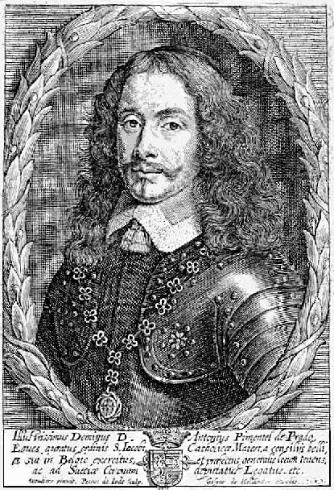
Captain Antonio Pimentel de Prado, engraving by Peter de Jode over a drawing by Caspar Heilandre.

Saavedra and his troops arrived at Fort St. Jean during the night. The Maestre de Campo sent Captain Don Bartolomé del Río to inspect the area while two pieces of artillery were mounted in the levee and the other two atop of a hill west of the levee. The noise alerted a guard who shot his musket, thus putting on alert the garrison of the fort. Saavedra ordered then 100 of his soldiers and 100 of Velada's tercio to dig snake-shaped trenches at the outlet of the channel. The Germans of Rouvroy dug their trenches from the hill. When the night was dark and it began to rain, Saavedra ordered his 4 pieces to open fire over the fort. The French garrison responded with a heavy musketry fire. An accident occurred when a cannonball killed a Spaniard and pulled the leg of another one. Saavedra suspended the fire and sent a drummer to warn the defenders that if they did not surrender, they would be massacred. The officer in charge of the fort responded that they relied that La Force would succor them and that he would give a response to Saavedra eight days later.

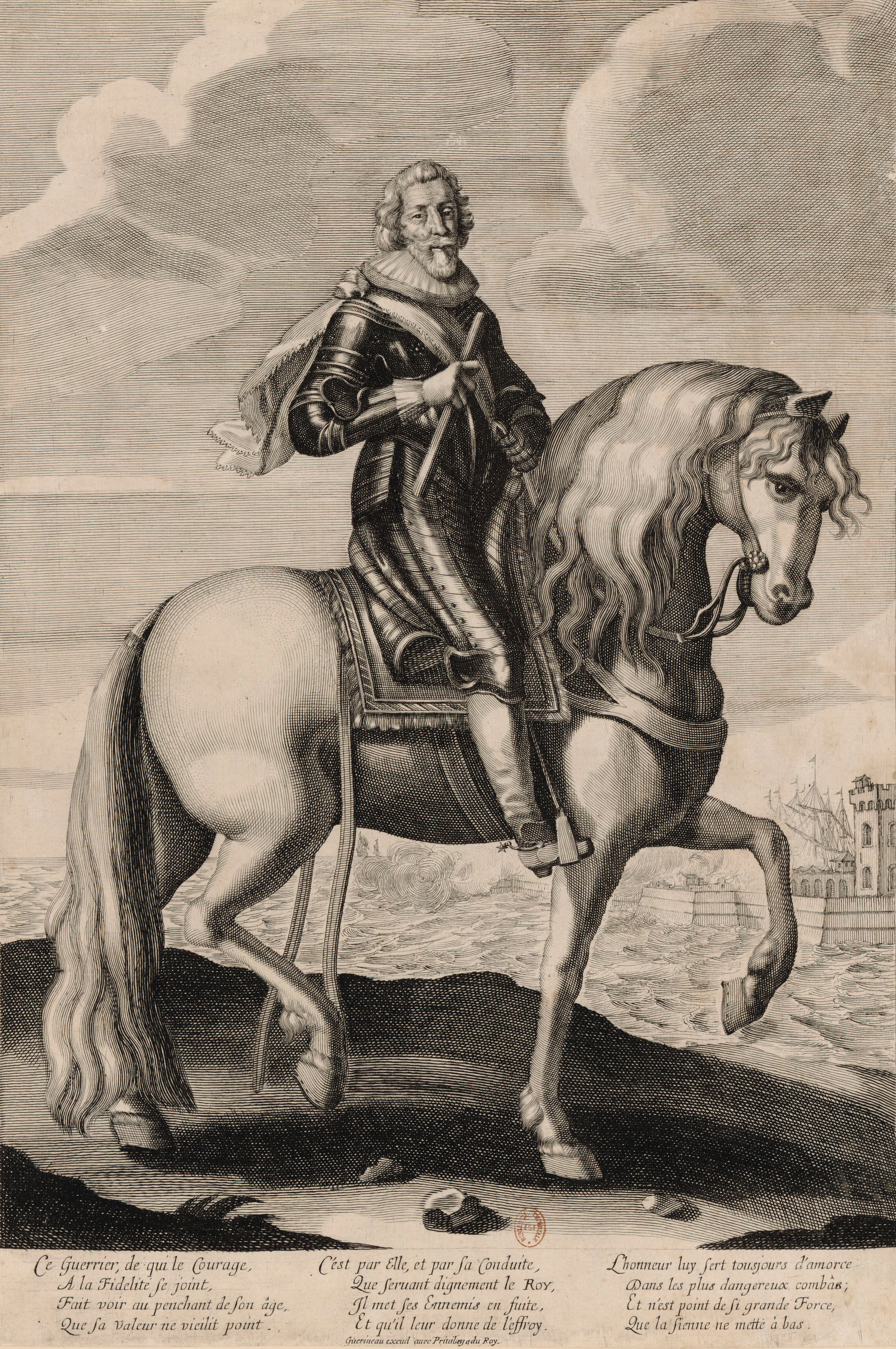
Engraving of Jacques-Nompar de Caumont, duc de la Force. Anonymous, Gallica, bibliothèque numérique.

Johann von Nassau-Siegen, meanwhile, found some French troops and began to withdraw in disorder. La Force immediately sent his cavalry and some musketeers under Comte d'Arpajoux to harass the rear-guard of the Count. The Spanish cavalry was in danger of being disbanded for a moment, but a sleeve of musketeers under Captain Don Antonio Pimentel, hidden in some hedges, managed to hold back the attack giving time to the Count to withdraw his troops. Pimentel was badly wounded in an arm, but he and his men managed to retreat because Arpajoux did not want to waste time finishing them and advanced towards Fort St. Jean. The retreat of the Count was soon noticed by Saavedra. Fearing that the relief force arrived on time, the Maestro de Campo sent his aid to ask Thomas of Carignano for permission to assault the fort, which was given.

The fort was taken by assault by 3 groups of 200 men led by Sargento mayor Porcell, Don Diego de Bohorquez and Mateo de Torres, and the Sargento mayor of the Regiment Rouvroy. Each group was provided of a scale and wood to fill the gap. After receiving orders to take no prisoners and with artillery support, the 3 groups attacked and climbed the parapets. The man who opened the march, Captain de Bohorquez, was wounded by a musket shot, but was able to continue commanding his soldiers. Sergeant Manuel Mudarra was the first officer who entered the fort, being followed by de Bohorquez, Mateo de Torres and Saavedra. The Maestre de Campo was shot twice, but was almost unscathed. An Irish captain and 6 soldiers were also wounded, and 2 Spaniards and a German died. The French soldiers, caught by surprise, could fire scarcely a shot. 135 were killed, a few managed to escape, and 4 were captured, among them a captain.

La Force's relief, finding the few men who had escaped the assault, stopped. The fort was garrisoned by 100 soldiers under Pedro de Sotomayor while another 300 remained in the outskirts until the arrival of Paolo Fanfanelli in command of Carlo Guasco's tercio. 200 Germans of the Regiment Rouvroy also entered the fort that day, being relieved the next day by Colonel Rouvroy and another 200 soldiers of his regiment. Saavedra and the remaining troops returned to Ruminghem, where the Maestro de Campo was congratulated by Thomas of Carignano and his staff. The following day a skirmish occurred near the fort when the troops under Comte d'Arpajoux tried to take it by assault. Rejected twice, they were engaged by a Spanish relief Force of 500 soldiers led by Maestre de Campo de Toralto. The battle lasted until the night, being Toralto's men relieved by another 500 Spaniards. Arpajoux was forced to retreat having lost, according to his enemies, about 800 men dead or wounded. The Spanish lost, according to their own accounts, 27 men dead or wounded.

=== Final relief ===
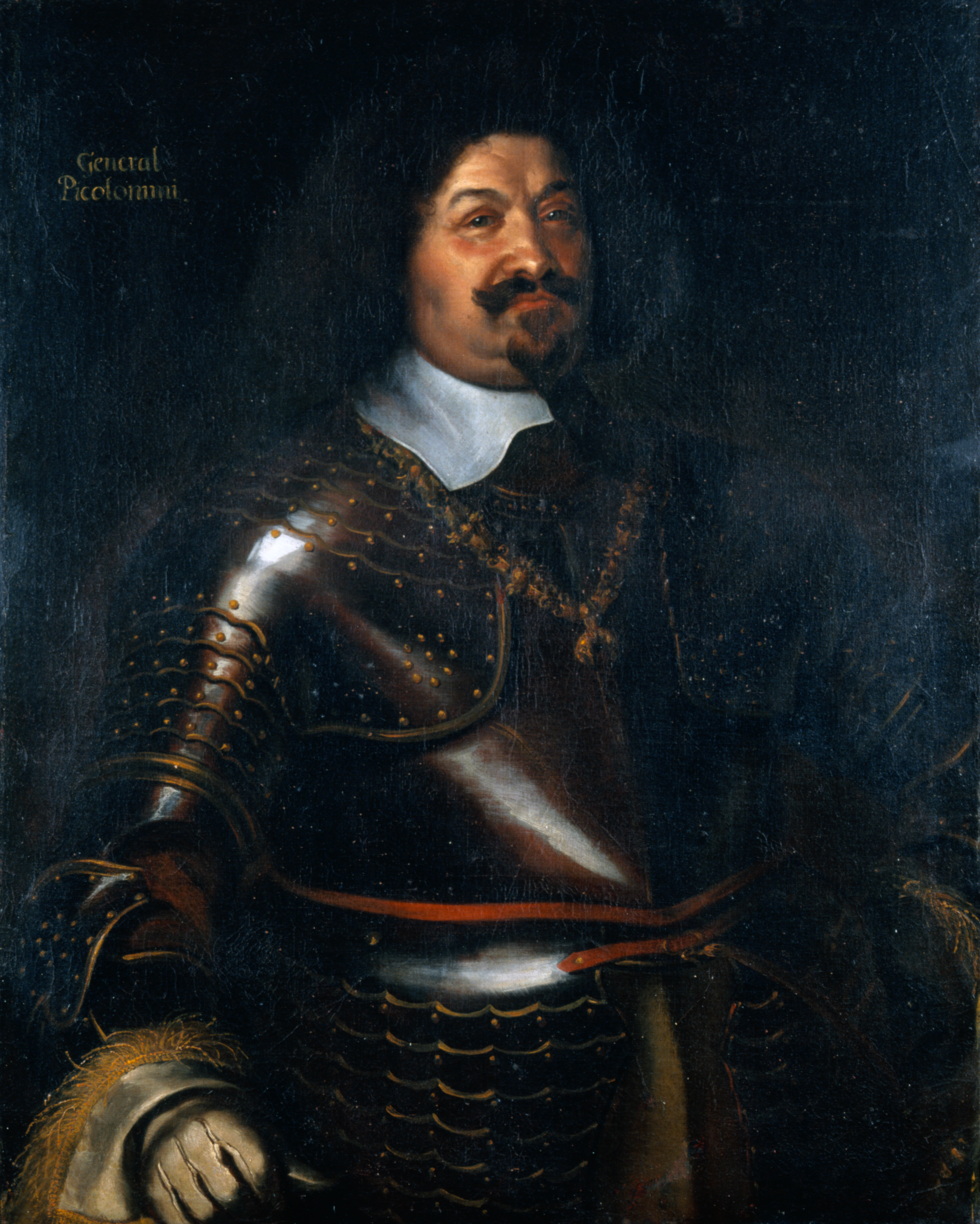
Portrait of Ottavio Piccolomini by Matthäus Merian.

The relief force would attack divided into two corps, one of them under the Thomas of Carignano, who would advance through the marshes in command of the Tercio de Velada, the Tercio de Guasco, that of Saavedra, Fuensaldaña, Toralto, the Regiment of Spinola and the Tercios of Tresham and Gage, plus some cavalry under Juan de Vivero, and the other under Piccolomini, who would attack Châtillon's main fortifications in Saint-Momelin and the fort of Bacq and its nearby redoubts. Most of the combined Imperial-Spanish cavalry was dispatched under the Count of Nassau-Siegen, Francisco Pardo, and the Imperial General Girolamo Colloredo to prevent La Force from joining his troops with Châtillon. Owen Roe O'Neill, with his own tercio and 3 companies of Wezemaal, would be embarked at Watten to capture a fort on the bank of the Aa river.

Châtillon, seeing that the extension of the lines of circumvallation made it difficult to garrison them with the troops that he had, sent Jean de Gassion to request La Force to enter the lines, which was accepted by La Force, who moved his army within the fortifications. He escorted, moreover, a supply convoy to the camp. The explorers of the contoy reported news of the advance of the Imperial-Spanish cavalry under Count von Nassau-Siegen and General Colloredo, whose strength was put in 4,000 men, through the levee of Hennin, near Ruminghem. Moreover, a French patrol guarding the area between Bacq and Du Hallier's quarter captured two disguised men attempting to reach the Spanish army, probably to inform them that the preparations into Saint-Omer were ready. Châtillon considered then important to garrison the levee which linked Bacq with Du Hallier's quarter, but it had been occupied by the Spanish shortly before.

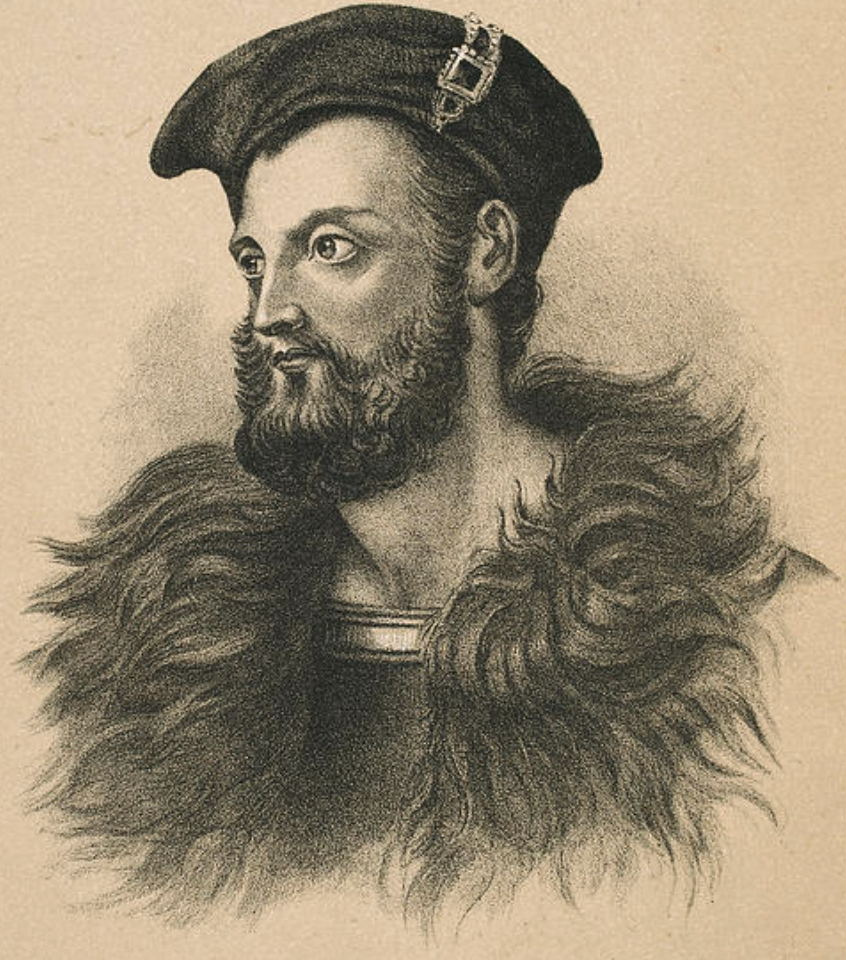
Owen Roe O'Neill, by J.T. Gilbert.

The French had three forts defending the levee from the marshes of Nieuerlet. The strongest had been named Niursote and was defended by 600 soldiers, but surrendered at the first assault by the Tercio of Fuensaldaña and the Regiment of Spinola, during which two captains of Fuensaldaña, Don Pedro de Cepeda and Don Diego de Velasco, were killed. A second fort, known as Esquenque, surrendered to Francesco de Toralto, allowing its garrison of 600 men to return to their army because the lack of ammunitions prevented them to organize a determined resistance. Aware if the loss of the forts, Châtillon sent the Comted'Avaguour in command of 500 men of the Regiment de Navarre and 500 of the Regiment de Molandiu to recover them. Fuensaldaña's musketeers and four sleeves of Velada and Saavedra dispatched by the Prince rejected the counter-attack inflicting serious losses to the French. Marquis de La Barre, Lieutenant-General of artillery, and Captain Angerville were killed, and the Lieutenant-colonel Fontenay-Coup-d'Épée was wounded.

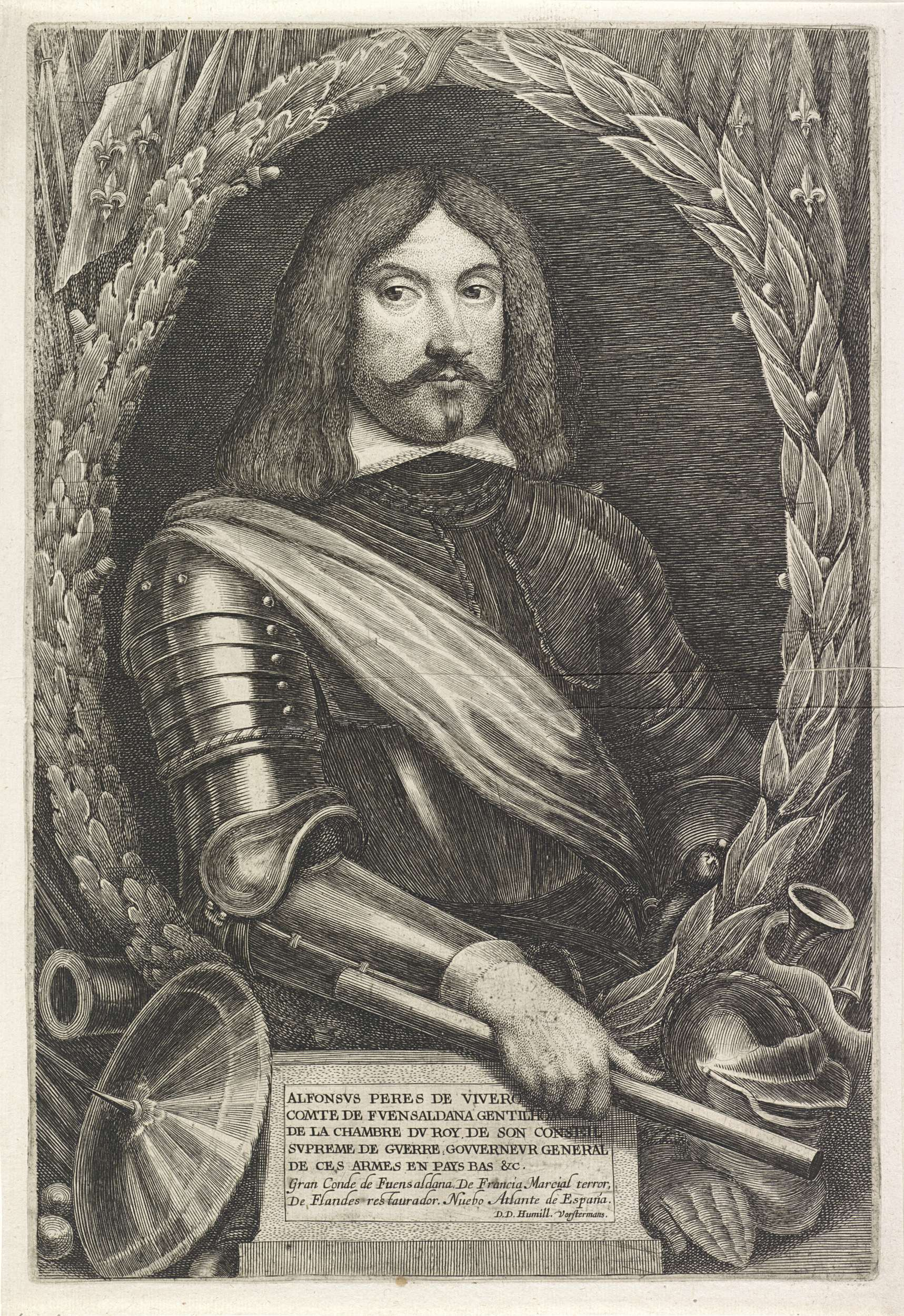
Engraving of Alfonso Pérez de Vivero, Count of Fuensaldaña, by Lucas Vorsterman.

Alerted by the proximity of the relief force, La Force put his army in battle, and giving the command of his right wing to the Comte d'Arpajoux, advanced to confront the Count of Nassau-Siegen and Colloredo. 400 Croatian riders were found in the field, but they promptly retreated behind the hedges of Polincove, where the Imperial-Spanish cavalry was disposed for battle. As soon as the Regiments of Piémont and de la Marine under Compte d'Arpajoux had passed the hedges, the Imperial-Spanish cavalry, forming in 12 squadrons, attacked them with great fierceness. The French infantry hold back the attack and fired a discharge which forced the Count and Colloredo to retreat. La Force sent then his cavalry to break the formation of his enemies and put them to flight. The Imperial-Spanish cavalry withdrew through the levee of Hennin. About 900 men were drowned or captured while attempting to escape. On the French side, Sieurs des Roches and Saint-Quentin and the Marquis de La Trousse were killed; Sieur de Maroles was wounded, and the Marquis de Fors was captured. The Imperial commander, General Colloredo, died of his wounds in Fort St. Jean shortly after.

Piccolomini, meanwhile, had taken a redoubt by assault and was attacking the Church of Saint-Momelin, and Owen Roe O'Neill had captured the French outpost in the riverside near Watten, which allowed him to introduce supplies into Saint-Omer with the help of an officer sent from the town. Châtillon, who had promised King Louis XIII to take Saint-Omer, then found it necessary to prevent the Spanish from capturing Bacq by attacking them with the command of all his infantry and cavalry except a reserve corps of 4,500 infantry and 1,500 cavalry that would remain in the rear to protect the supplies and the baggage. This decision was not welcomed by some officers, but Châtillon was determined to continue the siege, and his orders were sent to the field officers. The following day, however, it was found that Prince Thomas' positions were too strong to launch a potentially successful attack through the marshes, and it was called off. Du Hallier proposed that Châtillon move the artillery and baggage of Bacq to the Fort du Roi, but the French marshall refused and dispatched a force of 4,000 infantry and cavalry to guard the passage of Arcq, thus maintaining Bacq connected to the main army.

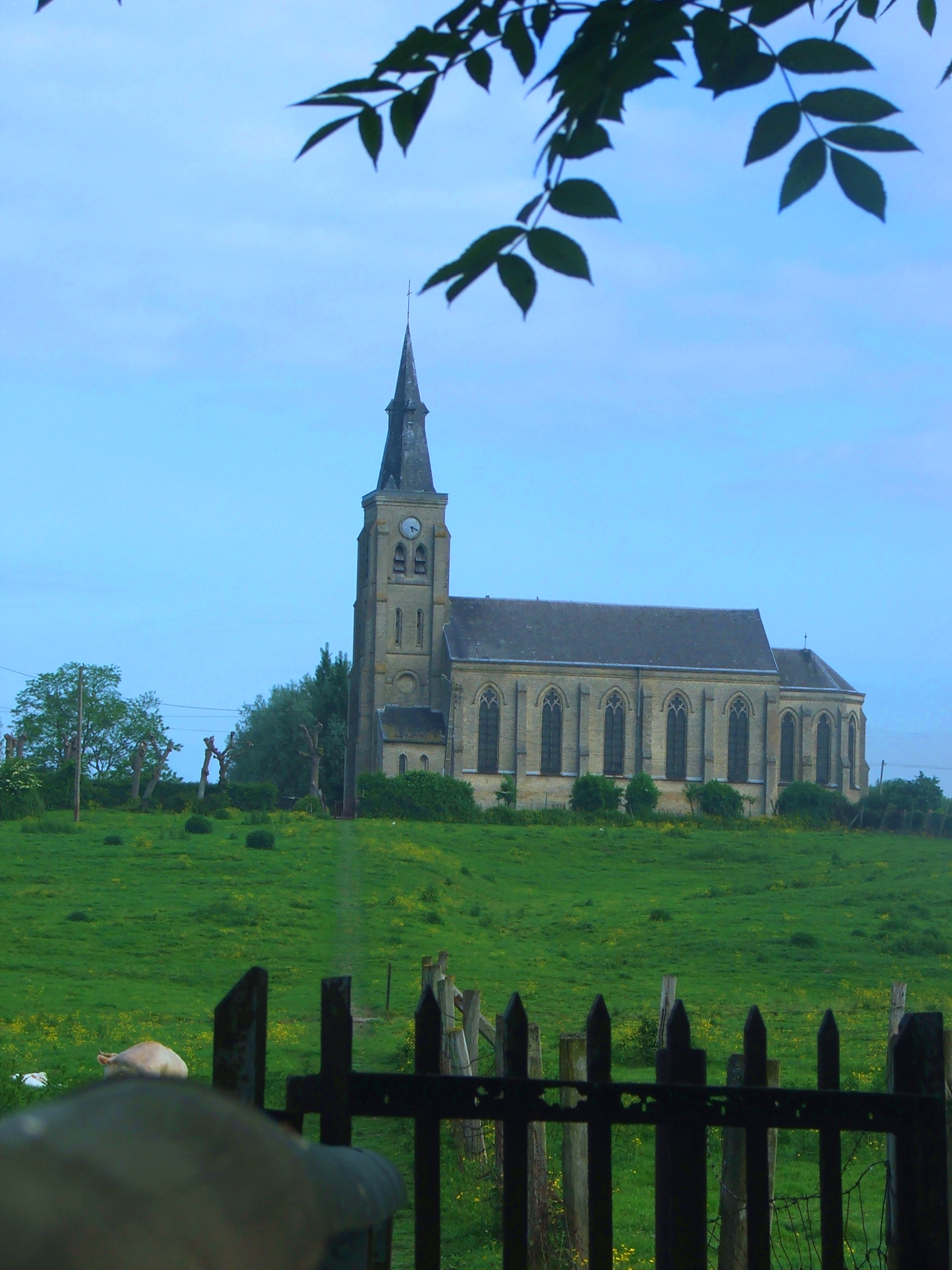
The church of Saint-Momelin.

The Prince of Carignano had finally relieved Saint-Omer, where he met the Baron of Wezemaal, Lancelot of Grobbendonk, and was informed by Piccolomini's envoy, the Marquis of Gonzaga, that the garrison of Saint Momelin had offered its surrender, which he accepted. Thomas, whose main goal was by then to capture the Fort of Bacq, dispatched that night Colonel Ludovico and his Croatian cavalry to recognize Châtillon's maneuvers. They captured a French convoy coming from Ardres and took some prisoners that stated that Châtillon would not lift the siege while he kept Bacq. As Piccolomini hadn't managed yet to invest in the fort due to the resistance of the garrison of Saint-Momelin, the Prince dispatched over the fort José de Saavedra in command of 1,000 Spaniards and Franceso de Toraldo with 1,000 Italians, Germans, and English.

Bacq was defended by 2,000 soldier under the Sieur de Manican, who had been encouraged by Châtillon to hold back the Spanish in the previous days. Having rejected three assaults by Piccolomini, nevertheless, when the Spanish Tercios jumped into the moat to launch their assault, he surrendered the fort under the condition of being safely returned to France, which was accomplished by the Spanish, who returned him with his troops to Metz, where he was arrested to be imprisoned at Amiens for surrender the fort.

== Aftermath ==
Despite receiving food from the Spanish, half of the troops died before reaching Messières. The loss of Bacq compelled Châtillon to lift the siege. On 17 July the camp was left and the army retreated to Fervaques. Simultaneously, the Spanish soldiers were ordered to return each one to his tercio, and the following day the army marched to Térouanne led by the Prince himself, who reviewed the troops before he went to Brussels to inform the Cardinal-Infante of his success.
