= Siege of 's-Hertogenbosch (1601) =

1601 siege

- Part of the Eighty Years' War and the Anglo-Spanish War (1585–1604)
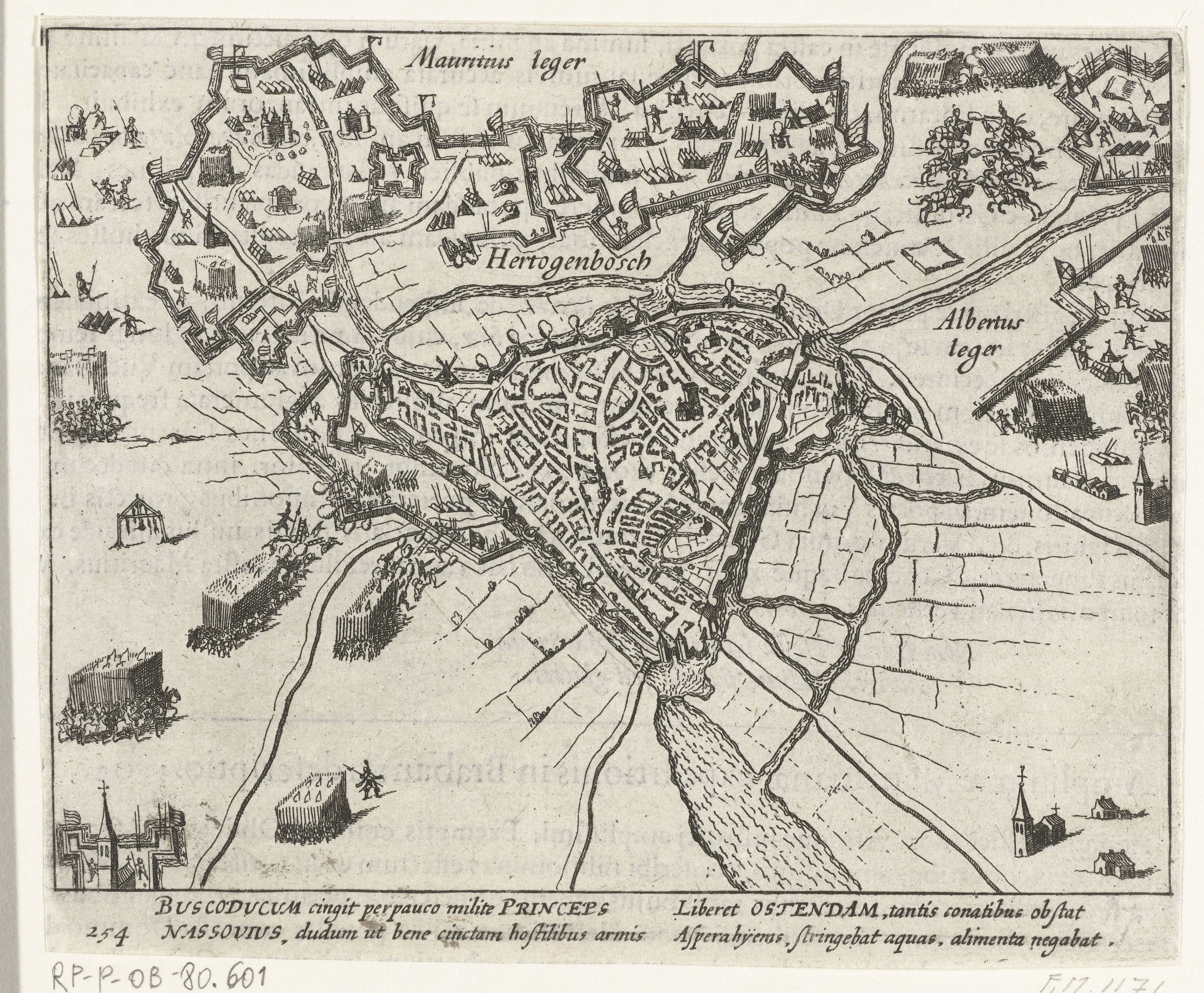
- Map of the siege of 's-Hertogenbosch by Simon Frisius.
Date	1–27 November 1601
Location	's-Hertogenbosch, North Brabant (present-day Netherlands) 51°42′00″N 5°19′00″E
Result	Spanish victory

Belligerents
Dutch Republic; England	Spain

Commanders and leaders
(Dutch Republic) Maurice of Nassau (Dutch Republic) William Louis of Nassau-Dillenburg	(Habsburg Spain) Anthonie Schetz (Habsburg Spain) Frederik van den Bergh

Strength
12,000–15,000; 22 guns	Anthonie Schetz: 2 infantry companies and 2 cavalry companies Frederik van den Bergh: 7,000 infantry and 1,500 cavalry
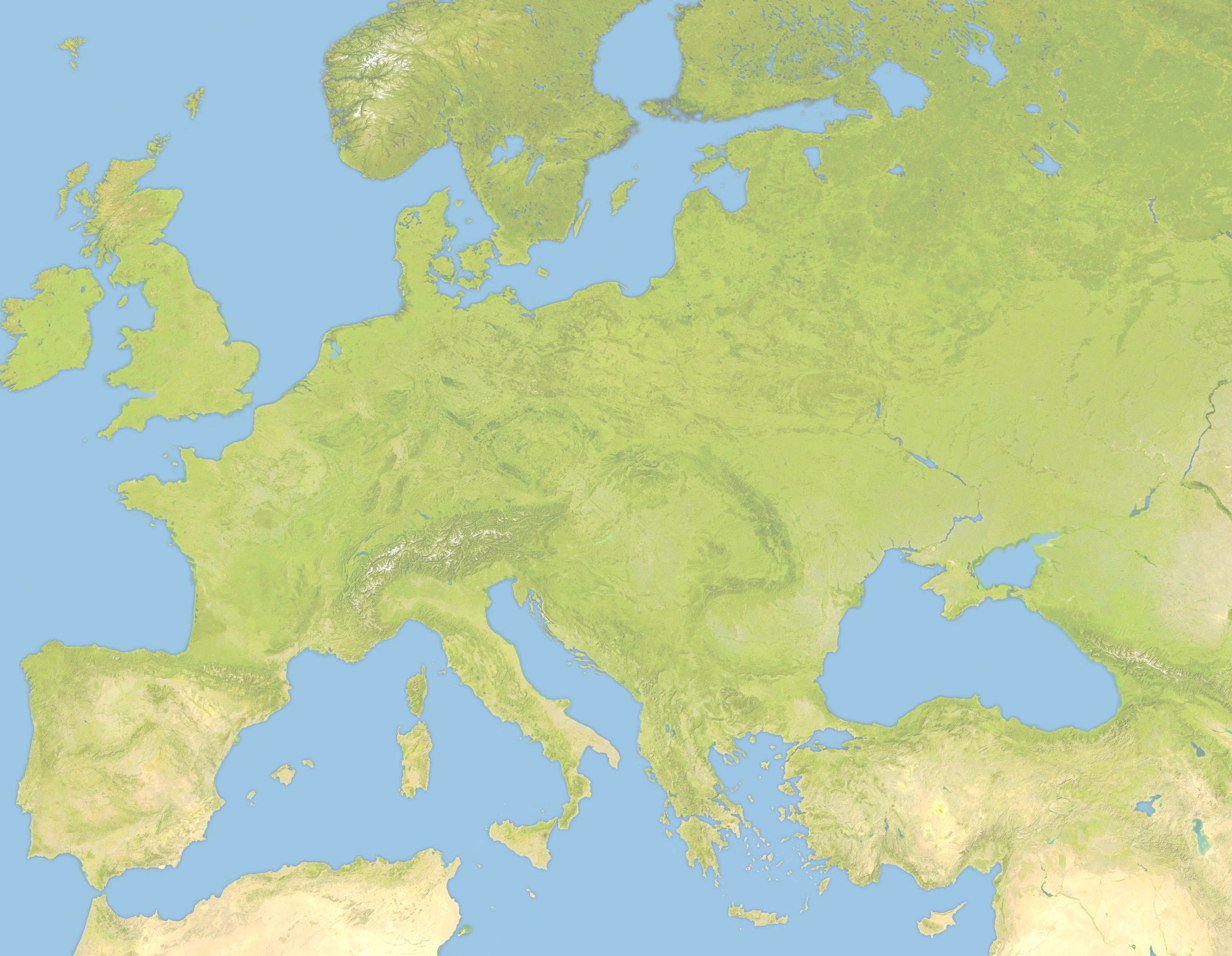
- Location within Netherlands Siege of 's-Hertogenbosch (1601) (Europe without the extreme north)

The siege of 's-Hertogenbosch of 1601 (Sitio de Bolduque de 1601 in Spanish) was an unsuccessful Dutch attempt led by Prince Maurice of Nassau and William Louis of Nassau-Dillenburg to capture the city of 's-Hertogenbosch, North Brabant, Spanish Netherlands, garrisoned by about 1,500–2,000 Spanish soldiers (2 infantry companies and 2 cavalry companies) led by Governor Anthonie Schetz, Baron of Grobbendonck, between 1 and 27 November 1601, during the Eighty Years' War and the Anglo-Spanish War (1585–1604), in the context of the long and bloodiest siege of Ostend.

After having captured Rheinberg in July 1601, Prince Maurice in October mobilized seventy-three companies of infantry and thirty-three companies of cavalry, including several pieces of artillery. The city was virtually impregnable due to the great defensive fortifications, the continuous arrival of fresh Spanish reinforcements, and the deep loyalty of the population to the Catholic cause. The fierce cold was another important point. The siege ended when the Archduke Albert, Governor-General of the Spanish Netherlands, sent a Spanish relief force under Count Frederik van den Bergh from Ostend, who on 27 November had reached the town of Oirschot, some 25 km south of 's-Hertogenbosch. A day before, on 26 November, Prince Maurice, according with his cousin William Louis about the threat and danger to facing the Spaniards in open field, started the withdrawal.

This Dutch failure was also an attempt to weaken the Spanish attacks in Ostend, where Sir Francis Vere (the commander of the garrison of Ostend at that time) was by now close to despair.

In 1603, Maurice of Nassau again tried to conquer 's-Hertogenbosch, but again was forced to withdraw.

== See also ==
- Battle of Nieuwpoort
- Siege of Ostend
- Siege of Lingen (1605)
- List of governors of the Spanish Netherlands
