= Ignace Schetz de Grobbendonk =

Ignatius Augustinus Schetz de Grobbendonk
- Bishop of Ghent
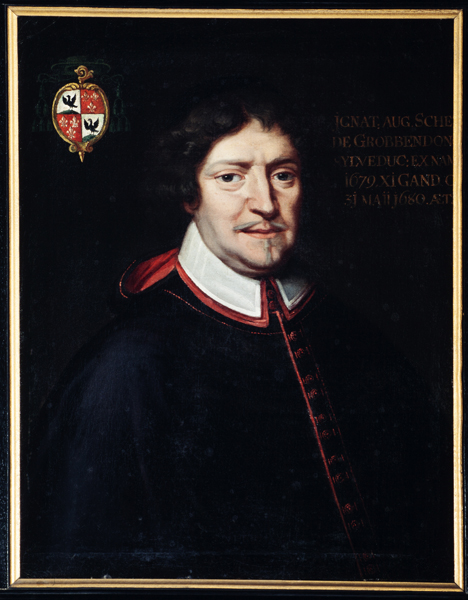
- Portrait of Mgr. Ignacius Augustinus Schetz de Grobbendonck
- Native name: Ignace Augustin Schetz
- Diocese: Ghent
- See: St Bavo's
- In office: 1679–1680
- Predecessor: Frans van Horenbeke
- Successor: Albert de Hornes
- Previous posts: Bishop of Namur, 1669–1679

Orders
- Consecration: 12 May 1669

Personal details
- Born: 1625 's-Hertogenbosch, Duchy of Brabant, Spanish Netherlands
- Died: 31 May 1680 (aged 54–55) Ghent, County of Flanders, Spanish Netherlands
- Buried: St Bavo's Cathedral, Ghent
- Parents: Anthonie Schetz and Maria van Malsen
- Education: canon and civil law
- Motto: In labore quies
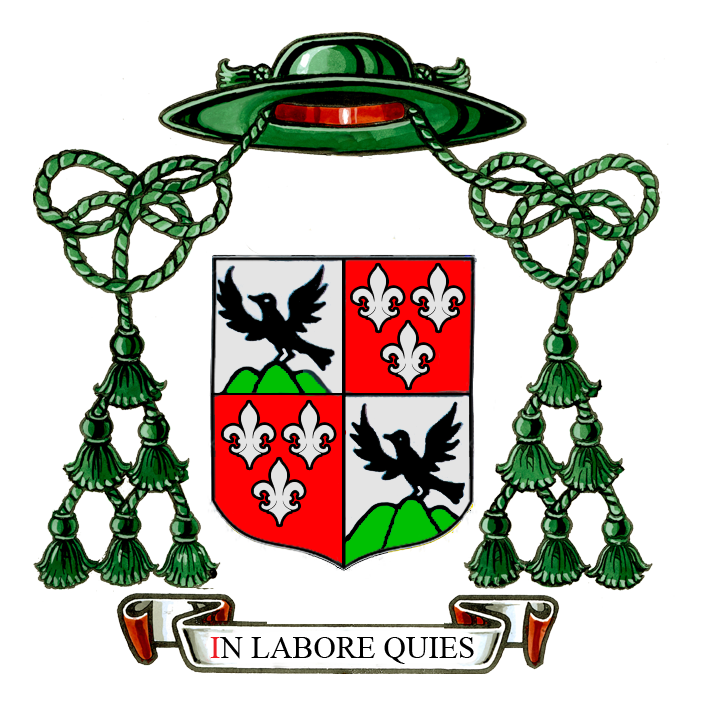
- Coat of arms

Ignacius Augustinus Schetz de Grobbendonk (1625–1680) was the 9th Bishop of Namur and the 11th Bishop of Ghent.

== Life ==
Schetz de Grobbendonck was a son of Anthonie II Schetz and his second wife Maria van Malsen, lady of Tilburg. After graduating licentiate of civil and canon law, he was appointed in 1647 to a canonry of Tournai Cathedral. His older sister was abbess of La Cambre. He went on to serve as archdeacon and vicar general of Tournai.

In 1666 he was named bishop of Roermond, but never took possession of the see, being named instead to the diocese of Namur the following year. He was consecrated bishop in Antwerp on 12 May 1669. In 1679 he was translated to Ghent, dying there on 31 May 1680. He was buried in his cathedral.

== See also ==
- Catholic Church in Belgium

Catholic Church titles
Preceded by Eugène, Count d'Allamont	Bishop of Roermond (nominated 1666)	Succeeded by Lancelot de Gottignies
Preceded by Jean de Wachtendonck	Bishop of Namur; 1669–1679	Succeeded by Pierre Vandenperre
Preceded by Frans van Horenbeke	Bishop of Ghent; 1679–1680	Succeeded by Albert de Hornes
