= Conrad III Schetz =

Conrad van Ursel 1st Baron of Hoboken
- Conrad III Schetz de Grobbendonck
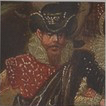

Ambassador to England
- In office 1604–1609
- Monarchs: Archdukes Albert and Isabella

Personal details
- Born: 19 March 1553 Antwerp, Duchy of Brabant
- Died: 16 July 1632 (aged 79) Brussels
- Spouse(s): Françoise Grusset dict Richardot, daughter of Jean Richardot
- Relations: Anthonie Schetz (brother)
- Parent(s): Gaspar Schetz and Catharina d'Ursel
- Education: civil law
- Alma mater: Leuven University

Conrad (or Coenraad) Schetz de Grobbendonck, later Conrad d'Ursel (1553–1632) was a nobleman in the Habsburg Netherlands and in 1604–1609 the first ordinary ambassador to England for the Archdukes Albert and Isabella.

== Ursel family ==
The 5th son of Gaspard II Schetz and Catharina d'Ursel, daughter of Lancelot II of Ursel, he was baptised in Antwerp on 19 March 1553. His parents had 21 children in total, eight of whom survived to adulthood. He was the fifth son. His father was the chief banker in Antwerp, financing several merchants who traded to Russia and Brazil, as well as being banker to Philip II of Spain, which gave him a political role and made him a leading figure in the Antwerp of the second half of the 16th century.

In 1617 he inherited the estates of his aunt, Barbara of Ursel, last heir of Lancelot II, on the condition that he and his heirs in perpetuity change their name and coat of arms to d'Ursel.

=== Descendants ===
- Conrad, 1st Count of Ursel, 2nd Baron of Hoboken, Vicomte of Vives-St-Eloy, Zennegem, Oostkamp, Lord of Highene, Lord of Rumst, Lord of Opdorp, Lord of Beernem, Grand Forrestier of Flanders and became a Count of the Holy Roman Empire in 1638. Married to Anne Maria de Robles. Died 1659.
  - Francois, 2nd Count of Ursel, 3rd Baron of Hoboken and Grand Forrestier of Flanders, married to Honorine Maria Dorothea, Princess of Horne.
    - Conrad-Albert, 1st Duke d'Ursel, 1st Duke of Hoboken, married to Eleonora von Salm

== Career ==
In his youth Conrad was engaged in mercantile affairs, but in 1582 he obtained a government position as councillor and commissioner extraordinary for Domains and Finances. In 1584 he was appointed comptroller of artillery, and in 1587 superintendent of munitions in fortified places. 1587 was also the year that Conrad married Françoise, the daughter of Jean Richardot, president of the Brussels Privy Council. In 1588 he was knighted and became an ordinary councillor of the Council of Finance in Brussels.

In 1600 he was created Baron Hoboken, and in 1604 appointed archducal ambassador to England. He remained in this post until 1609. His wife Françoise Grusett, Madame de Hoboken, had an audience with Anne of Denmark at Hampton Court in October 1605. They resided at Stepney.

In 1632 he, alongside the Duke of Aarschot, represented the nobility of Brabant in the Estates General.

== Ancestors ==
Ancestors of Conrad III Schetz

8. Conrad I Schetz
4. Erasmus II Schetz
9. Maria Krantz
2. Gaspard II Schetz, Lord of Grobbendonk
10. Johan IV de Cock van Opijnen
5. Catherine de Cock van Opinen
11. Elisabeth of Berthout
1. Conrad III Schetz , 1st Baron of Hoboken
12. John III of Ursel
6. Lancelot II of Ursel
13. Maria Pots
3. Catharina van Ursel
14. Guillaume de Liere
7. Barbara van Lier-Immerseel
15.

Belgian nobility
Preceded by Balthazar II Schetz	1st Baron of Hoboken; 1600-1632	Succeeded by Conrad, 1st Count of Ursel
Preceded by	Ambassador to England; 1604-1609	Succeeded by
