= Erasmus II Schetz =

Flemish nobleman (d. 1550)

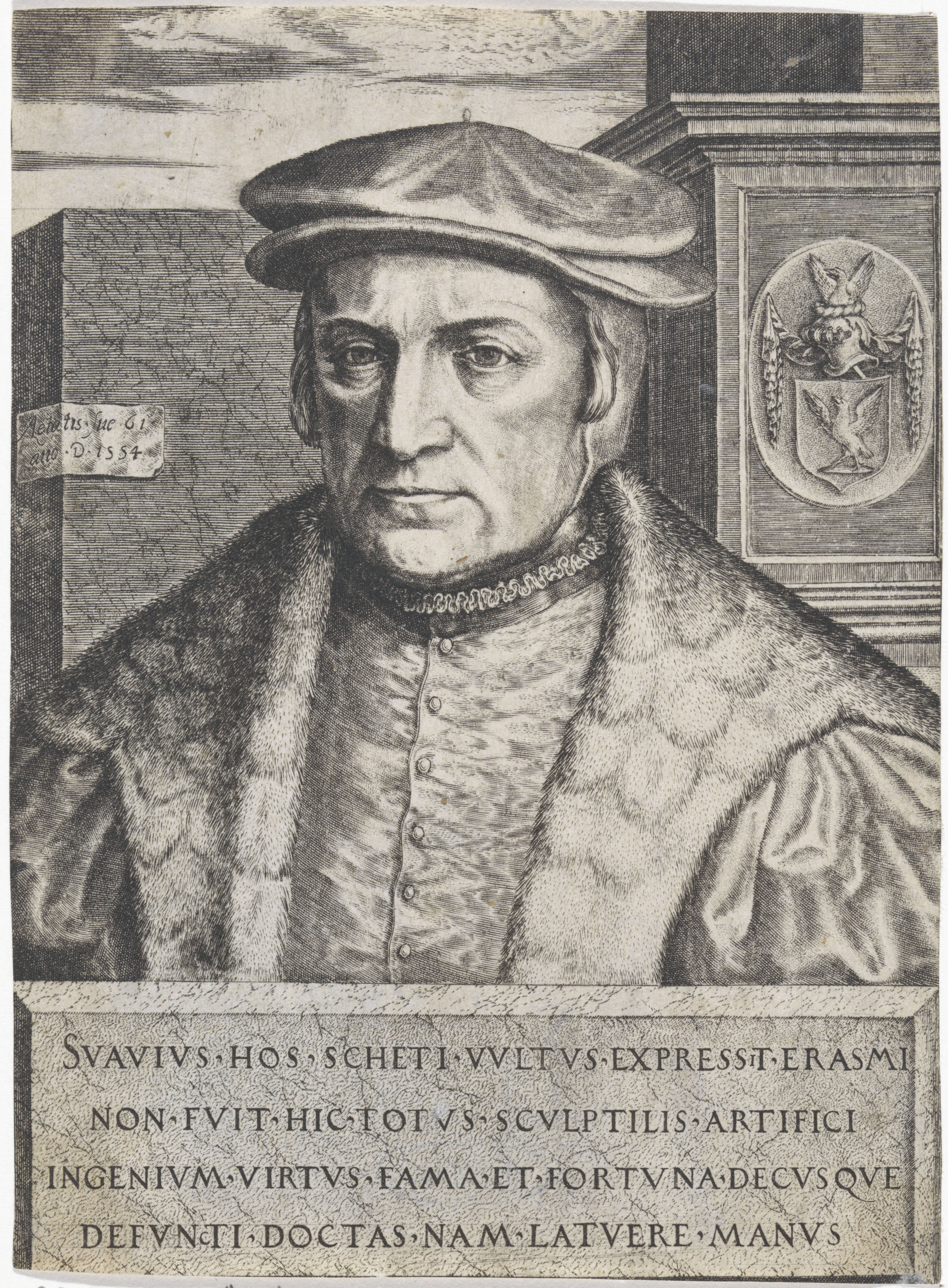
Portrait of Erasmus Schetz, engraved by Lambertus Suavius, 1554

Erasmus II Schetz, sometimes Scets (died 1550), was a Flemish nobleman.

== Lord of Grobbendonk ==
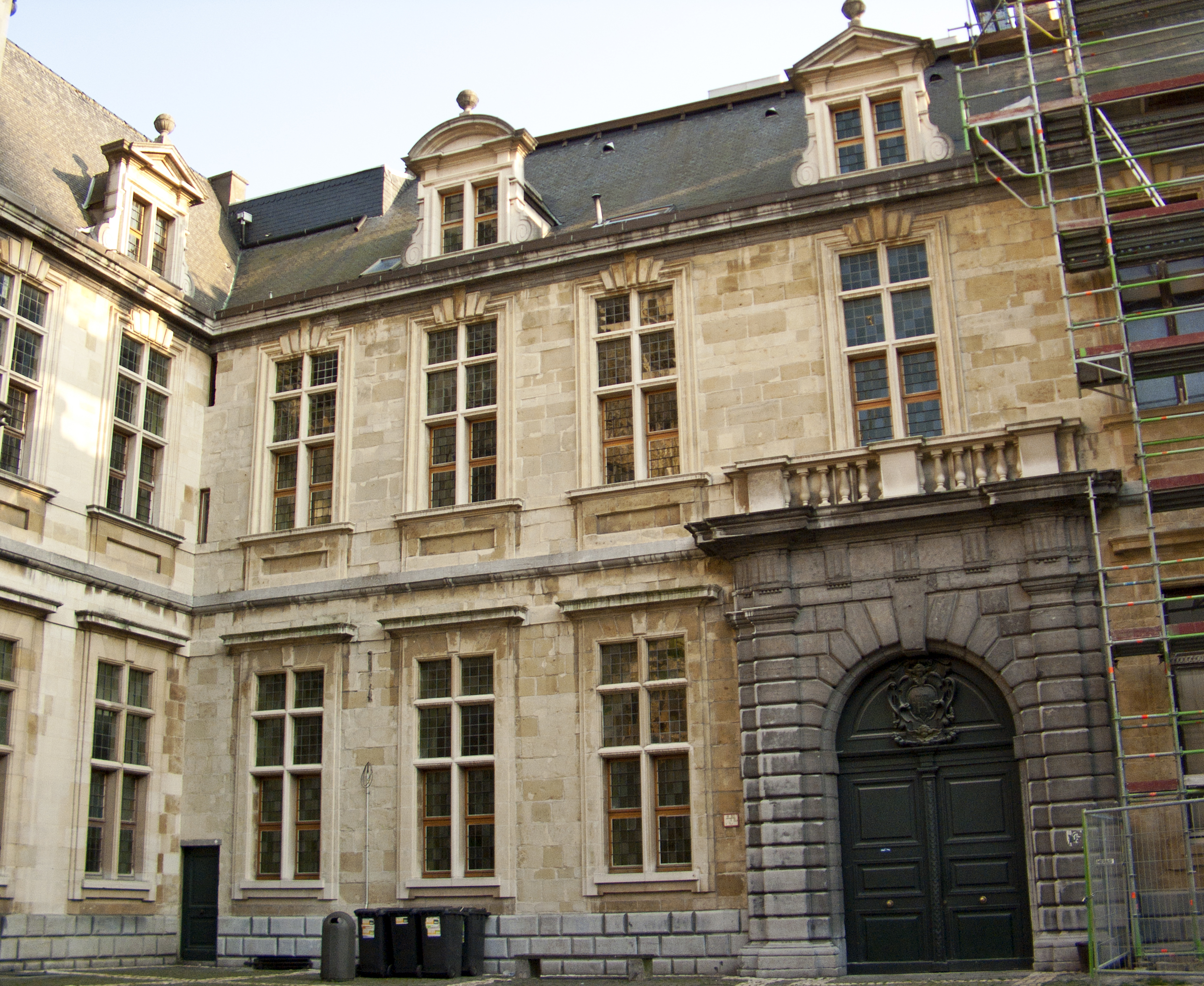
Huis van Aecken

He was born as son of Conrad I Schetz who married in 1485 to Maria Crans di Roscara, daughter of Mathieu Roscara. He lived in Maastricht, and came to Antwerp for financial reasons.

He acquired the Heerlijkheid of Grobbendonk on the 3 Juny 1545, he paid it from Philippe, Lord of Jauche. His descendants are known as Schetz de Grobbendonk, when it became a barony in 1602. He married Ida of Rechtergem, daughter of a wealthy calamine trader in Aachen. They had 4 sons, three of them named after the Three wise men.

His fortune was immense, he had a residence called Huis van Aken, heritage (1534) of his father in law. He had the house extended into a small palace where Emperor Charles V visited in 1545. After the death of Erasmus, the house was sold in 1575. The heirs decided to lower the price : Gaspard gifted 500 Ducats reduction to the Jesuits. The final amount paid was 17.000 ducats to the heirs of Erasmus. Next to this house the Jesuits built later the Carolus Borromeuskerk.

Around 1540, he acquired Engenho dos Erasmos, a sugar cane facility at São Vicente Island in present day Brazil.

His son Gaspard attended the University of Marburg, and studied with Eobanus Hessus.

== Descendants ==
His three sons were together one of the most important factors of Antwerp, their wealth was so vast the future generations could benefit from this.

1. Gaspard II Schetz (1513-1580) : died 1580: Lord of Hoboken since 1559, Grobbendonk and Hinghene.
2. Melchior I Schetz, (1516-1577) : Lord of Rumst, Royal treasurer of Antwerp. Married to Joanna van Straelen. and became the brother in law of Anthony van Stralen, Lord of Merksem.
3. Balthasar I Schetz, (1520-1586): Lord of Hoboken in 1545. Marr. to Margherete van Straelen.
4. Conrard Schetz (1527-1577), Marr. to Maria of Brimeu, mentioned in plantarum seu stirpium historia daughter of Jacques, Lord of Poederlee in 1536. Had two daughters.
  1. Julianne Schetz, married to Robrecht Tucher, knight and Lord mayor of Antwerp.
5. Maria Schetz
6. Isabeau Schetz
7. Joanne Schetz, Lady Pallavicini.
