= House of Glyme =

(de) Glymes de Glymes-Berghes
- Country: Spanish Netherlands Austrian Netherlands
- Founder: Jan Cordeken, Lord of Glymes
- Titles: Lords of Glymes; Lords of Bergen-op-Zoom; Lords of la Falize; Princes of Grimberghen
- Estates: Grimberghen Castle; La Falize Castle; Feluy Castle; Walhain Castle
- Cadet branches: Glymes-Brabant (+); Glymes-Hollebecque (+)

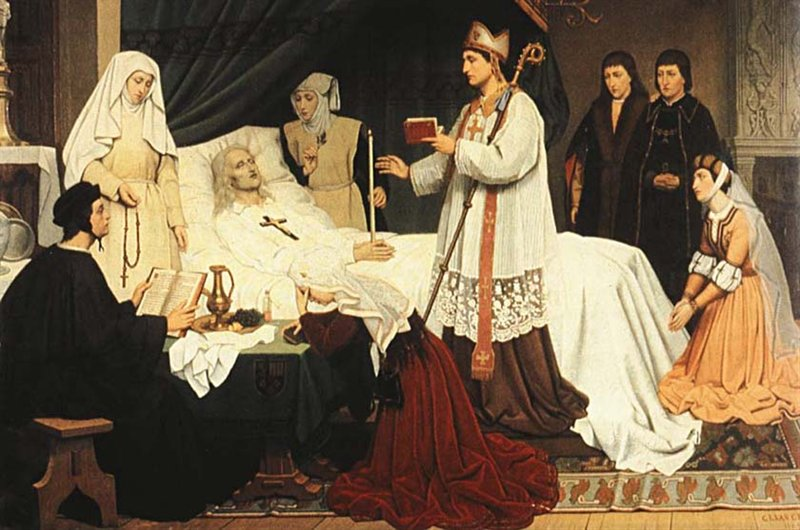
Death of John II of Glymes, lord of Berghen

The House of Glymes was an old Belgian noble family, an illegitimate branch of the House of Reginarid, which ruled the Duchy of Brabant. Glymes or Glimes is a municipality of Incourt. Their descendants of the Grimberghen branch held the title Prince de Grimberghen.

== History ==
The house was founded by Jan Cordeken, Lord of Glymes, illegitimate son of John II, Duke of Brabant. It was legitimized by Emperor Louis IV. John I obtained Bergen by marriage to Joanne of Boutersem. The house died out when the descendants of Henri Nicolas de Glymes de Hollebecque (1755–-1813) died without heirs.

The oldest generations called themselves in French de Glymes or in Dutch van Glimes. The younger branch of the Lords, Counts and Princes of Grimbergen called themselves in French de Berghes.

The family had many important possessions: since 1559 they were the Margraves of Bergen op Zoom, in French Berghes-sur-le-Zoom. Other notable possessions are: Florennes, Glimes, Grimberghen, Zevenkercke, Bierbais, Opprebais, Walhain, la Falize, ...

There were several canons, abbesses and three bishops of Cambrai, a bishop of Antwerp and Prince-Bishop of Liege amongst the clergy of this family.

== Descendants of John I, Lord of Bergen op Zoom ==
1. John II of Glymes, (1417–1494): marr. to Margaretha of Rouveroy.
  1. John III of Glymes (1452–1532): knight of the Golden Fleece, married to Adriana de Brimeu.
    1. John of Glymes, (1489–1514): killed in a duel.
    2. Anna of Glymes, (1492–1541): married Adolf of Burgundy.
      1. Maximilian II of Burgundy, married to Louise of Croÿ, daughter of Philippe II de Croÿ.
    3. Adriana of Glymes, (1495–1524): married Philip I, Count of Nassau-Wiesbaden-Idstein.
      1. Philip II, Count of Nassau-Wiesbaden
    4. Philip of Glymes, (1498–1525)
    5. Anthony of Glymes, (1500–1541): married to Jacqueline of Croÿ.
      1. Robert of Glymes, died 1565: prince-bishop of Liège.
      2. John IV of Glymes, (1528)
  2. Cornelis of Glymes, married to Maria Margaretha van Strijen, daughter of Arend, Lord of Zevenbergen.
    1. Margareth of Glymes, married to Floris van Egmont.
      1. Maximiliaan van Egmond
      2. Anna van Egmont the Elder, marr. to Count Jan van Horne (1470/75–1540).
        1. Philip de Montmorency, Count of Horn, victim of the Inquisition in the Spanish Netherlands.
    2. Marie of Glymes, Lady of Zevenbergen (1503–1566): married Louis de Ligne, Baron of Barbançon.
      1. Jean de Ligne
        1. Charles de Ligne, 2nd Prince of Arenberg
    3. Maximilian of Glymes (†1522)
    4. Leonard of Glymes (†1523)
    5. Cornelis II of Glymes, died 1560: Prince Bishop of Liège (1538–1544)

== Lords of la Falize ==
This branch inherited by marriage La Falize Castle. The descendants of Antoine of Glymes, Lord of Limettes and his 3rd wife Anne of Hosden, Lady of La Falize are named Glymes-Brabant. Their descendants moved to Spain, and made a successful career at the Spanish court; amongst them Honoré-Ignace de Glymes-Brabant who was in 1765 Viceroy of Navarra.

Antoine of Glymes; married to Anne, Lady of La Falize.

  1. Gilles I of Glymes, Lord of La Falize;
    married to Joanne de Cerf.
    1. Warnier, Lord of La Falize;
      married to Marie-Elisabeth of Nassau-Corroy, granddaughter of Henry III of Nassau-Breda
      1. Gilles II Alexis de Glymes-Brabant; Lord of la Falize;
        married to Marie-Agnes de Campenne.
        1. Ignace-François de Glymes-Brabant, Lord of la Falize (1677-1755); Captain General of Catalonia.
          married to Marie-Françoise, daughter of the Marquess of Warigny.
          1. Honoré-Ignace de Glymes-Brabant (1725–1804); Viceroy of Navarre in 1765.
            married to Marie-Theodore, daughter of Charles I Emmanuel, 1st Prince de Gavre.
          2. Jean Alexis de Glymes-Brabant: Abbot in Dinant.

== Branch of Grimberghen ==
1. Philip of Glymes, (1420–1464): Lord of Grimbergen.
  Married to Joanne, Lady of Halmale.
  1. James of Glymes, died 1486: Lord of Grimbergen.
    married to Elisabette de Boschuysse.
    1. Georges of Glymes, died 1541:
      married to Philippotte de 't Serclaes
      1. Peter de Glymes, (+1582)
      2. Jean de Glymes, (+1555):
        Canon of Liège Cathedral.
      3. Jerome de Glymes, died 1575:
        Abbot of the Benedictine Abbey of St. Winoc,
      4. Marguerite de Glymes
      5. Ferry de Glymes-Berghes, Baron of Grimberghen:
        Married to Anne de Stercke, Lady of Sterckshof
        1. Georges de Berghes
        2. Gérard de Berghes, Lord of Stabroeck.
          Married to Anne de Halmale
          1. Goderfoi de Glymes, 1st Count of Grimberghen.
        3. Guillaume de Berghes,
          Dean at the Cathedral of Liege;
          Bishop of Antwerp.
        4. Jacques de Berghes, Baron of Grimberghen.
        5. Anne de Berghes,
          Noble Canonnesse of La Cambre Abbey.
        6. Margareta de Berghes, (1590–1637):
          Abbess of Herkenrode Abbey in 1620.
        7. Marie de Berghes.
        8. Joanna de Berghes:
          Married to John Bette, Baron of Lede.
          1. Guillaume de Bette, 1st marquess of Lede,
            married Anna Maria, countess of Horne.

=== Counts of Grimberghen ===
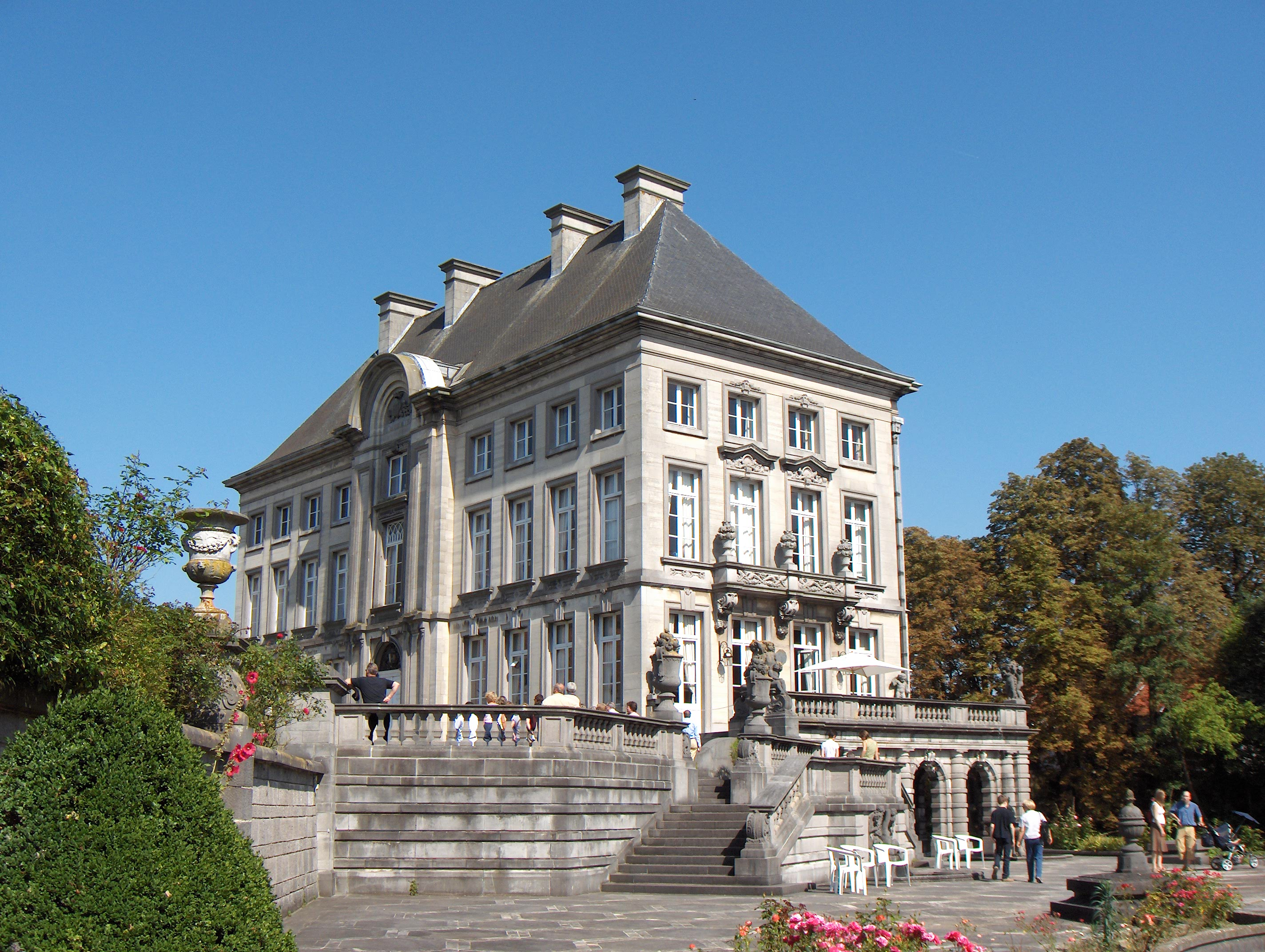
Feluy Castle; Residence of the Prince of Grimberghen

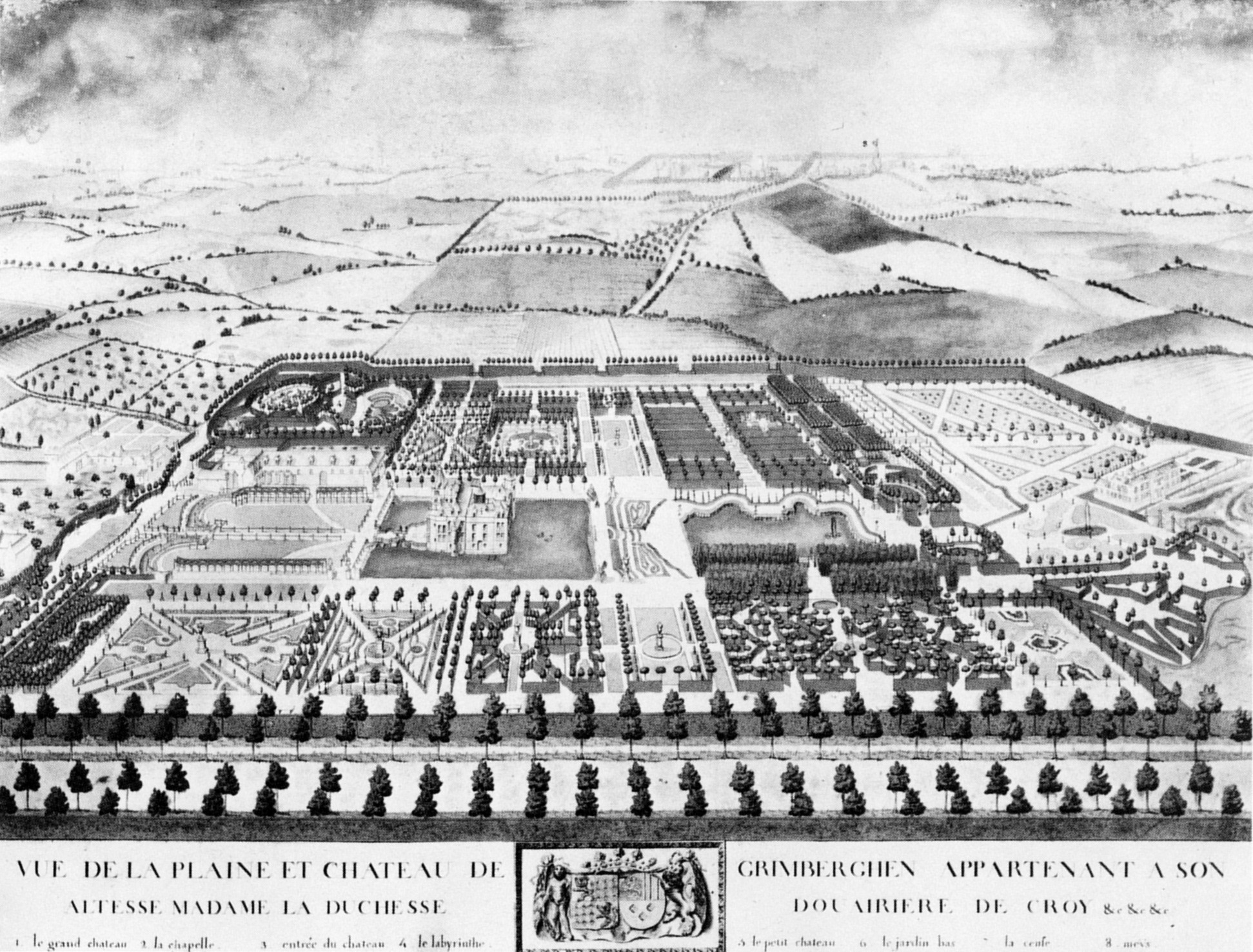
former Grimberghen Castle, engraving 18th century.

Godefroi de Glymes, 1st Count of Grimberghen, named de Berghes, died 1635, was the son of Gerard:
married to Horonina of Hornes, Lady of Arquennes.

  1. Eugene de Berghes, 2nd Count of Grimberghen:
    married Florence-Marguerite, daughter of René de Renesse, 1st Count of Warfusée.
    1. Philippe François de Berghes, 1st Prince of Grimberghen: Knight of the Golden Fleece,
      married to Marie-Jacques de Lalaing.
      1. Alphonse Dominique François de Berghes, 2nd Prince of Grimberghen, died 1721:
        Grande of Spain, 1st Class. Marr. Anne Henriette of Rohan-Chabot, daughter of Louis, Duke of Rohan.
      2. Charlotte de Berghes
      3. Magdeleine Marie de Berghes: marr. Louis de Luynes, 3rd Prince of Grimberghen.
    2. Georges-Louis de Berghes: Prince-Bishop of Liege.
    3. Anne Antoinette de Berghes: marr. Ferdinand Gaston, Duke of croy, Knight of the Golden Fleece.
    4. Honorine Alexandra de Berghes.
    5. Marie Caroline de Berghes: marr. Anthony III Ignace Schetz, 4th Count of Grobbendonck, son of Lancelot II Schetz, 2nd Count of Grobbendonk.
    6. Marie Francoise de Berghes: Noble canonnese and abbesse in Nivelles.
    7. Marie Elisabeth de Berghes, marr. Reginals, Count of Gournay.
  2. Alphonse de Berghes: Archbishop of Mechelen.
  3. Ignace de Berghes
  4. Honorine de Berghes
  5. Angeline de Berghes
  6. Marie de Berghes

== See also ==
- De Berghes-Saint-Winoc, a noble family in the north of France.
- Florennes Castle
- La Falize Castle
