= House of Brimeu =

Noble family

(de) Brimeu
- noble family
- D'argent, à trois aigles de gueules, 2 et 1 membrées et becquées d azur
- Country: Spanish Netherlands Austrian Netherlands
- Founder: Jean I of Brimeau
- Titles: Lords of Humbercourt; Lords of Poederlée; Counts of Meghem

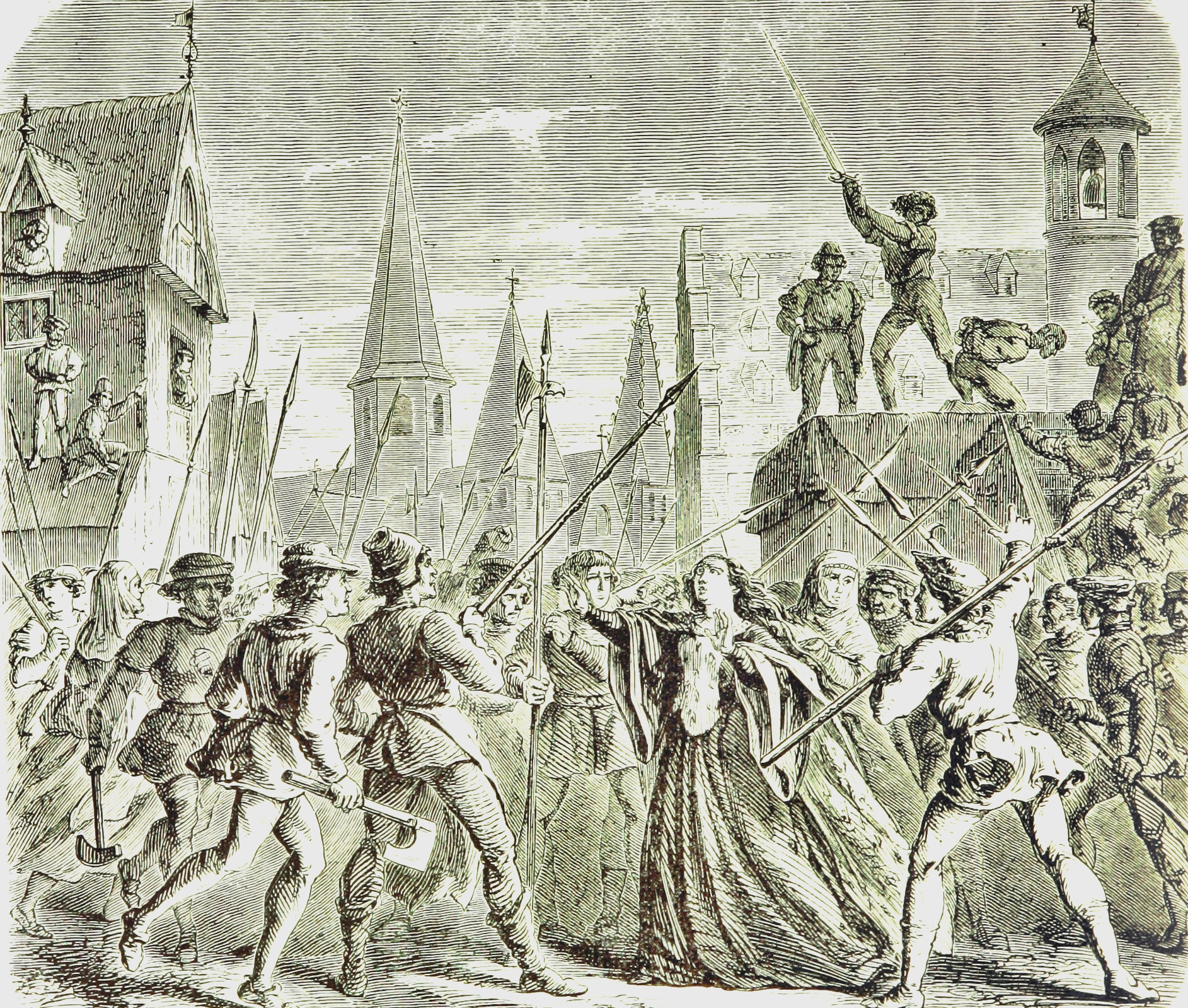
Execution of Guy of Brimeu, Ghent 1477

David I of Brimeu, Lord of Ligny

Brimeu is a noble family, some members belonging to the Flemish aristocracy. Brimeux, previously in Flanders, is now in France.

== History ==
The family originated from the county of Ponthieu. The oldest known member is Jean I of Brimeau, in whose memory his son, Jean II, knight, built a chapel in 1151.

Five members of the House of Brimeu were Knights of the Golden Fleece. Amongst the lands owned we find Humbercourt, Chaulnes, Poederlee, Ligny, Meghen and Wesemael. Charles of Brimeu sold Wesemael to Gaspar Schetz, and it became the property to the house of Ursel.

The last generations of the House of Brimeu, intermarried with important Flemish noble families like the houses of Glymes, Croy, Ursel, Schetz, Van de Werve, Snoy and Tucher von Simmelsdorf.

== Members ==
Guillaume I of Brimeu

  1. Louis of Brimeu, died in 1415 during the battle of Agincourt.
    1. Marguerite, Dame of Brimeu:
      married to Jean of Mélun.
  2. Guillaume II of Brimeu, Lord of Humbercourt.
    1. Denis of Brimeu, Lord of Humbercourt
      1. Colinet of Brimeu.
      2. Jean of Brimeu, Lord of Humbercourt: Governor of St Valery;
        Married to Mary of Mailly.
        1. Guy (Gui) de Brimeu, known as the great:
          knight of the Golden Fleece, (Note: Chevalier de la Toison' d'or l'an) by Charles Duke of Burgundy, beheaded in Ghent, 1476:
          married to Antonia de Rambures.
          1. Adrien de Brimeu, Lord of Humbercourt, Count of Meghem: Died in the Battle of Marignan, 1515.
          2. Eustache of Brimeu, Lord of Humbercourt, Count of Meghem;
            married Barbara of Hillery (daughter of François Baron de Hillery & Margaret of Austria)
            1. Charles de Brimeu, Lord of Humbercourt, Count of Meghem, knight of the Golden Fleece in 1556. Died without heirs.
            2. Georges de Brimeu, Lord of Quinry:
              married to Anne, daughter of the Count of Silen.
              1. Marie de Brimeu, Countess of Meghem, married:
                1st/ Lancelot of Berlaymont, Lord of Beaurain, son of Charles de Berlaymont, 1572
                2nd/ Charles III of Croÿ, 5th Prince of Chimay 1580; divorced in 1584.
              2. Marguerite de Brimeu;
                married Claude of Berlaimont.
          3. Anne (Adrienne) of Brimeu,;
            married to Jean de Berges (John III of Glymes, Knight of the Golden Fleece.)
            1. John of Glymes, (1489–1514): killed in a duel.
            2. Anna of Glymes, (1492–1541):
              married to Adolf of Burgundy.
              1. Maximilian II of Burgundy.
            3. Adriana of Glymes, (1495–1524): married Philip I, Count of Nassau-Wiesbaden-Idstein.
              1. Philip II, Count of Nassau-Wiesbaden
            4. Philip of Glymes, (1498–1525)
            5. Anthony of Glymes, (1500–1541): married to Jacqueline of Croÿ.
              1. Robert of Glymes, died 1565: prince-bishop of Liège.
              2. John IV of Glymes, (1528)
          4. Lamberte of Brimeu, married Ferry of Croy.
          5. Guyotte of Brimeu, n. Jean de Bos
    2. David I of Brimeu, Lord of Ligny, knight of the Golden Fleece: governor of Artois;
      married Joanne of Chastillon, daughter of James, Lord of Dampierre and Admiral of France.
    3. Florimond of Brimeu, Lord of Massincourt: Knight of the Golden Fleece.
    4. Jacques I of Brimeu, Lord of Grigny, died 1447: Knight of the Golden Fleece and esquire of Philip the Good.
    5. Archimbault of Brimeu, died in the Siege of Compiègne.
    6. Jean of Brimeu, married Marie de Bossye
      1. Jeanne of Brimeu

=== Branch of the Lords of Poederlée, (Poyelles) ===
Bastard branch descending of Garin of Brimeu.

Matthieu de Brimeu, son of Garin:
married Cornélie van Beerse.

  1. Peter de Brimeu:
    married Magdalene of Vriessele, Lady of Poederlee.
    1. Jacques de Brimeu, Lord of Poederlee:
      married Anna van de Werve, daughter of Martin.
      1. Maria of Brimeu, Lady of Poederlee:
        married Conrad II Schetz, son of Erasmus II Schetz, Lord of Grobbendoncq.
        1. Julianne Schetz: married Robrecht Tucher, knight and mayor of Antwerp.
    2. Philippine de Brimeu: married Michel van de Werve, Lord of Hovorst and Vierseldyck.
  2. Jean de Brimeu, Lord of Poederlee: married Clara of Thuyl (Claire Van Serooskercke).
    1. Charles de Brimeu, Lord of Poederlee
    2. Eleonora or Florentia de Brimeu, Lady of Poederlee:
      married Philip Snoy, Lord of Oppuers.
      1. Walburga Snoy, lady of Poederlee:
        married Philippe-Guillaume de Steenhuys, 1st Baron de Poederlé.

== Bibliography ==
- Blaes, Jean Baptiste François; Henne, Alexandre (1860). Mémoires anonymes sur les troubles des Pays-Bas 2.: 1565–1580. Heussner.
- Le Carpentier, Jean (1664). "Brimeu". Histoire généalogique des Païs-Bas, ou histoire de Cambray, et du Cambresis, contenant ce qui s'y est passé sous les empereurs, et les rois de France et d'Espagne; enrichie des généalogies, éloges, et armes des comtes, ... Le tout divisé en IV part. III (in French). pp. 325–329.
- Galesloot, Louis (1870). Inventaire des archives de la cour féodale de Brabant. I (in French). Brussels: Hayez.
- Roger, Paul (1843). "Brimeu". Noblesse et chevalerie du comté de Flandre, d'Artois et de Pacardie (in French). Duval et Herment. p. 229.
- De navorscher-Nederlands archief voor genealogie en heraldiek, heemkunde en geschiedenis (in Dutch). Amsterdam: Frederik Muller. 1852. pp. 140–141.
- "Geschiedenis" [History]. Lille gemeente (in Dutch).
