= Guy of Brimeu =

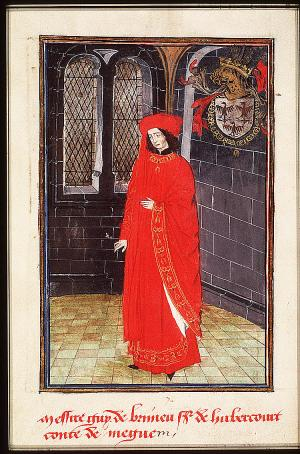

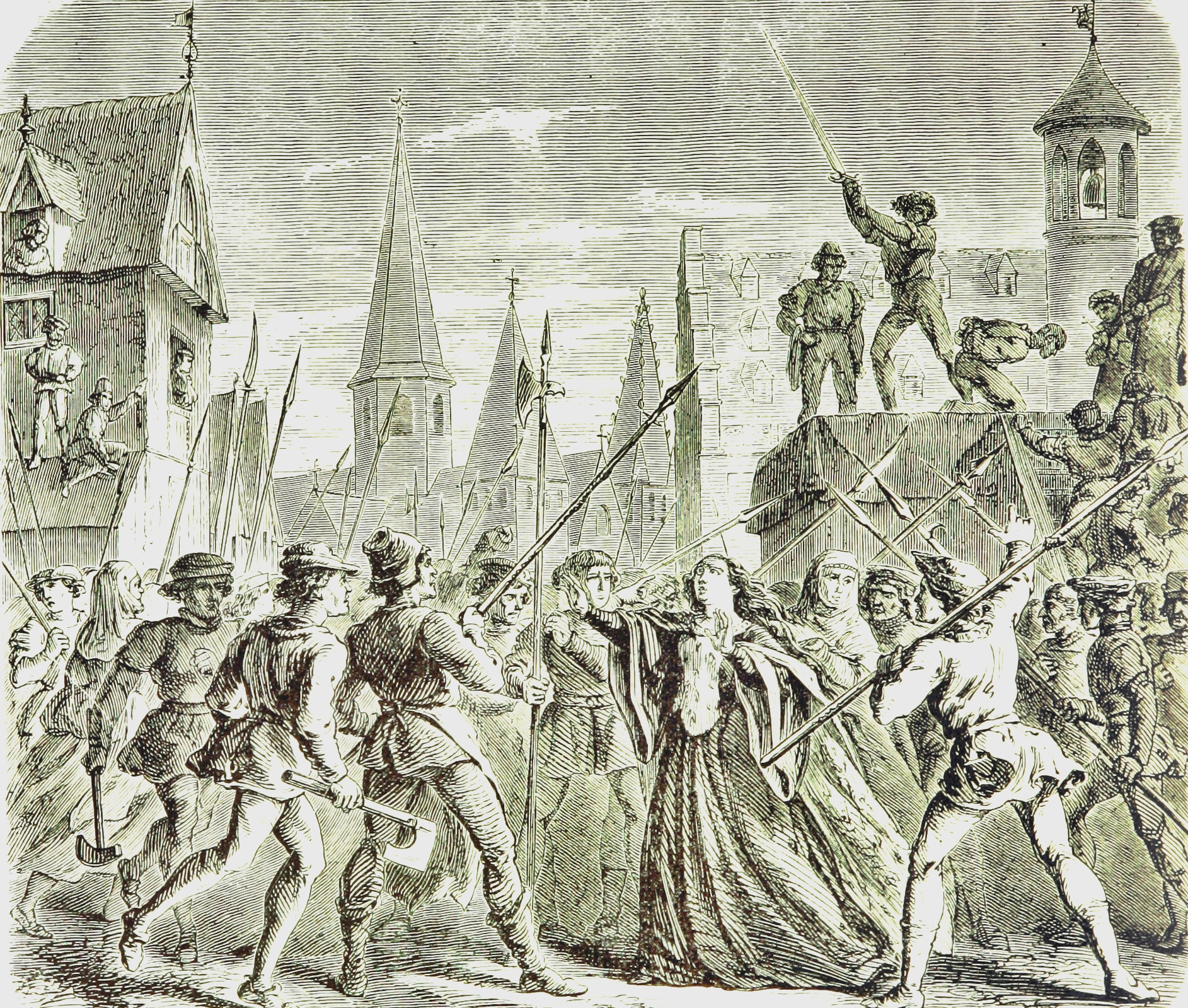
Execution

Guy de Brimeu known as the great or Gwijde of Brimeu, was a knight of the Golden Fleece, he was beheaded in Ghent on 3 April 1477.

== Family ==
His father was Jean of Brimeu, Lord of Humbercourt. He married Antonia de Rambures. Children:

- Charles of Brimeu
- Adrian of Brimeu, Lord of Humbercourt: Died in the battle of Marignano.
- Eustache of Brimeu, married Barbara of Hillery
- Charlotte of Brimeu
- Anne Of Brimeu, married John III of Glymes, Lord of Bergen op Zoom.
  - Anthony of Glymes, Marquess of Berghes.
    - Robert of Berghes
- Lamberte of Brimeu, married Ferry of Croy.
- Guye of Brimeu

== Career ==
Jean of Croÿ, Lord of Roeulx gifted the dominium of Wesemael to Guy of Brimeu in 1471 and he became the new Marshal of Brabant. He was introduced into the Order of the Golden Fleece on 9 May 1473. He was a personal friend and member of the court of the Duke of Burgundy, Charles the Bold.

== Execution ==
After the death of Charles the Bold, the Flemish cities regained part of their power and dealt with the persons who symbolized the centralist politics of the Duke of Burgundy. Mary of Burgundy tried to save their lives, but Guy was beheaded in Ghent after torture on 3 April 1477, together with Chancellor Guillaume Hugonet and Treasurer Jan van Melle.
