= Charles de Brimeu =

- Count of Megen
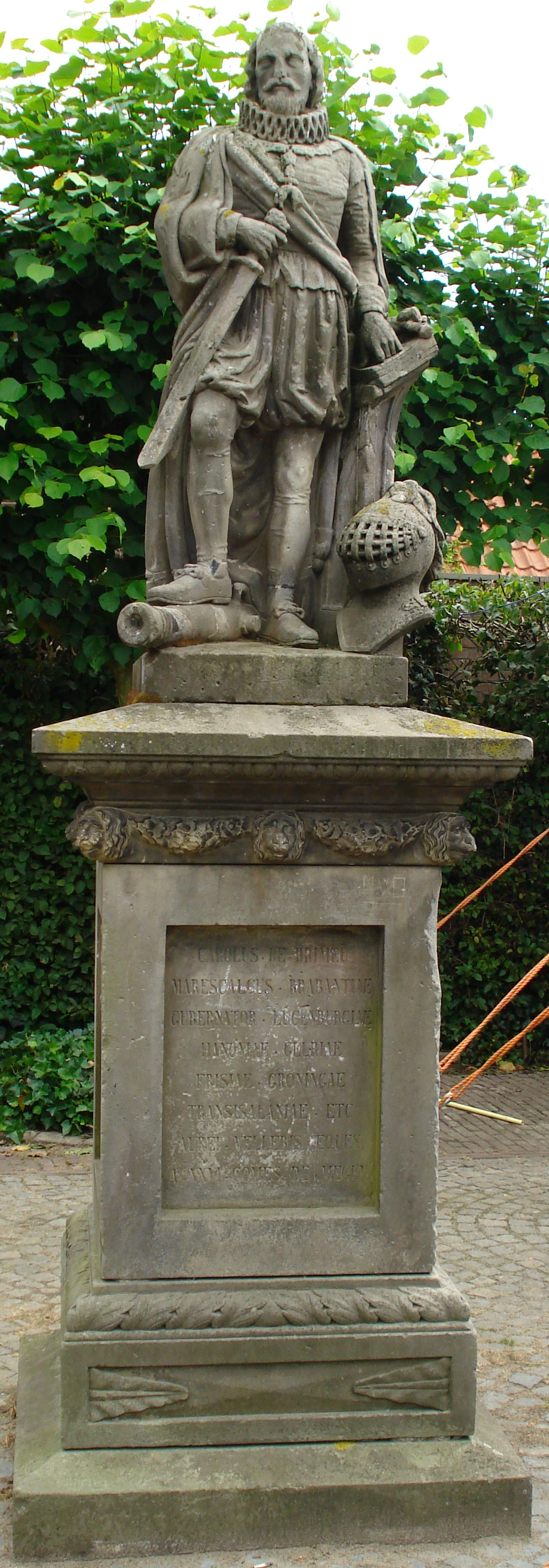
- Statue of Charles de Brimeu in Megen

Stadtholder of Gelderland
- Title held: 1556–1572
- Other titles: Lord of Humbercourt; Lord of Houdain; Lord of Éperlecques
- Born: 1524 or 1525
- Died: 1572; Zwolle, Netherlands
- Noble family: House of Brimeu
- Issue: None
- Father: Eustache of Brimeu

Charles de Brimeu (1524 or 1525 – 1572 in Zwolle) was the last count of Meghem, lord of Humbercourt, of Houdain and Éperlecques. He was grandson of Guy of Brimeu, who was beheaded in Ghent. He became the last ceremonial Hereditary Marshal of Brabant of his family: he sold this ceremonial office to Gaspard II Schetz.

== Career ==
During his career he became stadtholder of Gelderland (from 1556) and Order of the Golden Fleece. He opposed the centralizing policy of Philip II of Spain. During the Dutch Revolt, however, he remained loyal to the crown of Spain, and in June 1568 defended Groningen successfully against Louis of Nassau. Dying without direct descendants, his titles passed on to his niece Marie of Brimeu (born in 1550 – died in Liege on 18 April 1605), wife of Lancelot of Berlaymont then (from 1580) of Charles III de Croÿ. Marie, a convinced Calvinist, had a decisive influence on her second husband, until their separation in 1584.
