= Cornelis of Glymes =

Cornelis of Glymes or Cornelis of Bergen (1 April 1458 – 1508/1509) was an Admiral of the Netherlands.

He was born in Wouw, the second son of John II of Glymes (1417–1494), Lord of Bergen op Zoom, and his wife Margaretha of Rouveroy. His elder brother was John III of Glymes, First Chamberlain.

Cornelis participated in the Battle of Nancy (1477) and the Battle of Guinegate (1479). He also commanded the fortress of Grave, an important Habsburg stronghold in the war against Guelders. Between 1490 and 1491, he was Admiral of the Netherlands, and participated in the submission of the Flemish rebellion against Maximilian of Austria. He was succeeded by Philip of Burgundy-Beveren.

Cornelis was Lord of Zuid-Polsbroek and acquired in 1495 the Lordship of Grevenbroek. In 1501, Philip the Fair made him a Knight in the Order of the Golden Fleece.

He married in 1481 with Maria Margaretha van Strijen, daughter of Arend, Lord of Zevenbergen, and Maria of Vianen. They had the following issue:

- Margareth of Glymes (ca 1481 – after 1551), married Floris van Egmont.
- Marie of Glymes (†1566), married Louis de Ligne, mother of Jean de Ligne
- Maximilian of Glymes (†1522), his successor
- Leonard of Glymes (†1523)
- Cornelis of Glymes (†1560), Prince Bishop of Liège (1538–1544)

He also had an illegitimate and post mortal daughter : Geertrui of Bergen (1510–1541)
