= Philippe III de Croÿ =

Knight and Duke of Aarschot

Philippe III de Croÿ Knight of the Order of the Golden Fleece
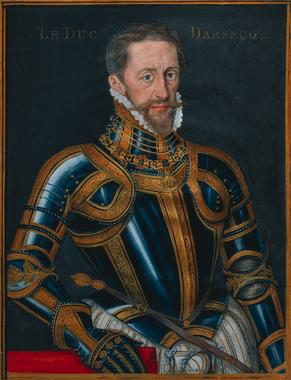
- Prince of Chimay, Duke of Aarschot

Governor of Antwerp
- Monarch: Philip II

Stadtholder of Flanders
- In office 1577
- Preceded by: Jean de Croÿ, Count of Rœulx
- Succeeded by: Charles III de Croÿ

Personal details
- Born: 10 July 1526 Valenciennes
- Died: 11 December 1595 (aged 69) Venice
- Spouse: Johanna Henriette van Halewyn
- Relations: Charles II de Croÿ (brother)
- Children: Charles III de Croÿ
- Parent(s): Philippe II de Croÿ; Anna de Croÿ

Philippe de Croÿ, 3rd Duke of Aarschot, 4th Prince of Chimay, Count of Porcean (10 July 1526, Valenciennes – 11 December 1595, Venice), was Stadtholder of Flanders, and inherited the estates of the ancient and wealthy family of Croÿ. Becoming a soldier, he was made a Knight of the Order of the Golden Fleece by Philip II of Spain, king of Spain, and was afterwards employed in diplomatic work.

== Early life ==
He was the second son of Philippe II de Croÿ (1496–1549) and Anna de Croÿ (1501–1539). After the death of his elder brother Charles II de Croÿ in 1551, he became 3rd Duke of Aarschot, 4th Prince of Chimay and 4th Count of Beaumont.

== Career ==
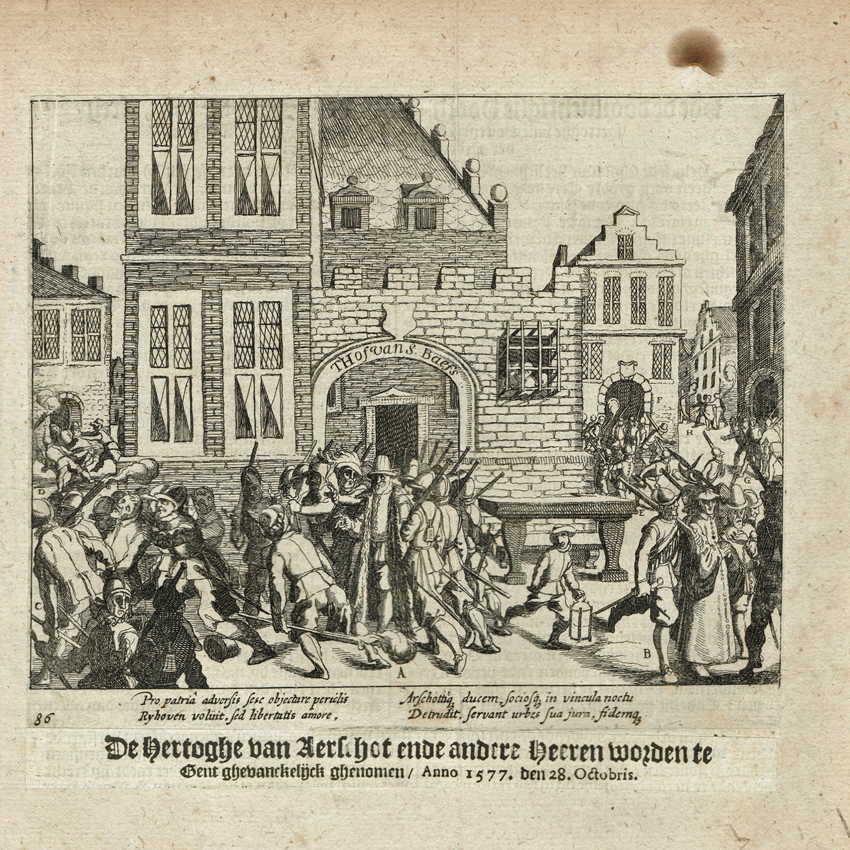
Philippe de Croÿ, Duke of Aarschot and other nobles are taken prisoner in the court of St Bavo's Cathedral, Ghent in Ghent on 28 October 1577, print from "The Wars of Nassau" by Willem Baudartius.

He took part in the troubles in the Netherlands, and in 1563 refused to join William the Silent and others in their efforts to remove Cardinal Granvelle from his post. This attitude, together with Aarschot's devotion to the Roman Catholic Church, which he expressed by showing his delight at the Massacre of St. Bartholomew, led Philip of Spain to regard him with still greater favor, which, however, was withdrawn in consequence of Aarschot's ambiguous conduct when welcoming the new governor, John of Austria (Don Juan de Austria), to the Netherlands in 1576.

In spite, however, of his being generally distrusted by the inhabitants of the Netherlands, he was appointed governor of the citadel of Antwerp when the Spanish troops withdrew in 1577. After a period of vacillation, he deserted Don John towards the end of that year.

Jealous of the Prince of Orange, he was then the head of the party which induced the Archduke Matthias (afterwards emperor) to undertake the sovereignty of the Netherlands, and soon afterwards was appointed Stadtholder of Flanders by the state council. A strong party, including the burghers of Ghent, distrusted the new stadtholder and Aarschot, who was taken prisoner during a riot at Ghent, and was only released on promising to resign his office.

He then sought to regain the favor of Philip of Spain, and having been pardoned by the king in 1580 again shared in the government of the Netherlands; but he refused to serve under the count of Fuentes when he became governor-general in 1594, and retired to Venice, where he died in December 1595.

== Personal life ==
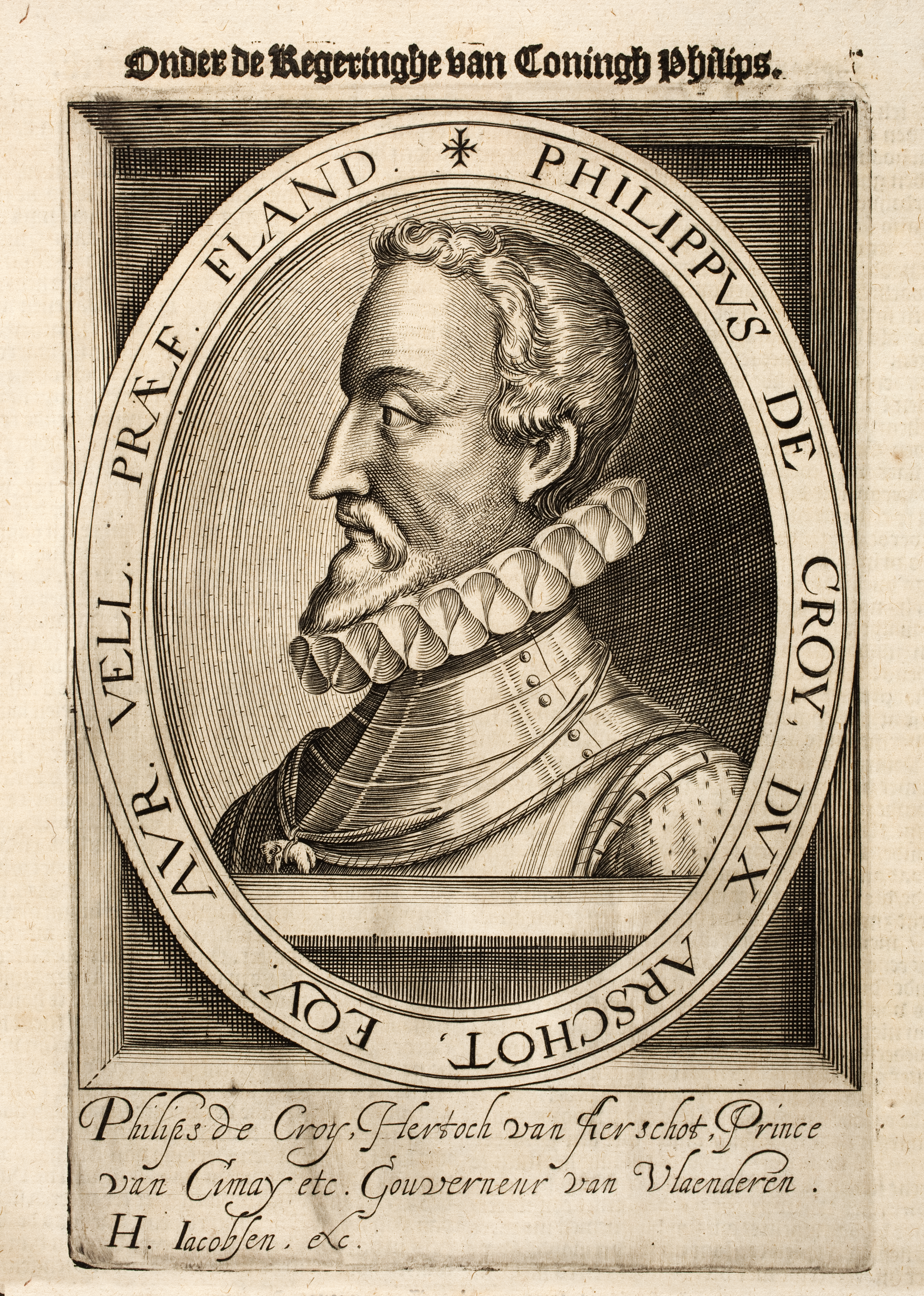
Engraving of Philipe III de Croÿ

On 24 January 1558, Philip III was married to Johanna Henriette van Halewyn, daughter of Jean III de Halewyn, Vicomte de Nieuwpoort and Jossyne de Lannoy. Together, they had three children:

- Charles III de Croÿ (1560–1612), Duke of Aarschot, who married 1) Marie de Brimeu and 2) Dorothée de Croÿ-Havré. No issue.
- Anne de Croÿ (1563–1635), who married Charles de Ligne, 2nd Prince of Arenberg
- Margareth de Croÿ (1568–1614), who married 1) Pierre de Hénin, 4th Count of Bossu; and 2) Wratislaw von Fürstenberg-Möhringen.

After the death of his first wife, on 1 May 1582, he married Jeanne de Blois-Trélon († 1605), daughter of Louis II de Blois, Seigneur de Trélon, and Charlotte d'Humières.

== Bibliography ==
- Marini, Mirella (2016). "From Arenburg to Aarschot and Back Again: Female Inheritance and the Disputed "Merger" of Two Aristocratic Identities". In Geevers, Liesbeth; Marini, Mirella (eds.). Dynastic Identity in Early Modern Europe: Rulers, Aristocrats. Routledge. pp. 103–130.
