= Humbercourt =

- Commune
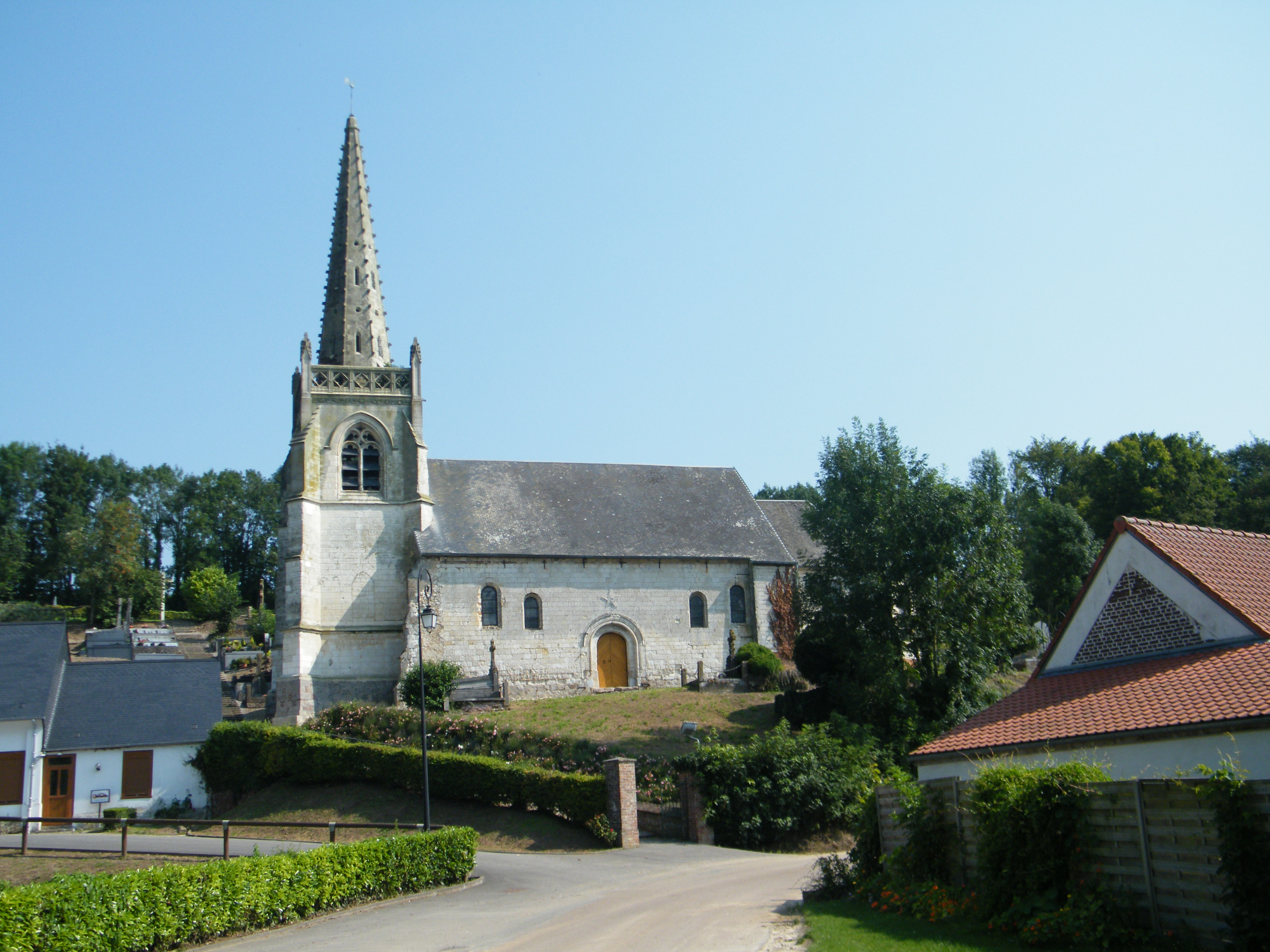
- The church in Humbercourt

- Coat of arms
- Location of Humbercourt
- Location within France Location within Hauts-de-France
- Coordinates: 50°12′39″N 2°27′18″E
- Country: France
- Region: Hauts-de-France
- Department: Somme
- Arrondissement: Amiens
- Canton: Doullens
- Intercommunality: CC Territoire Nord Picardie

Government
  - Mayor (2020–2026): Catherine Penet-Caron
- Area^{1}: 8.25 km^{2} (3.19 sq mi)
- Elevation: 115 m (377 ft)
- Highest elevation: 173 m (568 ft)
- Lowest elevation: 95 m (312 ft)
- Population (2023): 247
  - Density: 29.9/km^{2} (77.5/sq mi)
- Time zone: UTC+01:00 (CET)
  - Summer (DST): UTC+02:00 (CEST)
- INSEE/Postal code: 80445 /80600
- ^{1} French Land Register data, which excludes lakes, ponds, glaciers > 1 km^{2} (0.386 sq mi or 247 acres) and river estuaries.

Humbercourt (French pronunciation: [œ̃bɛʁkuʁ]; Picard: Himbèrcourt) is a commune in the Somme department in Hauts-de-France in northern France.

== Geography ==
Humbercourt is situated on the D127 road, some 16 miles (26 km) southwest of Arras and on the border with the Pas-de-Calais département formed by the Grouches valley. To the north is the Bois de Dessus, but for the most part, the district is flat farm land.

== History ==
Linked with the seigneurs of the House of Brimeu, whose coats of arms adorn the church porch, along with the Toison d'Or awarded to Jean De Brimeu for his services to the duke, Charles the Bold.

== Population ==
Historical population
Year	Pop.	±% p.a.
1968	370	—
1975	327	−1.75%
1982	303	−1.08%
1990	295	−0.33%
1999	279	−0.62%
2007	259	−0.93%
2012	257	−0.15%
2017	268	+0.84%
2023	247	−1.35%
Source: INSEE

== See also ==
- Communes of the Somme department
