= Érard de la Marck =

Prince-bishop of Liège (1472–1538)

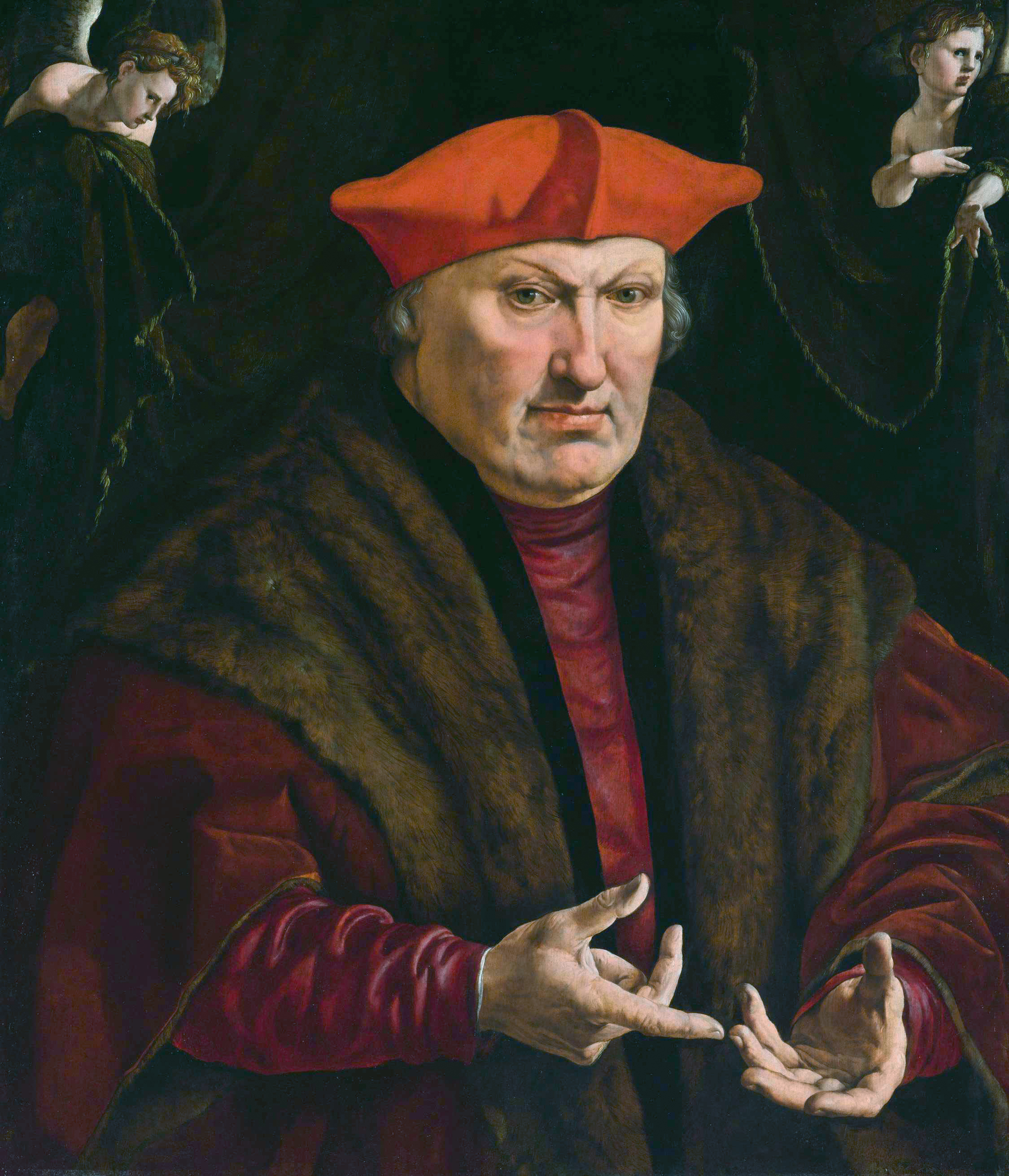

Prince-bishop of Liège
- In office 1506–1538

Archbishop of Valencia
- In office 1520–1538

Bishop of Chartres
- In office 1507–1525

Personal details
- Born: 31 May 1472 Sedan, Ardennes
- Died: 18 March 1538 (aged 65) Liège

Érard de la Marck (French pronunciation: [eʁaʁ də la maʁk]; 31 May 1472 – 18 March 1538) was prince-bishop of Liège from 1506 till 1538. He was born in Sedan, Ardennes, the third son of Robert I de la Marck, lord of Sedan and Bouillon.

== Life ==
Érard was also lord of Jametz, bishop of Chartres (1507–1525) and archbishop of Valencia (1520–1538). He was nominated Cardinal in 1520. He first tried to obtain protection from the King of France and finally allied with the emperor. He succeeded in securing peace in the prince-bishopric during his whole reign.

His reign is considered as the most flourishing of the Bishopric of Liège. He reconstructed the prince-bishop's palace, ruined by the wars of the last century with Burgundy. He also restored many monuments, including Saint Martin collegiate church.

== See also ==
- List of bishops and prince-bishops of Liège
- List of bishops of Chartres

== External links and additional sources ==
- Cheney, David M. "Archdiocese of Valencia". Catholic-Hierarchy.org. (for Chronology of Bishops) ^{[self-published]}
- Chow, Gabriel. "Metropolitan Archdiocese of Valencia". GCatholic.org. (for Chronology of Bishops) ^{[self-published]}
- Biography

Catholic Church titles
Preceded by René d'Illiers	Bishop of Chartres; 1507–1525	Succeeded by Louis Guillard
Preceded by Alonso de Aragón	Archbishop of Valencia; 1520–1538	Succeeded by George of Austria
Preceded by John of Hornes	Prince-bishop of Liège; 1506–1538	Succeeded by Corneille of Berghes
