= George of Austria =

Illegitimate son of Maximilian I, Holy Roman Emperor

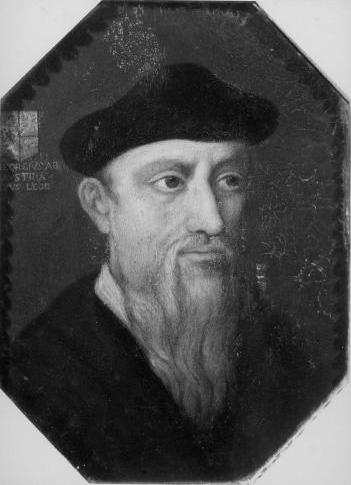
George of Austria

George of Austria (Ghent, 1505 – Liège, 4 May 1557), was Prince-bishop of Liège from 1544 to 1557.

He was an illegitimate son of Maximilian I, Holy Roman Emperor and Margaretha of Edelsheim. He became Bishop of Brixen (Tyrol) between 1525 and 1537 and Archbishop of Valencia between 1538 and 1544.

In 1544, he became Prince-bishop of Liège by the influence of his nephew Charles V, Holy Roman Emperor, a post he held until his death. George strongly opposed any French influence in the Prince-Bishopric of Liège, thus maintaining the strong grip of the Habsburgs, who controlled all surrounding lands.

In 1554, he was faced with a French invasion under King Henry II of France.

Catholic Church titles
Preceded by Sebastian Sprenz	Bishop of Brixen; 1525–1537	Succeeded by Bernardo Clesio
Preceded by Érard de La Marck	Archbishop of Valencia; 1538–1544	Succeeded by Thomas of Villanova
Preceded by Corneille of Berghes	Prince-bishop of Liège; 1544–1557	Succeeded by Robert of Berghes
