= Jacob de Bie =

Flemish engraver, publisher and numismatist

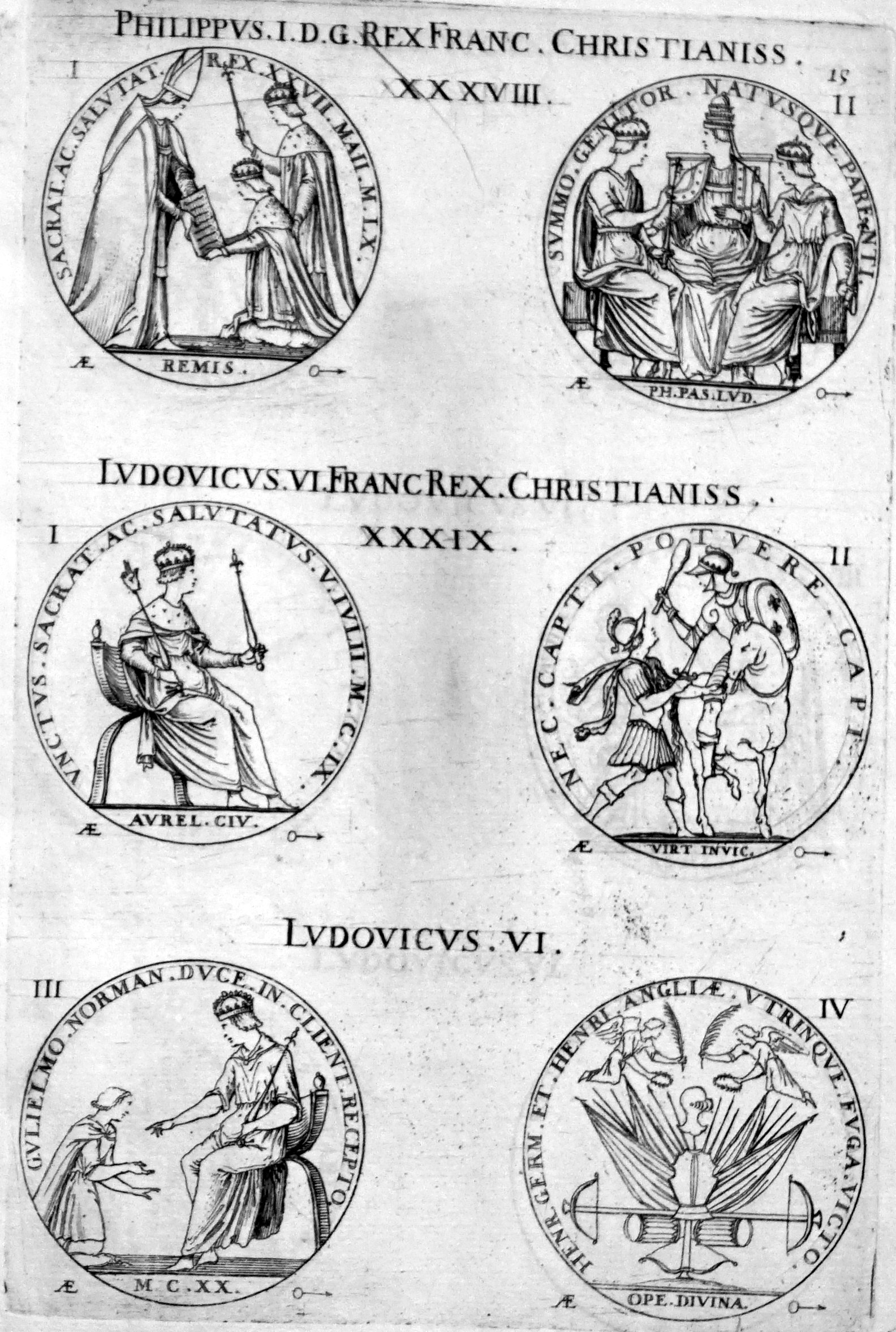
Medals from "La France métallique"

Jacob de Bie, known in France also as Jacques de Bie (Antwerp, 1581 – Arnhem (?), c. 1640) was a Flemish engraver, publisher and numismatist who worked in Antwerp, Brussels, Paris and Arnhem. As a reproductive artist he made engravings after designs of other artists of his generation. He was engaged in numismatic collecting and categorisation and was an official at the mint in Brussels. He is now mainly known for his publication of portraits of French kings.

== Life ==
Jacob de Bie was born in Antwerp, where he became the pupil of the prominent engraver Adriaen Collaert in 1594. He was admitted to the Antwerp Guild of Saint Luke as a master and 'copper engraver' ('plaatsnyer in ‘t coper') in 1607. Around 1610 he was appointed by Duke Charles III de Croÿ as keeper of the Duke's extensive ancient coin collection. Jacob de Bie moved to Brussels where the Duke was living. He began to work on an edition of the collection. When the Duke died in January 1612 Jacob de Bie was left without a job. He only finished and published the book on de Croÿ's ancient coin collection in 1615 in Antwerp under the title Imperatorum Romanorum numismata aurea a Julio Cæsare ad Heraclium continua serie collecta Et Ex Archetypis Expressa (A continual series of gold coins of the Roman Emperors from Julius Cesar to Heraclius collected and expressed through the originals). The publication contains 64 plates reproducing the Roman coin collection of Charles. The frontispiece was engraved by de Bie after a design by Peter Paul Rubens.

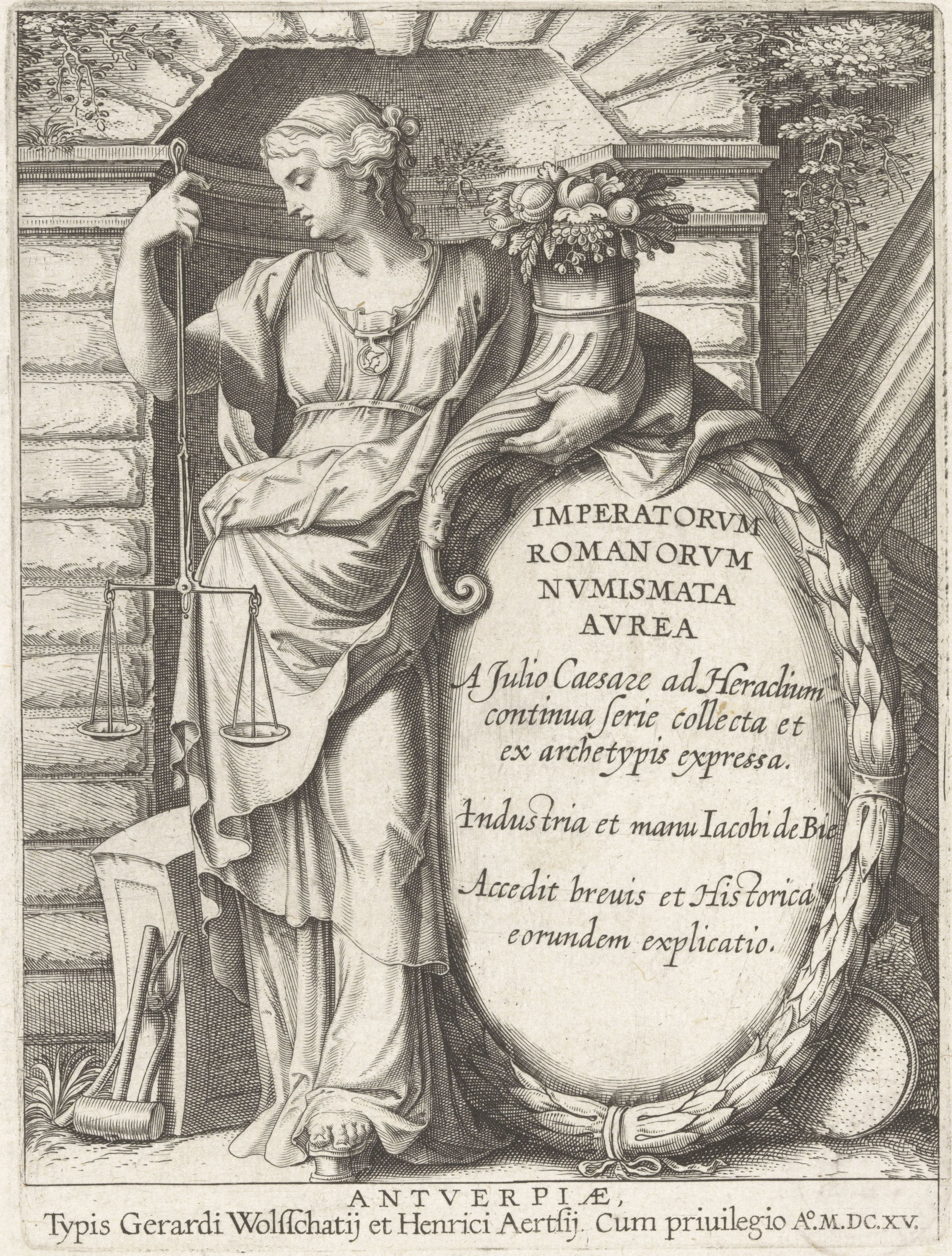
Frontispiece of the Imperatorum Romanorum Numismata Aurea...

Not long after losing his employment the Archdukes Albert and his consort Isabella, who were the then joint governors of the Southern Netherlands, appointed the painter Otto van Veen as the waerdeyn ('warden') of the revived Brussels Mint. With this nomination, the Archduke Albert and his consort Isabella fulfilled two very different goals. Firstly, they wanted to find a decent position for their beloved but ageing painter, and merely followed what had previously been done in 1572 when the great sculptor and medalist Jacques Jonghelinck had been made waerdeyn of the Antwerp Mint. Secondly, they needed to put at the head of the Brussels Mint a competent person, since they were then involved in launching a new series of coins as part of a general monetary reform.

Otto van Veen appears not to have been very enthusiastic about his new appointment as he tried to resign not long after taking up his office. This may have been linked to the difficult relaunch of the Brussels Mint. Otto van Veen who knew of Jacob de Bie's interest in ancient coins offered him the position of maître particulier at the Brussels Mint. The maître particulier was in charge of buying the required quantity of precious metals and organizing the coin production. Jacob de Bie accepted the position, but he soon found himself in trouble because he was blamed for the low quality of the coins produced. The blame rested in fact with the essayeur, the person responsible for the quality of the coins struck at the Mint. This essayeur was a certain Frans van den Driessche who was, however, not personally responsible for the quality problem. It was his two sons who, when they replaced their father during his absences, only produced low-quality coins. When this was discovered, Jacob de Bie was held responsible and he went on the run. Although his name was subsequently cleared, he had again lost his position.

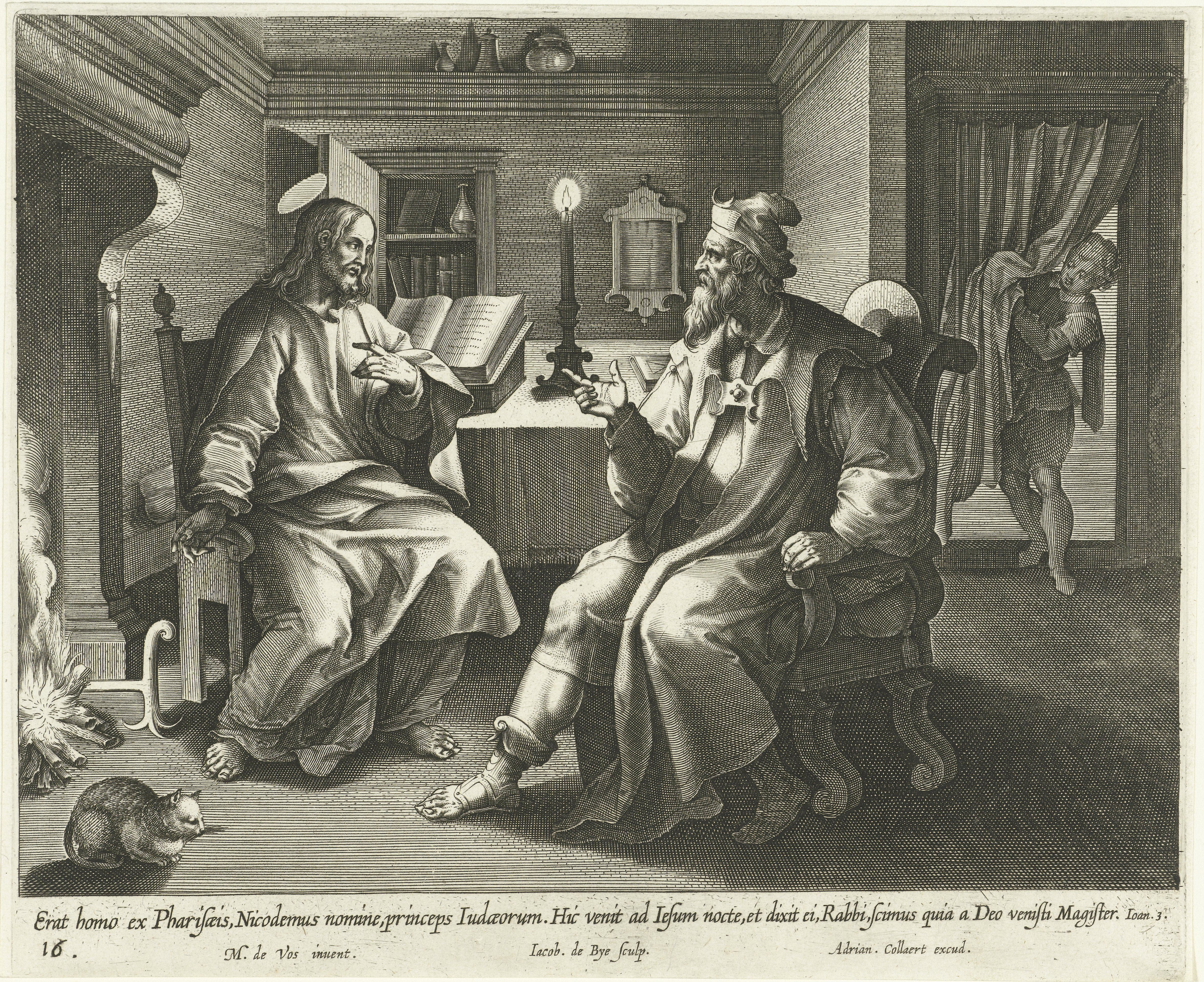
Conversation with Nicodemus from Passio et Resvrrectio Iesv Christi

After his failure at the Brussels Mint, Jacob de Bie finally published his book on Charles de Croÿ's ancient coin collection in 1615–1616. Due to his passion for coins, he had bought old stocks of numismatic books written by Hubert Goltzius together with an original and unpublished manuscript by the same author. Goltzius was famous in his time for the important books on ancient numismatics that he had published in the 1560-70s. Jacob de Bie managed to publish the unpublished manuscripts of Goltzius, but he was bankrupted by the small print run and its poor quality. In a letter of 1623 the French antiquarian Nicolas-Claude Fabri de Peiresc wrote to his close friend Rubens about la mala sorte del Signor de Bie (the bad luck of mister de Bie). De Peiresc offered his help. Peiresc wanted to buy Goltzius' manuscripts from Jacob de Bie. Nothing came of all this and it was left to the Plantin Press in Antwerp to eventually publish Goltzius' books twenty years later.

Again out of work and without money, Jacob de Bie left for Paris. Here he published several well-printed and successful books on numismatics. In Paris he also published in 1634 the work, which would ensure his fame, entitled Les vrais portraits des rois de France tirez de ce qui nous reste de leurs monumens, sceaux, medailles, ou autres effigies, conseruées dans les plus rares & plus curieux cabinets du royaume : au tres-chrestien roy de France et de Nauarre, Louis XIII ('The real portraits of the kings of France as taken from what remains of their monuments, seals, medals, or other effigies, preserved in the rarest & most curious cabinets of the kingdom: to the very Christian king of France and Navarre, Louis XIII'). Dedicated to the French king Louis XIII, this was the first well-researched and complete series of portraits of the Kings of France. In the preface de Bie explained his source material for creating the images: he used tombs for the 'première race' (i.e. the Merovingian kings), seals for the 'seconde race' (i.e. the Carolingian kings), and paintings and medals for the 'troisième race (i.e. the Capetian kings). For instance, for the portrait of Louis XI de Bie relied on a painting he saw in Fontainebleau. In the rare cases where he was unable to find a portrait, either because there was no true likeness or because there was not reliable likeness, he left the portrait blank, as Hubert Goltzius had previously done. De Bie's collection of portraits was copied frequently over the next two centuries. As late as the nineteenth century, de Bie's vrais portraits des rois de France were regarded as reliable sources of iconography. His portraits en medals served as models for real medals.

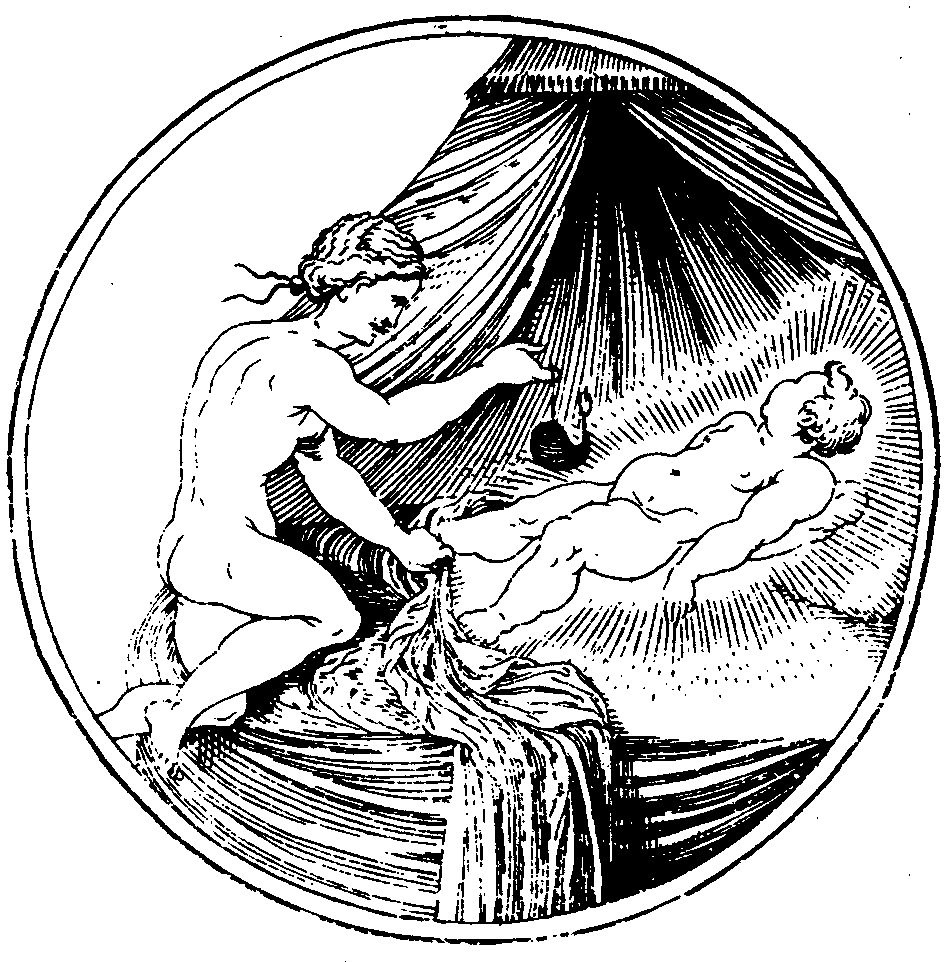
Curiosite d'amour from the Iconologie

In 1636 de Bie published another book called La France métallique, contenant les actions célèbres tant publiques que privées des rois et des reines remarquées en leurs médailles d'or, d'argent & de bronze. Tirées des plus curieux cabinets. Au tres-chrestien roy de France et de Navarre Louis XIII ('Metallic France, containing the famous public and private actions of kings and queens noticed in their gold, silver & bronze medals. Taken from the most curious cabinets. To the very Christian king of France and Navarre Louis XIII'). He was either the writer or designer of the book. It consists mainly of imaginary coins depicting key events during the reigns of the Kings of France. While de Bie designed the medals, the idea for it clearly went back to the custom in various countries, including the Southern Netherlands and the Dutch Republic, of striking medals (jetons) to commemorate important events. One side of the jeton would bear the arms of the country or the portrait of its ruler, while its reverse would show an allegorical representation of the event. In the France métallique, de Bie did not copy real jetons but rather invented imaginary jetons representing the noble deeds of the French monarchs. De Bie's book proved to be very influential, opening the way for the Médailles sur les principaux événements du règne entier de Louis le Grand (Paris: Imprimerie Royale, 1723), a major achievement in its field.

Jean Baudoin translated Cesare Ripa's Iconologia of 1593 into French and published it in Paris in 1636 under the title Iconologie. The Iconologia of Ripa was a highly influential emblem book based on Egyptian, Greek and Roman emblematical representations, many of them personifications. For the French translation, de Bie translated the woodcuts from Ripa's original book into linear figures inside circular frames, thus turning Ripa's allegories into the reverse side of Roman coins. The preface to the second edition of 1644 of the Iconologie states that de Bie had died and that his plates had been retrieved from the pawnshop. This suggests that de Bie had again fallen on hard times and had to pawn the plates and had then died. There exists some doubt as to whether de Bie had actually died. A few books (including an illustrated one) published in Arnhem a few years later refer to a Jacob de Bie paying the expenses for printing it or designing it. It is therefore possible that de Bie left Paris for Arnhem where he continued his publishing activities.

== Work ==
The principal achievements of de Bie are his ability to create systematic and clear publications on numismatics and his creativity in devising new ways to combine numismatics and history. His earliest known works are the prints he contributed to the Vita, passio et Resvrrectio Iesv Christi published by de Bie's master Adriaen Collaert in 1598. This was a series of prints depicting the life of Christ, based on illustrations by the Flemish painter and draughtsman Marten de Vos. Four other engravers produced engravings for this publication. Still, the 50 prints show a strong stylistic unity.
