= Gerard van Groesbeeck =

Belgian cardinal of the Catholic Church

His Eminence Gerard van Groesbeeck
- Prince-Bishop of Liège
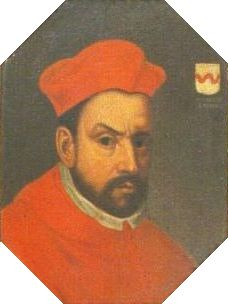
- Church: Catholic Church
- Diocese: Liège
- Appointed: 5 June 1564
- Term ended: 23 December 1580
- Predecessor: Robert of Berghes
- Successor: Ernest of Bavaria

Orders
- Consecration: 20 May 1565 by Gregoire Silvius
- Created cardinal: 21 February 1578 by Pope Gregory XIII
- Rank: Cardinal-Priest

Personal details
- Born: 1517 Hasselt, Belgium
- Died: 23 December 1580 (aged 62–63) Liège, Prince-Bishopric of Liège
- Coat of arms

Gerard van Groesbeeck (1517–1580) was a prelate who became the 88th Bishop of Liège, as well as Prince-Abbot of Stavelot and a cardinal of the Catholic Church.

== Early life ==
Gerard van Groesbeeck was born at Kuringen Castle outside Hasselt in 1517. His parents were Jan, Baron of Groesbeek (in Guelders), and Berthe de Ghoër. As a young man, he became a canon of Aachen Cathedral, and in 1548 the dean of the cathedral chapter of St. Lambert's Cathedral, Liège.

Groesbeeck was appointed coadjutor to prince-bishop Robert de Berghes in 1562, and was named his successor on 6 March 1563, while negotiations were in progress for Berghes' resignation. Groesbeeck became the administrator of the diocese on 11 April 1564.

== Prince-Bishop ==
On 5 June 1564 Groesbeeck was elected Prince-Bishop of Liège; his election was preconized by Pope Pius IV on 23 February 1565. He was consecrated as a bishop by Gregoire Silvius, titular bishop of Tagaste, in Herkenrode Abbey on 20 May 1565. He made his solemn entry into Liège on 3 June and into Maastricht on 17 June, before touring the "bonnes villes" of the principality to be inaugurated in each.

In a session of the Estates of the principality in 1566, as Calvinists were beginning to preach openly in the Low Countries, the bishop urged a more rigorous repression of heresy. He also demanded that the mayors of Liège entrust the keys to the city to his keeping, or in his absence to the dean of the cathedral, a demand that the city council opposed in a long-running on-and-off dispute that was resolved only in 1649. He invited Jesuits to preach in the city of Liège, but not to establish a house there.

In 1567, as the Dutch Revolt was beginning in the neighbouring Habsburg Netherlands, the towns of Hasselt, Maaseik, Stokkem and Maastricht openly rejected the bishop’s authority. Hasselt was brought to submit by military force. Maastricht, under the dual sovereignty of Liège and Brabant, was obliged to accept a Spanish garrison by Philip of Noircarmes. The citizens of Maaseik and Stokkem submitted to the prince-bishop rather than suffer a similar fate. With increasing numbers of Protestant refugees from the Habsburg Netherlands entering the principality, edicts were issued on 14 April 1567 and again on 27 September giving all foreigners three days' notice to depart from the territory, unless they were able to claim citizenship rights or could demonstrate that they had been living there peaceably for more than two years, with attestations that they had not participated in the Iconoclastic Fury.

While seeking to remain neutral in the Eighty Years’ War, Gerard van Groesbeeck was obliged to contend with infringements on his rights and territory by both the Duke of Alva and the Prince of Orange, particularly affecting Tongeren, Sint-Truiden, Saint-Hubert and Hastière, all of which were plundered by one side or the other. On 28 October 1568 Orange appeared before the walls of Liège with an army, demanding passage and promising to respect the city’s liberties, but was refused entry. He assaulted the city and began siege works, but quickly abandoned them, burning the convents of Saint-Laurent, Saint-Gilles and Val-Benoît before retreating. He and the Estates of Liège declared the Prince-Bishopric a neutral state in 1577.

Under Gerard van Groesbeeck's authority, a new codification of the legal procedures in the principality's courts was promulgated on 3 July 1572. In 1574, a letter from Pope Gregory XIII congratulating Groesbeeck on his conduct was published. In 1576, he became Prince-Abbot of Stavelot. Gregory made him a cardinal priest in the consistory of 21 February 1578, but he never traveled to Rome to receive the red hat or a titular church.

In 1577, when Margaret of Valois was travelling to Spa, Groesbeeck lent her his palace, himself temporarily moving to the Abbey of Saint-Jacques. The royal visit was the occasion for a series of celebrations, banquets and exchanges of gifts. She described her host as "a lord accompanied by much virtue, prudence and goodness, who speaks French well; agreeable of person, honourable, magnificent and agreeable company."

He died on 29 December 1580 and was buried in St. Lambert's Cathedral, Liège.

Catholic Church titles
Preceded by Robert of Berghes	Prince-bishop of Liège; 1565–1580	Succeeded by Ernest of Bavaria
