= Lords and margraves of Bergen op Zoom =

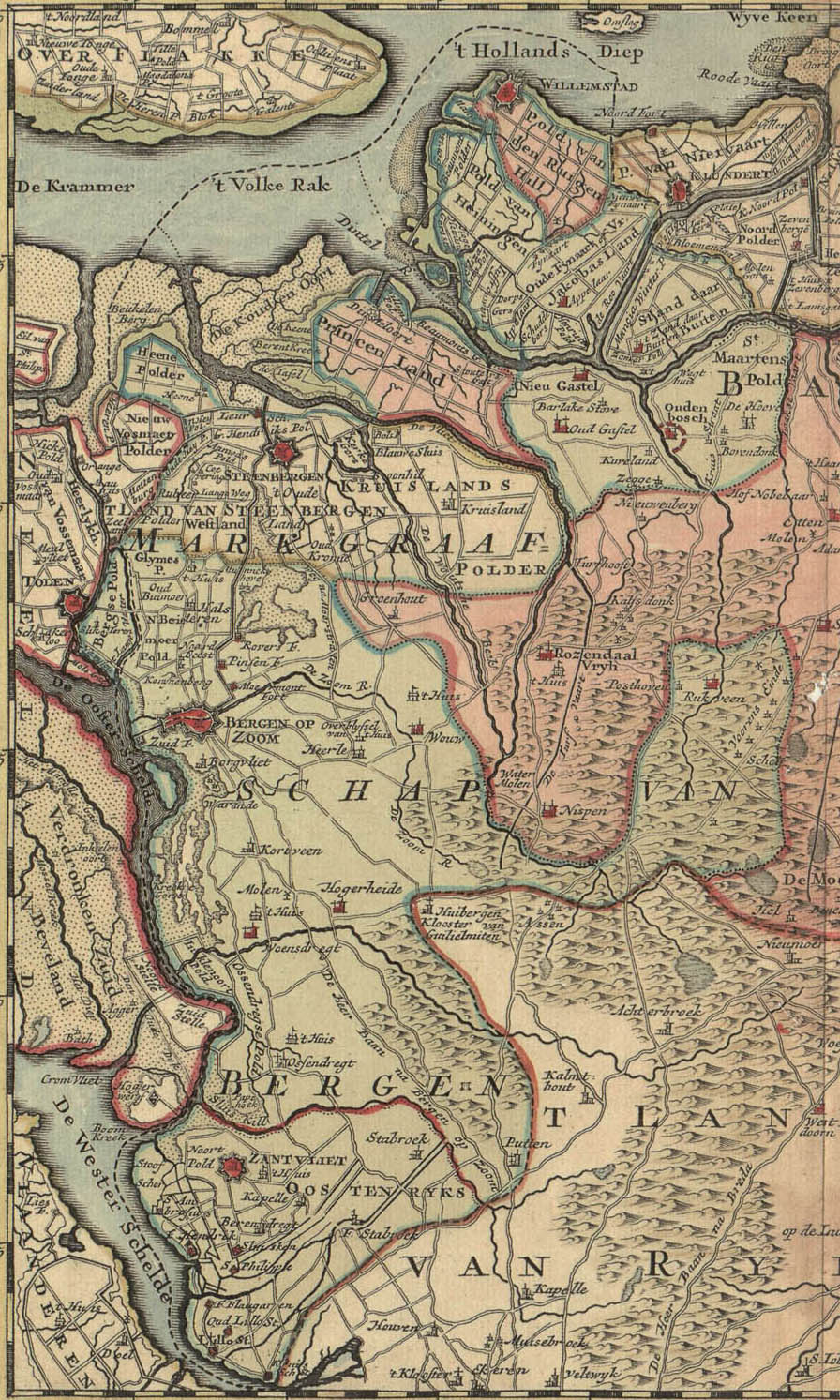
Map of the margraviate of Bergen op Zoom from 1747

The following is a list of lords and later on margraves of Bergen op Zoom. Bergen op Zoom became separated from the lordship of Breda in 1287 under the nominal overlordship of the duchy of Brabant. In 1485 the residence Markiezenhof Palace was built. In 1559 the lordship was elevated to the rank of margraviate. The title was only a nominal one until 1795 when it was abolished.

== Lords of Bergen op Zoom ==
=== House Wezemaal ===
- Gerard 1287-1309
- Arnold 1309-1313
- Mathilde 1313-1340

=== House Voorne ===
- Johanna 1340-1349

=== House Boutershem ===
- Hendrik I 1351-1371
- Hendrik II 1371-1419
- Hendrik III 1419

=== House of Glyme ===
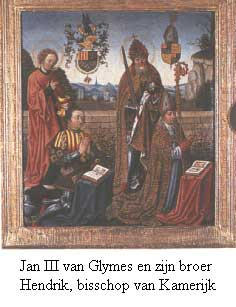
John III of Glymes and his brother Henri de Berghes

John II of Glymes	1419-1427
John III of Glymes	1494-1532
Antony of Glymes	1532-1541

== Margraves of Bergen op Zoom (1559) ==
=== House of Glymes ===
- John IV of Glymes 1541-1567

=== House Merode ===
- Maria Margaretha 1577-1588

=== House of Witthem ===
- Maria Mencia 1588-1613

=== House van den Bergh ===
- Maria Elizabeth I 1614-1633
- Maria Elisabeth II 1635-1671

=== House von Hohenzollern ===
- Henriëtte Franzisca 1672-1698

=== House of La Tour d'Auvergne ===
- Francois Egon de La Tour d'Auvergne 1698-1710
- Maria Henriette de La Tour d'Auvergne 1710-1728

=== House von Sulzbach ===
- Karl Philip Theodor 1728-1795
