= Jean Baudoin (translator) =

French translator (1590–1650)

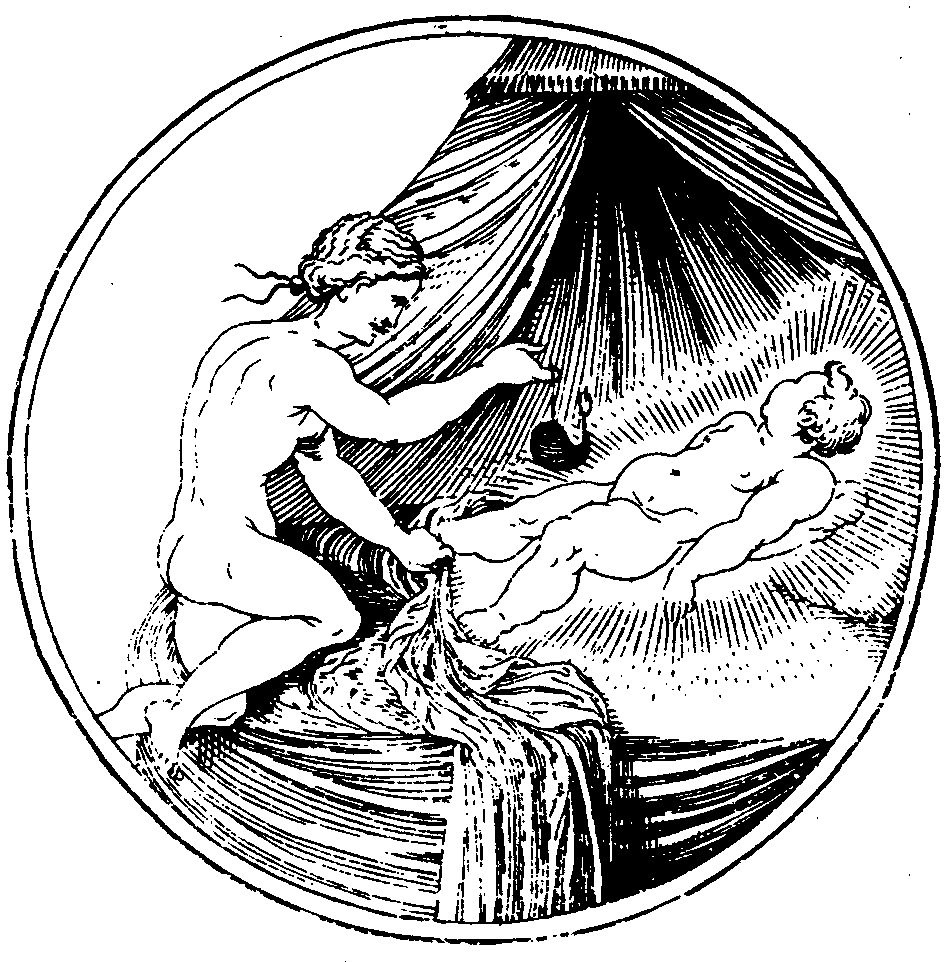
Curiosite d'amour from Baudoin's translation of the Iconologie

Jean Baudoin (1590–1650), born in the Vivarais region (then part of the province of Languedoc), was a French translator, notable as the first French translator of Torquato Tasso's La Gerusalemme liberata and as an early member of the Académie française, to which he was elected before 13 March 1634. He died of hunger and cold in 1650, and was succeeded at the Académie by François Charpentier.

Baudoin translated from English as well; his translation of Francis Godwin's The Man in the Moone first appeared in 1648 and went through four subsequent printings. His translation was also the basis for the German translation.

Baudoin translated Cesare Ripa's Iconologia of 1593 into French and published it in Paris in 1636 under the title Iconologie. The Iconologia of Ripa was a highly influential emblem book based on Egyptian, Greek and Roman emblematical representations, many of them personifications. For the French translation, the Flemish engraver Jacob de Bie translated the woodcuts from Ripa's original book into linear figures inside circular frames, thus turning Ripa's allegories into the reverse side of Roman coins.
