= La Falize Castle =

Castle in Wallonia, Belgium

Coordinates: 50.495941°N 4.818743°E

The Château de La Falize is a castle in the province of Namur in Wallonia (one of the three regions of Belgium). It is located about 5 kilometres (3.1 mi) north of the city centre of Namur just off the old Gembloux-Namur (N904 road) at the top of the steep northern valley slope of the river Meuse.

== Etymology and geography ==
The name of the Château is derived from the Latin word falise (Cliff, French: falaise) because of its position close to the top edge of a steep declivity of the valley sides of the river Meuse at the foot of which is the city of Namur. Just south west of the Château the steep side of the Meuse valley is cut by the Houyoux, a tributary of the Meuse, which has created a smaller valley in the steep declivity of the Muse valley. The Houyoux is used by the land transport routes from Gembloux and Namur, to descend into the Meuse valley from the plain above.

== History ==
The Château de La Falize was built in the 15th and 16th centuries with 20th century additions.
In 1638, King Philip IV of Spain, leased this manor in 1638 to Gilles I of Glymes, Lord of La Falize, for the sum of 1500 florins. Honoré de Glymes-Brabant, son of Ignace-François de Glymes-Brabant, Lord of la Falize built most of the current structure in 1757.

The Château was the headquarters of William of Orange during the Siege of Namur in 1695.
