= Brimeux =

- Commune
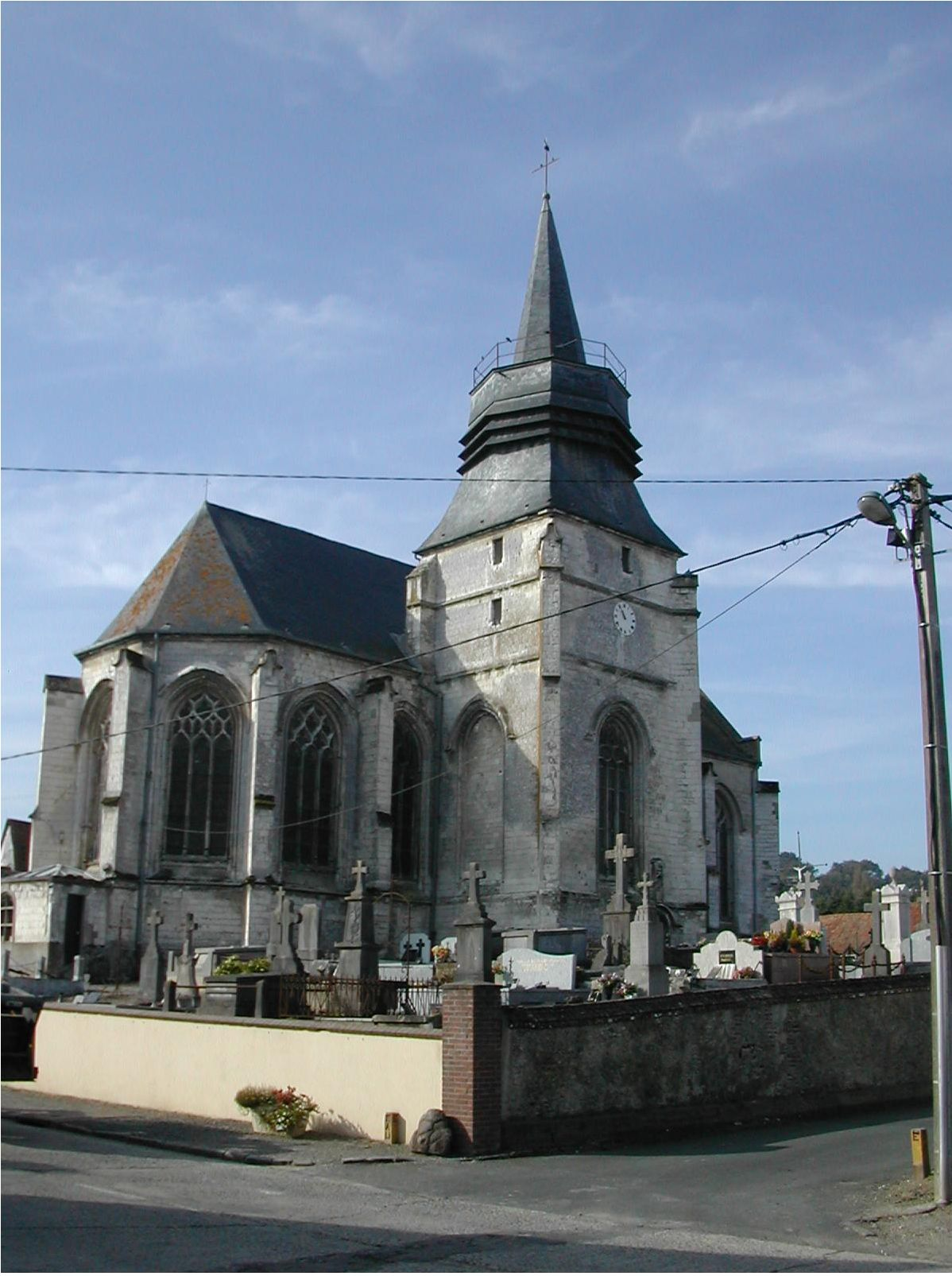
- The church of Brimeux

- Coat of arms
- Location of Brimeux
- Location within France Location within Hauts-de-France
- Coordinates: 50°26′43″N 1°50′06″E
- Country: France
- Region: Hauts-de-France
- Department: Pas-de-Calais
- Arrondissement: Montreuil
- Canton: Auxi-le-Château
- Intercommunality: CC des 7 Vallées

Government
  - Mayor (2020–2026): Yves Gille
- Area^{1}: 10.68 km^{2} (4.12 sq mi)
- Elevation: 10 m (33 ft)
- Highest elevation: 84 m (276 ft)
- Lowest elevation: 6 m (20 ft)
- Population (2023): 868
  - Density: 81.3/km^{2} (210/sq mi)
- Time zone: UTC+01:00 (CET)
  - Summer (DST): UTC+02:00 (CEST)
- INSEE/Postal code: 62177 /62170
- ^{1} French Land Register data, which excludes lakes, ponds, glaciers > 1 km^{2} (0.386 sq mi or 247 acres) and river estuaries.

Brimeux (French pronunciation: [bʁimø]) is a commune in the Pas-de-Calais department in the Hauts-de-France region in northern France.

== Geography ==
Brimeux is a village situated some 4 miles (7 km) southeast of Montreuil-sur-Mer on the D149 road, in the valley of the river Canche.

== History ==
The village name first appears in 1042 in a royal charter and was then written Brivermacum, a Latin name from the Celtic for bridge. Over the years, it has had different spellings such as Brivamagus, Brivomagus, Brimeaus (in 1153), Brimodio and Brimodium (in 1154), Brimaus in 1226, Brimeul in 1415, Brimeu by 1499, and finally Brimeux, in 1704.

When peat was extracted at Brimeux, a 5 metre long wooden deck, a tin dish and flakes of flint were discovered, indicating that Brimeux had been inhabited before the arrival of the Romans.

Various objects of the Gallo-Roman era were unearthed during the construction of the railway station: coins; weights and the remains of a villa.

The area was ransacked by the invading Normans in 842.

There are traces of the motte of the feudal castle owned by the House of Brimeu, seigneurs of the village.

== Sights ==
- The church.

Built between 1495 and 1524 by the seigneur, Hugh de Melun, in flamboyant Gothic style. The nave was restored in 1860 by the architect Norman Clovis who gave it the character that we see today. The bell tower once housed 3 bells but now only has the one, the others having been confiscated in 1793

- The war memorial erected in 1920.

== Population ==
The inhabitants are called Brimeusois in French.

Historical population
Year	Pop.	±% p.a.
1968	642	—
1975	618	−0.54%
1982	616	−0.05%
1990	660	+0.87%
1999	688	+0.46%
2007	738	+0.88%
2012	832	+2.43%
2017	847	+0.36%
2023	868	+0.41%
Source: INSEE

== See also ==
- Communes of the Pas-de-Calais department
