= Marie de Brimeu =

Belgian botanist

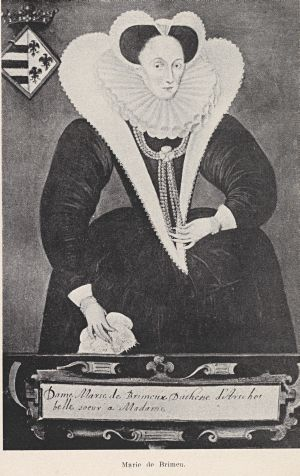
- Marie de Brimeu; Princesse de Chimay
- Born: 1550; Megen, imperially immediate county within the Duchy of Brabant, Habsburg Netherlands
- Died: 18 April 1605 (aged 54–55); Liège, Prince-Bishopric of Liège, Holy Roman Empire
- Resting place: Church in Megen
- Spouses: Lancelot de Berlaymont (1572–1578); Charles III de Croÿ (1580–1584)
- Scientific career
- Fields: Botany, Horticulture

Signature
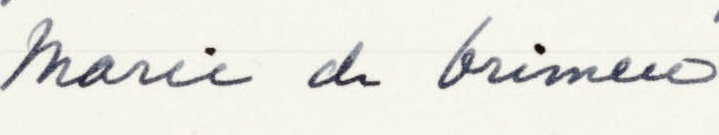

Marie de Brimeu (born ca. 1550, Megen, North Brabant, died Liège, 18 April 1605), was a Flemish noblewoman known for her knowledge of botany and horticulture. She inherited her titles from her uncle, Charles de Brimeu, Count of Meghem, when he died in 1572, becoming the Countess of Meghem. Her second marriage in 1580 to Charles III, Prince of Chimay, elevated her to the rank of princess.

== Life ==
=== Family and early life ===
Princess Marie de Brimeu of Chimay was the niece of Charles de Brimeu, Count of Meghem (1556–1572). He was her paternal uncle and she inherited his titles when he died without direct descendants. She thus became, among other titles, Countess of Meghem. She was born in 1550 in Megen (Meghem), a small town on the river Meuse, in the Duchy of Brabant, Habsburg Netherlands (it is now in the province of North Brabant, the Netherlands). She was the younger daughter of George de Brimeu, Lord of Quierieu (d. c. 1572), Charles' younger brother, by his second wife, Anna van Walthausen; her older sister was Marguerite de Brimeu. (Note: d'Hovel states her sister's name was Adrienne, and that she married Marie's first husband's brother, Claude de Berlaymont) She spent much of her early life in Mechelen, where her family had a large house behind the cloth hall. From her early life she developed an interest in gardens and plants, and in February 1571 sent a letter and plant material from Antwerp to the botanist Carolus Clusius in Mechelen, whom she had recently met there, suggesting that she had already established a garden in Antwerp. Another botanist, Matthaeus Lobelius, also refers to her Antwerp garden.

=== Marriages ===
Her first marriage, shortly before the end of January 1572, in Megen, was to Lancelot de Berlaymont, Lord of Beauraing (c.1550–1578), second son of Charles de Berlaymont, (Note: Some sources list him as the fifth son) who styled himself Count of Meghem in his wife's right. His father was an important public figure in the Netherlands, being a counsellor of Margaret of Parma, Governor of the Netherlands (1559–1567). As a fellow Catholic, he supported the Spanish Habsburgs in their struggle against the northern insurgents following the Dutch revolt of 1568. From 1570 he fought as a captain in a number of campaigns, and he was made governor of the fortress of Charlemont at Givet. In 1578 both he and his father died during the siege of Philippeville. She had two children from this marriage, both of whom died in infancy.

Following her first husband's death, she adopted Calvinism, but remarried into another Catholic noble family, this time of higher rank. On 3 September 1580, in Aachen, she married Charles III de Croÿ (1560–1612), Prince of Chimay, at 20 years old ten years her junior. She persuaded her husband to convert to Protestantism. On 12 June 1582, the couple were forced to flee from Liège, due to persecution of Protestants, eventually reaching the Protestant stronghold of Sedan, where they found refuge with Françoise de Bourbon, sister of Charlotte de Bourbon, William I of Orange's wife. It was at Sedan that Charles formally adopted Protestantism. From there the couple moved to Calais, Vlissingen and finally Antwerp, where they joined William I. Marie de Brimeu separated from her husband in 1584, when he returned to Catholicism. When they separated the States General on 13 September 1584 ruled that she had the rights to all her possessions, but this led to lengthy legal proceedings. From 1584 she resided in a number of Dutch cities, including Middelburg, Delft, Utrecht, Leiden and The Hague. She led a very independent life as a wealthy woman, even though her estranged husband unsuccessfully attempted to poison her in 1586. She found herself in good standing with the Earl of Leicester, whom Elizabeth I appointed as Governor General of the United Provinces of the Netherlands (1585–1587), and his followers, including Anna Walburgis van Nieuwenaer.

=== Single life ===
She spent much of her time on hunting and cultivated her gardens and special plants. Her family position placed her in the highest circle of the nobility of Southern Netherlands, but spent much of her life in the Northern Netherlands. In 1593, the States General requested that she move to The Hague to be closer to the court. Efforts continued to achieve a reconciliation between her and her husband, and an agreement was reached in 1600, by which she returned to the south, settling in Liège, where she also established a garden. Her last years were spent in ill health, and despite frequenting spas she died in Liège in 1605 at the age of 55, and was buried at the church in Megen.

=== Life and times ===
Marie de Brumeu was born into a French-speaking aristocratic Catholic family, the house of Meghem, in the Duchy of Brabant, which was one of the Seventeen Provinces of the Habsburg Netherlands. Her family had been faithful adherents of the Dukes of Burgundy who had been the rulers of the Duchy, and at the time of her birth, the Duke was Charles II (Emperor Charles V). Before she reached adulthood, Philip II had succeeded his father and the Netherlands had become plunged into turmoil in the Dutch Revolt. Calvinism was gaining ground, and the authorities were becoming increasingly repressive, introducing a local inquisition. Shortly after her second marriage, the northern provinces declared independence as the Dutch Republic (1581–1795) and the Duchy of Brabant was split between the two sides, with Megen in the new Protestant republic.

Her life and work took place during a tumultuous time in the Low Countries, the Eighty Years' War (1568–1648), but also a time of great intellectual development in the world of botany, referred to as a botanical Renaissance. Botany also provided one of the few areas at the time where men and women could both participate, and women could be acknowledged as experts.

== Work ==
She was known for her contributions to botany and horticulture, and was a member of the scientific network of Carolus Clusius from her acquaintance with him in Mechelen in the 1570s. Their correspondence, of which 27 letters to him have been preserved, forms a valuable source of information concerning the knowledge of botany at that time. Despite the difference in their social status, Marie de Brimeu was Clusius' closest and almost lifelong woman friend, and she reminded him that Justus Lipsius had called him "the father of all the beautiful gardens in this country". She developed an expertise in horticulture and creating gardens that attracted great interest throughout both the Southern and Northern Netherlands, and was an example of the intellectual and humanist philosophies in the Dutch Republic at that time, in which beauty could be appreciated for its own sake.

In 1590, when she moved to Leiden, she lived in a house next to the Hortus Botanicus of Leiden University, where Clusius would take up his position as prefect and professor in 1593. In addition to Clusius, she formed associations with other scholars such as Lipsius and many likeminded noblewomen, including her sister, Louise de Coligny (widow of William I), Madame Brederode, Madame Matenesse, Madame DeFresne and Anne de Lalaing, widow of Willem de Hertaing, Seigneur de Marquette. Several of these women were also correspondents of Clusius, sharing an interest in botany regardless of religious difference. She used her influence at the court and in Leiden University circles, among other things, to provide Clusius with an appointment in Leiden. In her Leiden garden, she cultivated different types of tulips and other exotic plants. After she moved away from Leiden, she continued her correspondence with Clusius and they exchanged plants. Her work was noted by other botanists, such as Matthaeus Lobelius, who refers to her in his Cruydtboeck (1581) as one of the more important Flemish tulip growers. Lobelius provided her with a catalogue from which she could order plants from Britain. Her diplomatic and political life involved her in the Dutch revolt after her first marriage.

== Legacy ==
The flower genus Brimeura was named after her by Richard Anthony Salisbury in 1866. (Note: Salisbury's dedication reads MARIA DE BRIMEUR, amore et culturâ Florum in tempore CLUSII inclyta" (Lover and cultivator of flowers in the time of Clusius). There has been some confusion as to whether he was misled by mistaken references in both Clusius and Lobelius into thinking she was Maria de Brimeur (d. 1604), wife of the Antwerp merchant Coenraad Schets, though there would be no reason to honour the latter in this way.)

== See also ==
- House of Brimeu
- History of the Netherlands

== Bibliography ==
=== Books, articles and theses ===
- Backer, Anne Mieke (2006). "Tuinkunst tijdens de Nederlandse Opstand. De prinses van Chimay. Marie de Brimeu en de "humanisering" van de bloem 1550-1605" [Garden art during the Dutch Revolt. The Princess of Chimay and the humanization of the flower] (PDF). Cascade. Bulletin voor Tuinhistorie (in Dutch). 15.
- Backer, Anne Mieke (2016). Er stond een vrouw in de tuin: over de rol van vrouwen in het Nederlandse landschap [There was a woman in the garden: On the role of women in Dutch landscaping] (in Dutch). Ronde Tafel, SU De. ISBN 978-90-6906-048-4.
- Bethencourt, Francisco; Egmond, Florike, eds. (2007). Cultural Exchange in Early Modern Europe vol. 3: Correspondence and Cultural Exchange in Europe 1400–1700. Cambridge University Press. ISBN 978-0-521-84548-9.
- Blaes, Jean Baptiste François; Henne, Alexandre (1860). Mémoires anonymes sur les troubles des Pays-Bas 2.: 1565–1580. Heussner.
- de Brouwer, Veerle (31 August 2017). Pineapples, Labyrinths, and Butterflies: Female Collectors in the Dutch Golden Age (MA thesis). Department of Arts and Culture, Leiden University.
- Dash, Mike (1999). Tulipomania: The Story Of The World's Most Coveted Flower & The Extraordinary Passions It Aroused. London: Orion Publishing Group. ISBN 978-1-78022-057-4.
- Egmond, Florike; Hoftijzer, Paul Gerardus; Visser, Robert Paul Willem (2007). Carolus Clusius: towards a cultural history of a Renaissance naturalist. Koninklijke Nederlandse Akademie van Wetenschappen. ISBN 9789069845067.
- Egmond, Florike (27 April 2016). "Brimeu, Marie de (ca 1550-1605)". Digitaal Vrouwenlexicon van Nederland (in Dutch). Huygens.
- Goñalons, Llorenç Sáez (2014). "Brimeura L.". In Talavera, S; Andrés, C; Arista, M; Fernández Piedra, MP; Rico, E; Crespo, MB; Quintanar, A; Herrero, A; Aedo, C (eds.). Flora Iberica. Vol 20 (PDF) (in Spanish). Madrid: Real Jardín Botánico, Consejo Superior de Investigaciones Científicas.
- d'Hovel, M. de Vegiano, Seigneur (1779). "Berlaymont". Nobiliaire des Pays-Bas, et du comté de Bourgogne. Supplement 1555-1614 (in French). Malines: J. Jacobs. pp. 16–18.
- Salisbury, Richard Anthony; Gray, J. E. (1866). The Genera of Plants (Unpublished fragment). J. Van Voorst. p. 26.
- Van der Gouw, J.L. (1947). "Marie de Brimeu. Een Nederlandse prinses uit de eerste helft van de tachtigjarige oorlog" [Marie de Brimeu. A Dutch princess from the first half of the eighty year war]. De Nederlandsche Leeuw (in Dutch). 64: 5–49.

=== Websites ===
- Egmond, Florike (2010). The World of Carolus Clusius: Natural History in the Making, 1550-1610. Pickering & Chatto. ISBN 9781317324218.
- "Carolus Clusius and sixteenth-century botany in the context of the new cultural history of science". Research and results. NWO. 2017.
