= Robert of Berghes =

- Prince-bishop of Liège
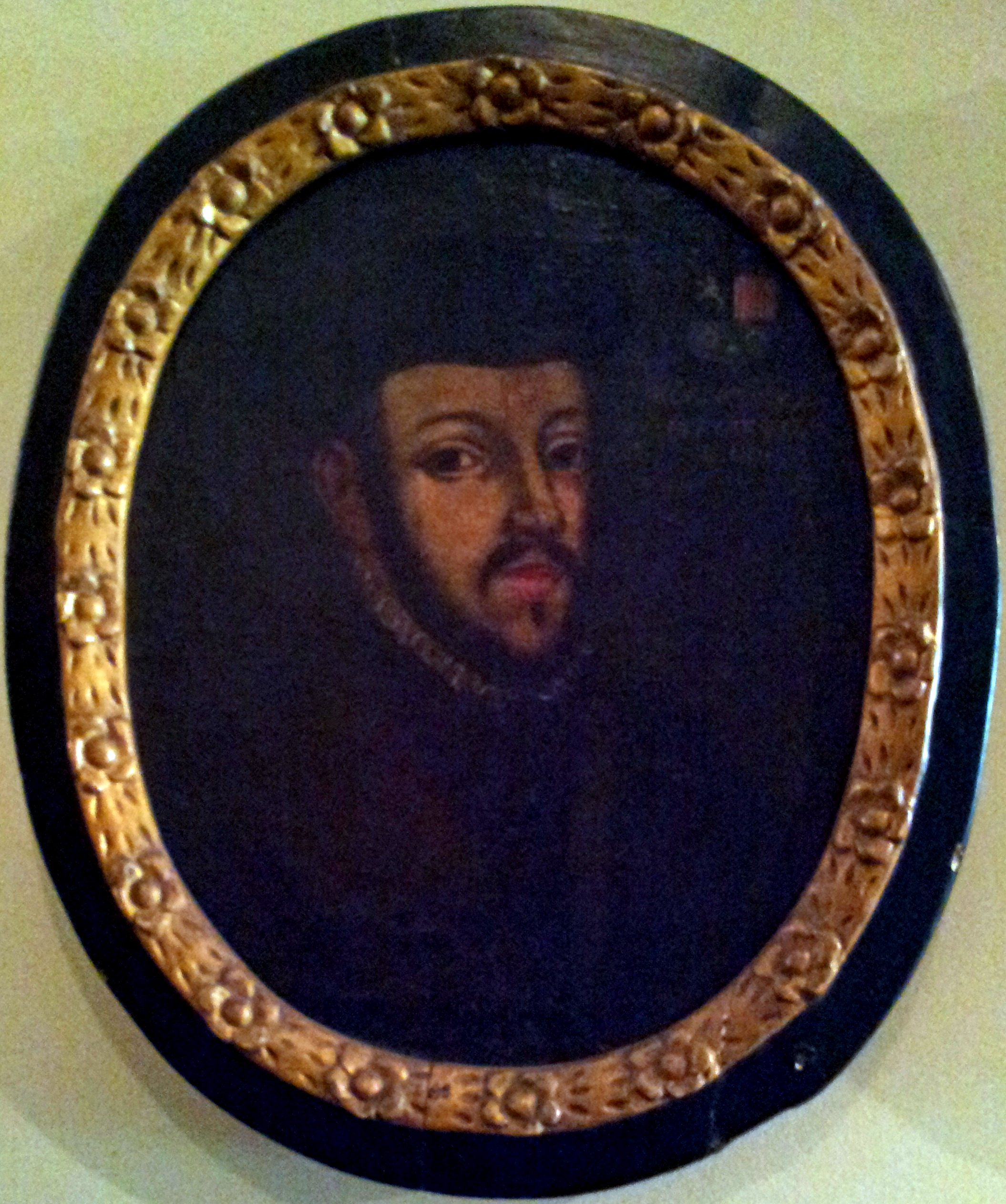
- Anonymous portrait of Robert of Berghes
- Church: Roman Catholic
- Diocese: Diocese of Liège
- Installed: 7 May 1557
- Term ended: 30 March 1563
- Predecessor: George of Austria
- Successor: Gerard of Grœsbeek

Personal details
- Died: 1564

Robert of Berghes or de Glymes-Berghes (died 1564) was 87th Prince-bishop of Liège (1557–1563). He was forced to resign the see on 30 March 1563, due to insanity, and died in the course of the following year.

He was the grandson of John III of Glymes, son of Anthony of Glymes, and a brother of John IV of Glymes.

Catholic Church titles
Preceded by George of Austria	Prince-bishop of Liège; 1557–1563	Succeeded by Gerard of Grœsbeek
