= Corneille of Berghes =

Bishop

- Prince-bishop of Liège
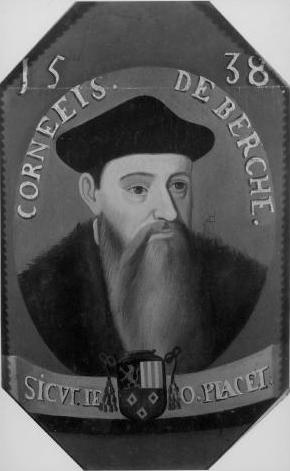
- Anonymous portrait of Corneille of Berghes
- Church: Roman Catholic
- Diocese: Diocese of Liège
- Installed: 1538
- Term ended: 1544
- Predecessor: Érard de La Marck
- Successor: George of Austria

Personal details
- Died: 1560 ?

Corneille of Berghes or de Glymes-Berghes (1490?–1560?) was Prince-bishop of Liège between 1538 and 1544.

Corneille of Berghes was the youngest son of Cornelis of Glymes, Admiral of the Netherlands and Maria Margaretha van Zevenbergen. First he was Prévôt in the Saint Peter's Collegiate church in Lille, then he stayed in Mechelen at the court of Margaret of Austria. In 1520 he became Coadjutor bishop in Liège, and when Prince-Bishop Érard de La Marck died in 1538, was made his successor by Holy Roman Emperor Charles V.

His reign was a disaster, because of his fanatic persecution of presumed heretics, which alienated himself from the population. He resigned in 1544 to get married. Very little was registered about the rest of his life and marriage, only that he died around 1560.

== Sources ==
- Joseph Daris, Histoire du diocèse et de la principauté de Liège pendant le XVIe siècle, Liège, Louis Demarteau, 1884, 698 p. « La principauté et le diocèse sous Corneille de Berghes », p. 123-142

Catholic Church titles
Preceded by Érard de La Marck	Prince-bishop of Liège; 1538–1544	Succeeded by George of Austria
