= Charles III de Croÿ =

- Prince of Chimay; Duke of Aarschot; Count of Beaumont
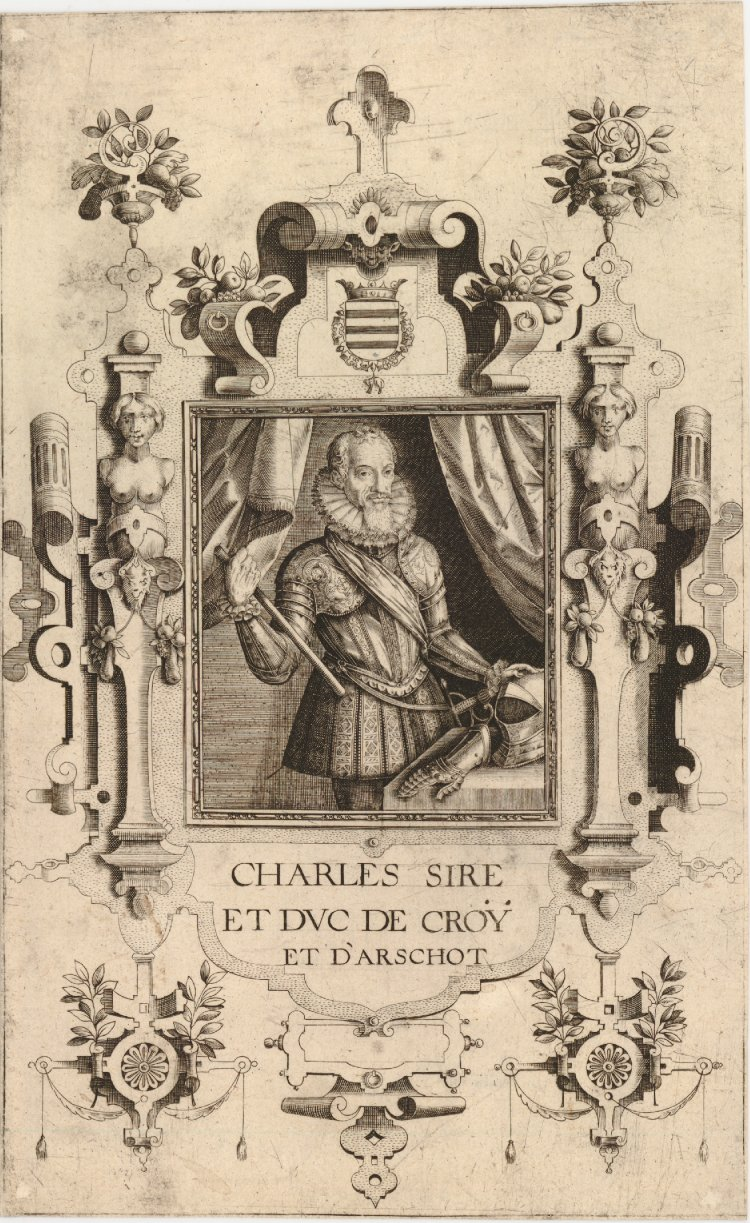
- Portrait of Charles III by Jacob de Bie
- Born: 1 July 1560; Beaumont, Hainaut
- Died: 12 January 1612 (aged 51); Beaumont, Hainaut
- Spouse: Marie of Brimeu (m. 1580; sep. 1584) Dorothea of Croÿ (m. 1605; died 1612)
- House: Croÿ
- Father: Philippe III de Croÿ
- Mother: Jeanne of Halewijn

Charles III de Croÿ (1 July 1560 – 12 January 1612) was Seigneur de Croÿ, 4th Duke of Aarschot, 5th Prince of Chimay and 5th Count of Beaumont. He played an important role on both sides of the Dutch Revolt. He was an avid collector of art and coins. His favourite residences were the Château de Beaumont and Heverlee castle, where he housed his collections and created beautiful gardens.

== Life ==
He was the eldest son of Philippe III de Croÿ, Prince of Chimay, Duke of Aarschot, and Jeanne of Halewijn.

His military career began in 1577 as lieutenant of his father's regiment of Walloon infantry. He married Marie of Brimeu, widow of Lancelot of Berlaymont, on 3 September 1580. She came from a rich Calvinist family in Picardy and was ten years older than her young husband. Her influence over Charles was so great that he abandoned his Catholic faith and his loyalty to the King of Spain. In 1583 he became stadtholder of Flanders for the Protestant insurgents. He was not able to stop the advance of Alexander Farnese and decided to reconcile with Spain in March 1584.

In 1584 he separated from his wife Marie of Brimeu and in 1585 he returned to the Catholic faith and loyalty to the Spanish Crown. Later that year, he handed over Bruges to the Spanish and in 1585 he did the same with Ghent. Over the next few years he fought alongside Farnese and was present at the Sieges of Grave, Venlo, Neuss and Sluis. His most important victory was the taking of Bonn on 13 September 1588. In 1590 he joined the Spanish troops that supported the Catholic League in the French Wars of Religion.

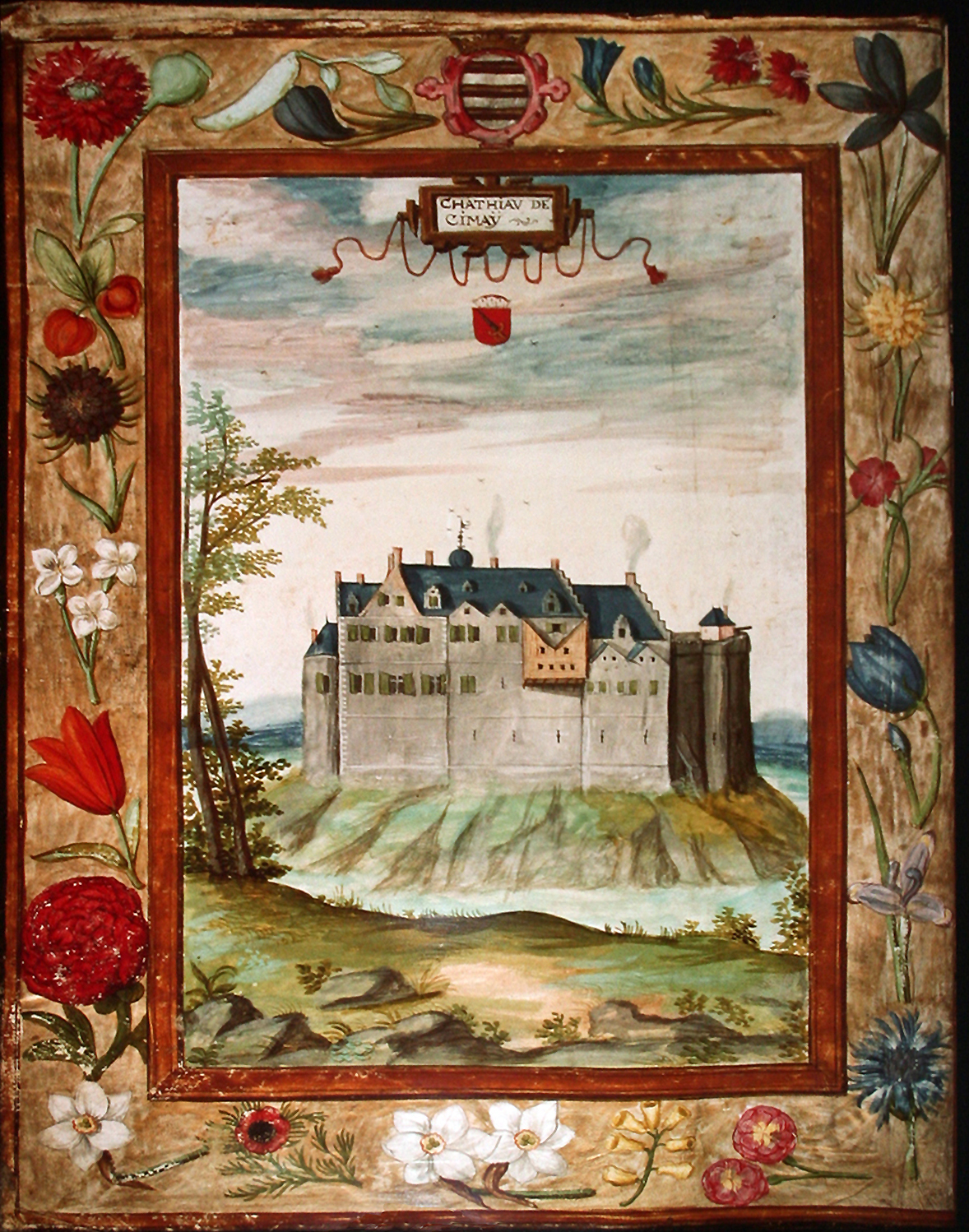
View of the castle of Chimay, by Adrien de Montigny

In 1599 he was rewarded with the Order of the Golden Fleece. In December 1605, eight months after the death of his first wife, he married his cousin Dorothea of Croÿ, daughter of Charles Philippe de Cröy, Marquis d’Havré (1549–1613). Both his marriages remained childless. After his death in 1612, all his titles and possessions went to his sister Anne of Croÿ and his brother-in-law Charles de Ligne, 2nd Prince of Arenberg.

== Collector ==
Charles was an avid collector of paintings, manuscripts, coins and medals.

=== The Albums ===
He is famous for his Albums, a collection of detailed, illustrated maps of all his domains. Already in 1590 he had ordered the production of a cartulary of the census and rents of the lands of Comines and Halluin, which he had received on the death of his mother. He had done the same at about the same period for the principality of Chimay, which he had received at the time of his marriage in 1580. These cartularies were in reality real atlases and contained numerous colored maps in the manner af a cadastre. These collections also contained some bird's-eye views of the castles and villages. But they were primarily administrative documents.

The idea then occurred to him to have these cadastral plans reproduced, not on paper, but on parchment, and to add, together with these plans, the view of each locality, painted in gouache in the manner of a small painting. The ensemble was realized in 1596–1598. It constitutes two large volumes still preserved today by the de Croÿ family: one covers property located in Hainaut, the other those lying in Brabant, Flanders, Namur, Artois and Picardy.

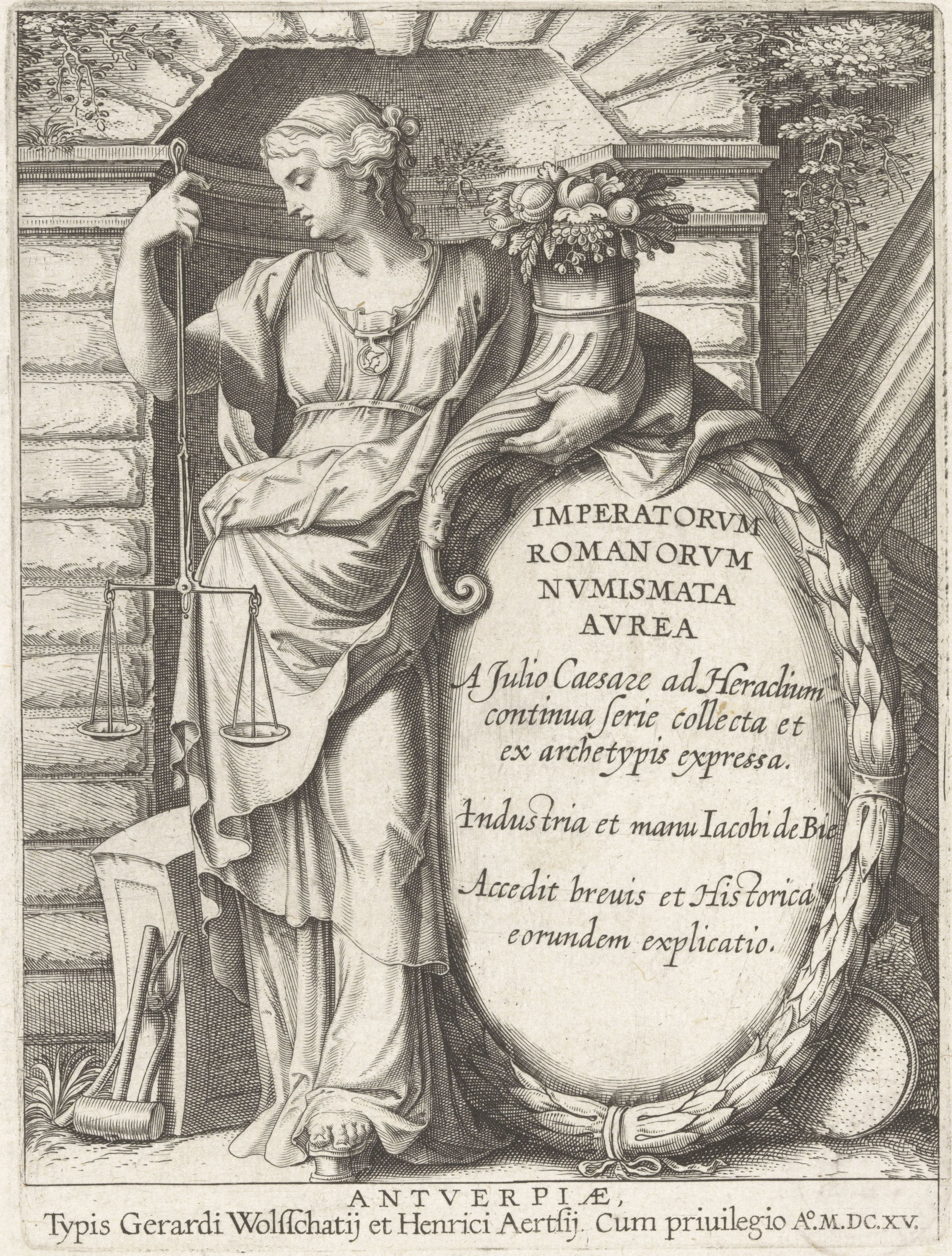
Frontispiece of Jacob de Bie's Imperatorum Romanorum Numismata Aurea a Julio Cæsare Ad Heraclium Continua Serie Collecta on de Croÿ's coin collection

The albums bring together nearly 2,500 gouaches delicately executed, representing as many villages. They cover a very extensive perimeter, encompassing many areas from the north of present-day France and Belgium, from the former principalities of Artois, Hainaut and Namur to the Duchy of Aarschot, the valleys of the rivers Scheldt, the Lys and the Sambre. The Albums offer one of the most important testimonies for the topographical knowledge of the towns and villages of the former Spanish Netherlands.

=== Numismatic collection ===
Around 1610 he appointed the Antwerp engraver and publisher Jacob de Bie as keeper of his extensive ancient coin collection. Jacob de Bie moved to Brussels where the Duke was living and began to work on an edition of the collection.

Charles died in January 1612 before Jacob de Bie had finished the edition, which only appeared in 1615 in Antwerp under the title Imperatorum Romanorum Numismata Aurea a Julio Cæsare Ad Heraclium Continua Serie Collecta. It contained 64 plates reproducing the Roman coin collection of Charles.

== Sources ==
- Arnold van Tiegem, ridder-bisschop by Arnold Smits
- Marek, Miroslav. "genealogy". Genealogy.EU.
- Genealogy (in French)
