= Anthony of Glymes =

1st Margrave of Bergen (1500–1541)

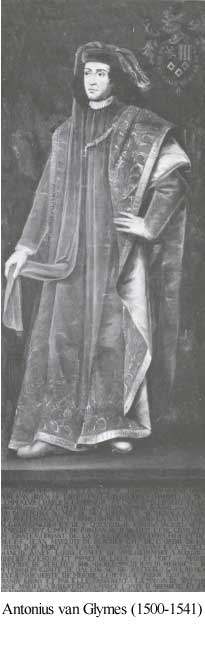
Anthony, a knight of the Golden Fleece

Anthony of Glymes or Anton van Bergen, Lord of Grimbergen, Count of Walhain (1500–1541) was the 1st Margrave of Bergen (op Zoom).

== Family ==
Anthony was the son of John III of Glymes and a grandson of Guy of Brimeu. He was the uncle of Philip II, Count of Nassau-Wiesbaden and brother in law of Adolf of Burgundy. He married in 1521 to Jacqueline of Croÿ, the sister of Philippe II de Croÿ. He became the father of Robert of Berghes, prince Bishop of liege and John IV of Glymes, who succeeded him as marquess.

== Career ==
Like others Anthony had a military career; he was Captain general of Luxemburg. In 1532 he became Count of Walhain by imperial decree.

The next year, in 1533, he was elevated: Berghes was created marquessate by imperial decree of Charles VI. He inherited Croy Castle from the family of his wife. He was a diplomate and Chargé d'affaires of the Imperial Court. He was knight of the Golden Fleece.
