= Ignace-François de Glymes-Brabant, Lord of la Falize =

Flemish noble and general (1677–1755)

Ignace-François de Glymes-Brabant (Namur, 29 March 1677 - 5 December 1754) was a Flemish born general in the service of Imperial Spain.

== Family ==
He was born one of the 12 children of Gilles II Alexis de Glymes-Brabant, Lord of la Falize at Namur, then part of the Spanish Netherlands. His grandmother Marie-Elisabeth of Nassau-Corroy, was the daughter of Alexis II of Nassau-Corroy, great-grandson of Henry III of Nassau-Breda.
He married in 1723 Marie-Francoise de Warigny and had 2 sons:

- Honoré de Glymes-Brabant (1725-1804); Viceroy of Navarre in 1765:
  married to Marie-Theodore, daughter of Charles I Emmanuel, 1st Prince de Gavre.
- Jean-Alexis de Glymes-Brabant: Abbot in Dinant.

== Career ==
He came earlier to Spain as a colonel of a Walloon Regiment financed by Imperial Spain, to fight in the Spanish War of Succession in 1703. He participated in the siege of Gibraltar (1704–1705), the Battle of Almansa and the sieges of Tortosa and Tarragona in 1711, where he was promoted to the rank of lieutenant general.

His greatest victories as a lieutenant general were the battles of Messina and Francavilla, fought during the War of the Quadruple Alliance (1717-1721) for the Spanish expeditionary army over the Austrian imperial army in Sicily.

He was Military Governor of Tortosa in 1715, Captain General of Old Castile in 1727 and the Captain General of Catalonia (1735–1743), being substituted for the period 1737-1738 by Prospero Jorge de Verboom.

In 1743 he was made 1st Count of Glimes de Brabante by King Philip V of Spain.
He died in Madrid on 5 December 1754.
