= John IV of Glymes =

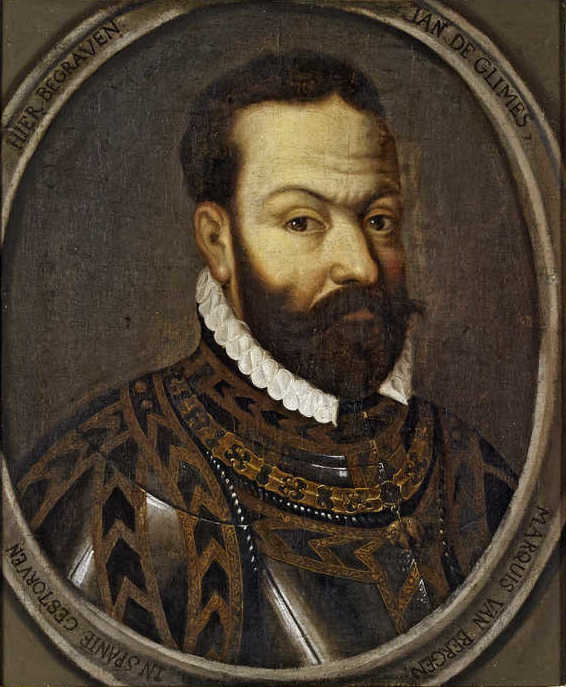
Portrait of John IV van Glymes (1528–1567)

John IV of Glymes, 2nd Marquess of Berghes (1528–1567), Grand Huntsman of Brabant, was a noble from the Low Countries.

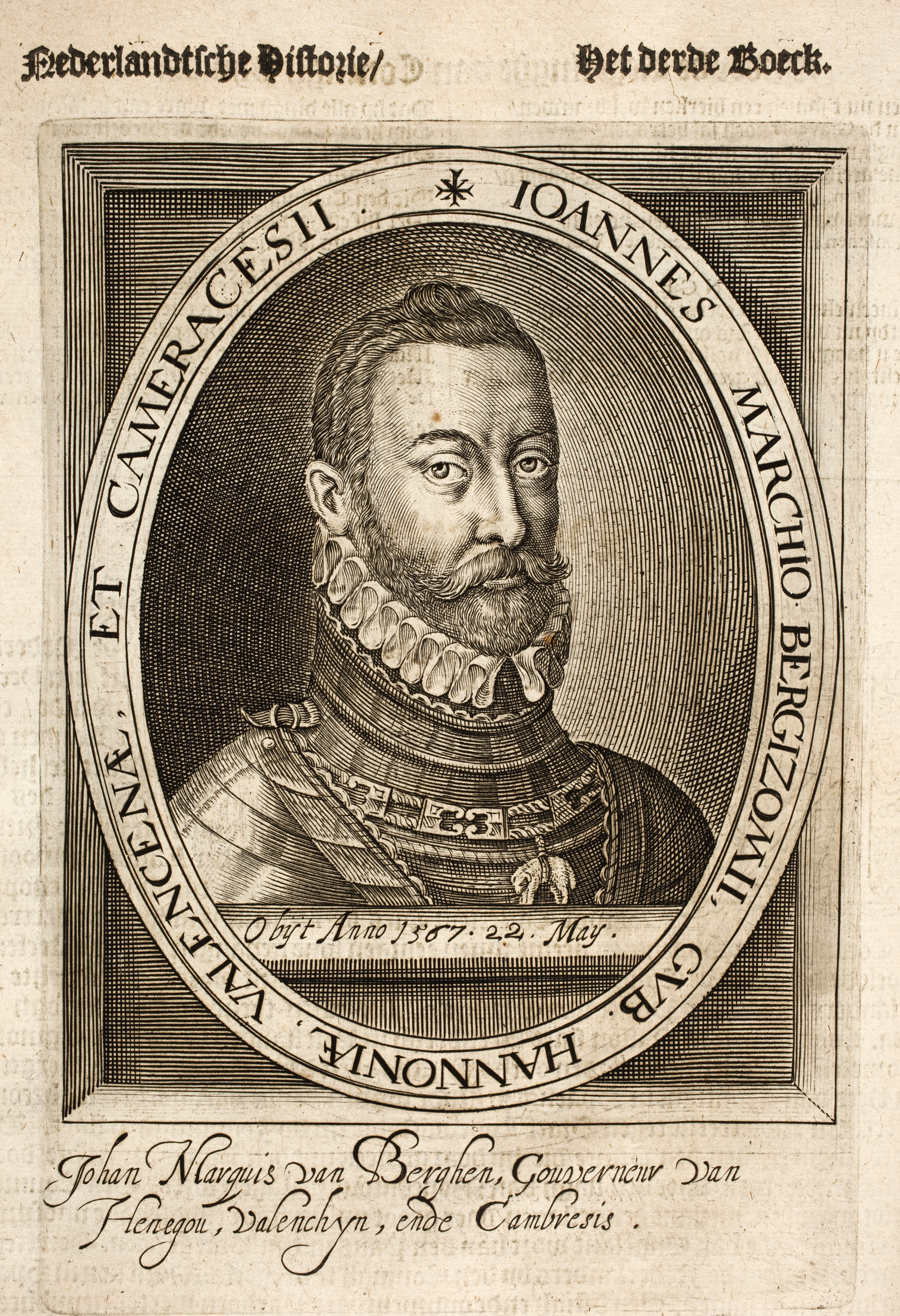
John IV of Glymes

He was the son of Anthony of Glymes (1500–1541) and Jacqueline de Croÿ, sister of Philippe II de Croÿ. He succeeded his father as Lord of Bergen op Zoom in 1541 under regency of his mother.

As his ancestors, John IV was an important political figure of his time. In 1550, he married Maria of Lannoy, daughter of Jan van Lannoy, a Knight in the Order of the Golden Fleece. They had no surviving children. In 1554 he was sent to England, together with Lamoral, Count of Egmont, to arrange the marriage between Philip II of Spain and Mary I of England.
He participated in the War against France and was rewarded with the Order of the Golden Fleece in 1556. Four years later, he was appointed Stadtholder of Hainault. He was also a member of the Council of state.

When the tensions between King Philip II, represented by his minister Antoine Perrenot de Granvelle, and the nobility of the Low Countries increased, he was part of the group that obtained the Granvelle's return to Burgundy. Although he had actively participated in the elaboration of the Compromise of Nobles, which was ignored by King Philip, he did not sign it.

Glymes resigned as a Stadtholder in January 1566, together with William of Orange, Floris of Montmorency, Lamoral, Count of Egmont and Philip de Montmorency, Count of Horn.

In April 1566, he was sent with Floris of Montmorency to Spain in a last attempt to avoid war. He was wounded on the leg before leaving, when he was hit by a wooden ball whilst passing a ballgame, and died from complications in Segovia on 23 May 1567. By then, the Beeldenstorm had already raged across the Low Countries and the Duke of Alba was on his way to the Low Countries to "restore the order".

== Sources ==
- Alphonse Le Roy, Berghes (Jean de Glymes, marquis de), Biographie nationale de Belgique, T. 2, 1868, col. 221ss (French).
- Willem van Ham, Jan IV van Glymes, markies van Bergen op Zoom, Dutch revolt, Universiteit Leyden (Dutch).
