= John III of Glymes =

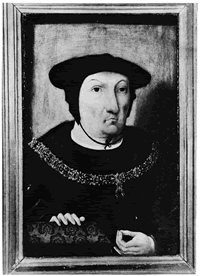
Portrait of John III van Glymes (1452–1532)

John III, Lord of Bergen op Zoom or John III of Glymes (1452 – 1532, in Brussels) was a noble from the Low Countries.

He was the son of John II of Glymes and Margaret of Rouveroy and succeeded his father as Lord of Bergen op Zoom. In 1494 he purchased the Croy Castle.

As his father, John III was an important political figure of his time. He was First Chamberlain at the Burgundian-Habsburg Court of Maximilian of Austria, Philip the Handsome, and Emperor Charles V. He became a Knight in the Order of the Golden Fleece and was sent in 1508 to England to arrange the marriage between Charles V and Mary Tudor. However, changes in the political alliances of the European powers meant this wedding never took place.

John III was advisor of Margaret of Austria, who was Governor of the Habsburg Netherlands between 1507–1515 and 1519–1530. He also corresponded with Maximilian II, Holy Roman Emperor, Thomas More, Desiderius Erasmus, Thomas Wolsey and King Henry VIII of England.

He was a member of the Secret Council of Mechelen, Dean of the Order of the Golden Fleece, chairman of the Council of Court and executor of the last will of Margaret of Austria (1480–1530). John died in Brussels in 1532.

He married in 1487 with Adriana of Brimeu, daughter of Guy and had :

- John of Glymes of Bergen (1489–1514), killed in a duel.
- Anna of Glymes of Bergen (1492–1541), married Adolf of Burgundy.
- Adriana of Glymes of Bergen (1495–1524), married Philip I, Count of Nassau-Wiesbaden-Idstein
- Philip of Glymes (1498–1525)
- Antony of Glymes (1500–1541), his successor.
