= House van de Werve =

Van de Werve
- noble family
- Van de Werve family
- Country: Belgium
- Titles: Count of Vorsselaer
- Estate: Borrekens Castle
- Cadet branches: van de Werve de Vorsselaer; van de Werve de Schilde; van de Werve d'Immerseel.

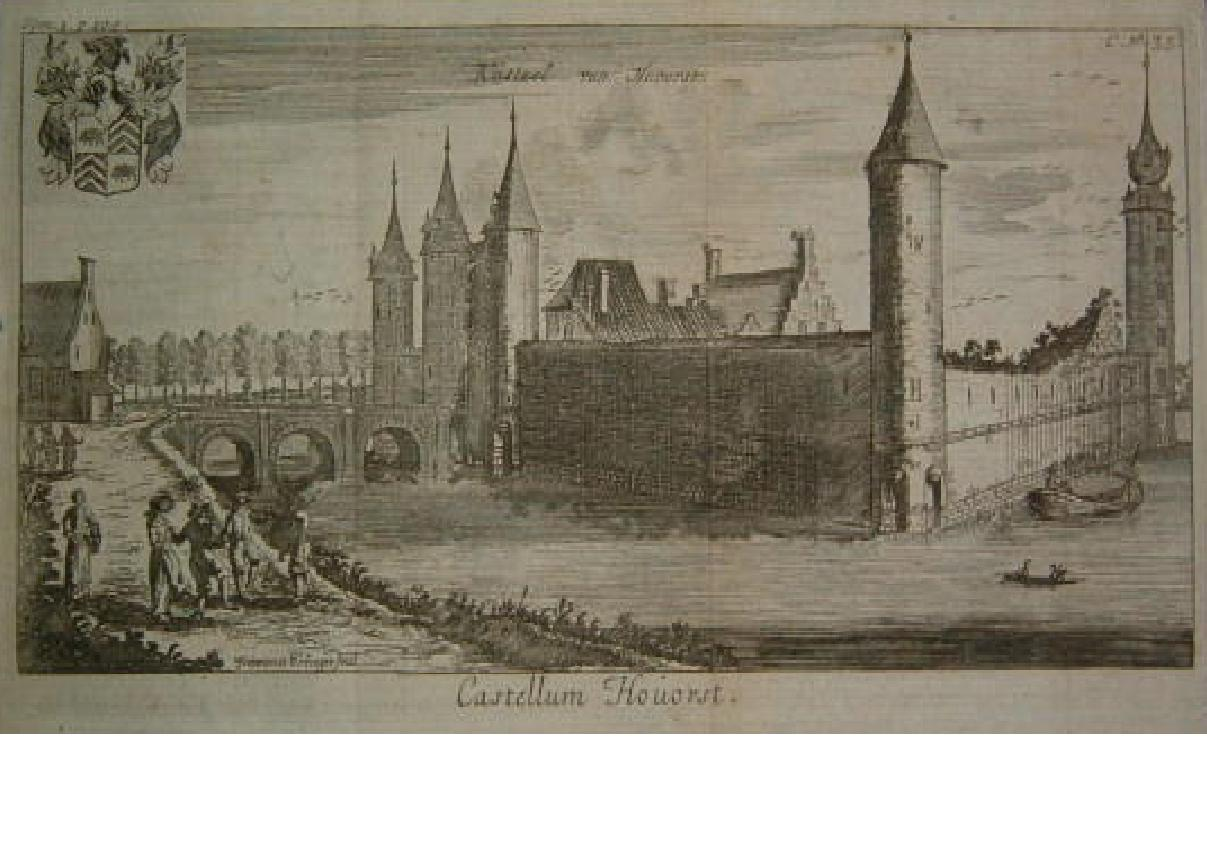
Hovorst Castle, residence of the House of van de Werve.

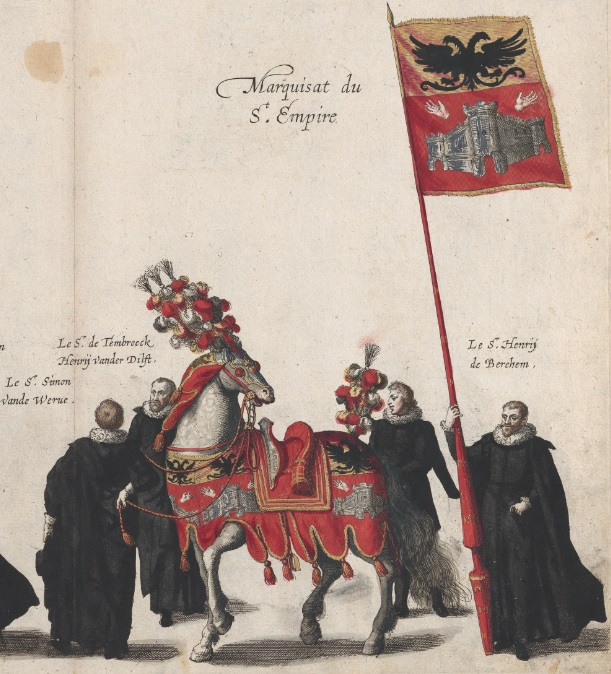
the Marquess of Antwerp symbolised in the funeral procession of Albert VII

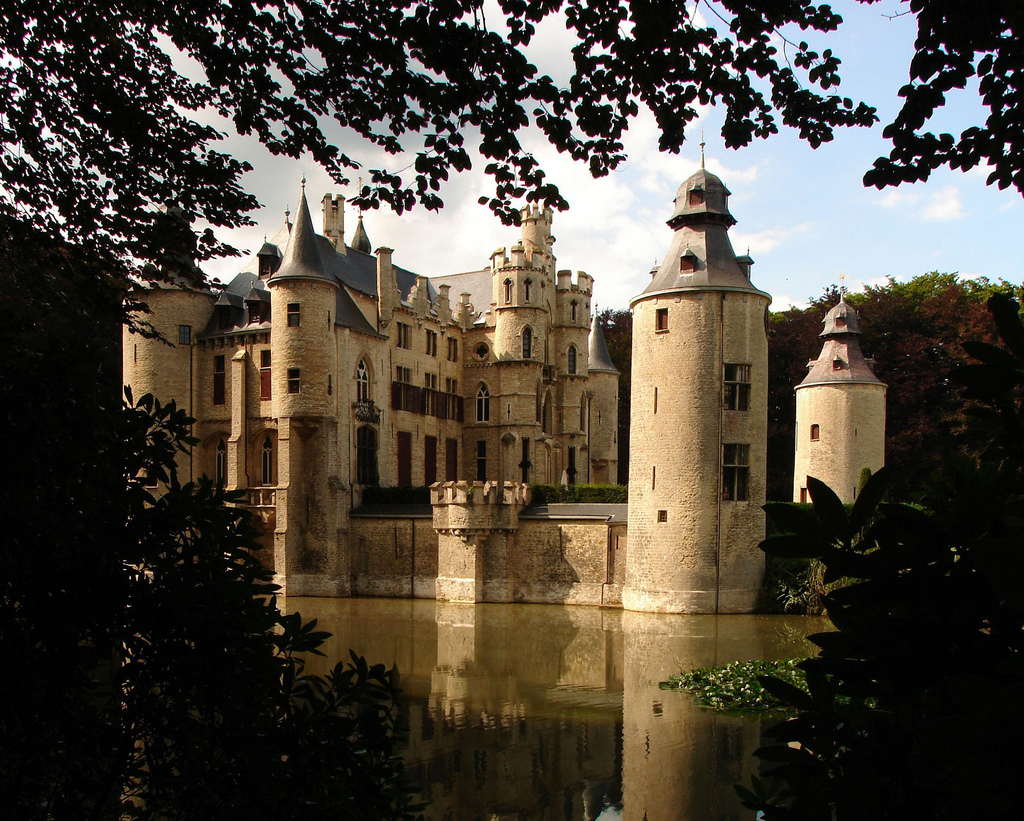
De Borrekens Castle

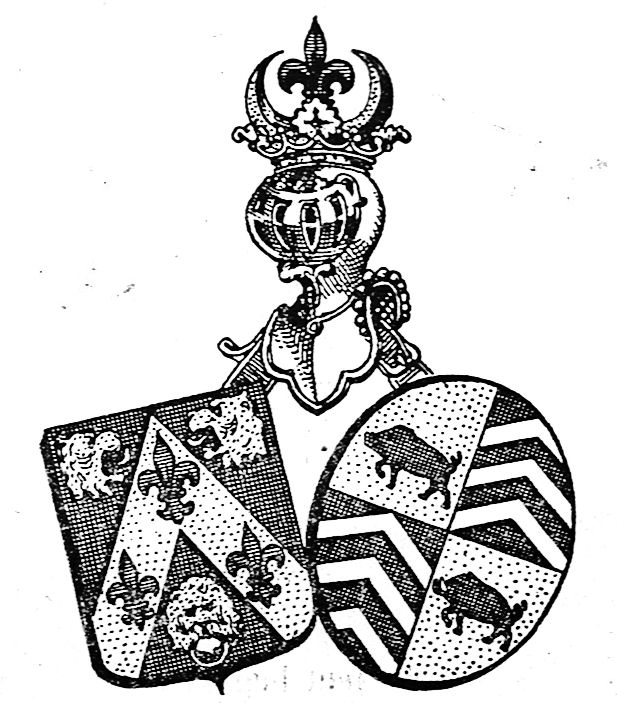
Jean-Baptiste della Faille, mayor of Antwerp. Married van de werve, Crest

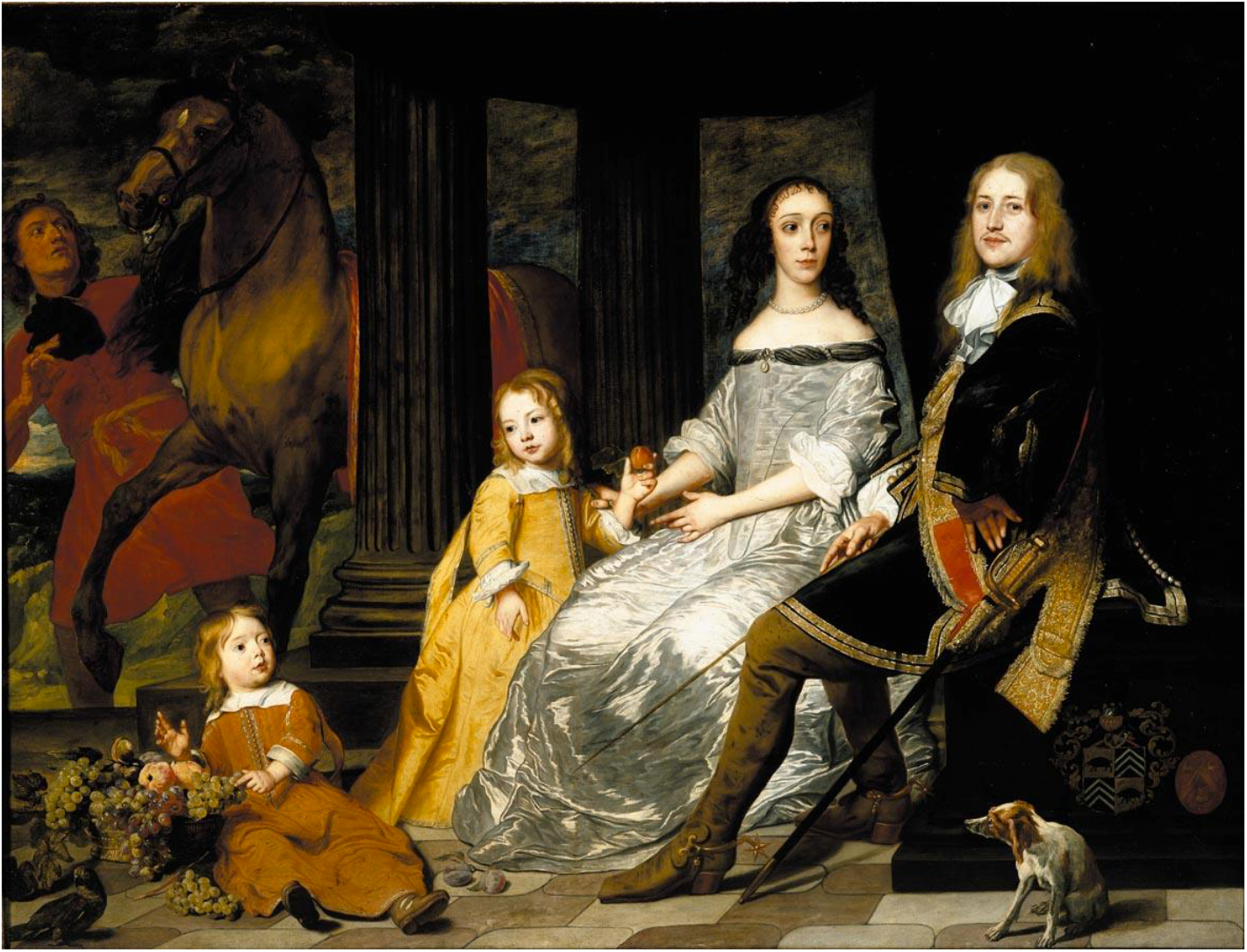
Philip, (son of Simon van de Werve and Robertine Robert de Robersart) and his wife: portrait painted by Pieter Thijs

The Van de Werve family is one of the oldest Belgian noble families from Antwerp that is still in existence.

== History ==
This family is known to be one of the oldest noble families of Flanders. For centuries years they have played an important part in the local history of their many possessions. These include the lordships of Hovorst, Massenhoven, Viersel, Bouchaut, Vremdeyck, Immerseel, Schilde, Gyssenoudekercke, Kontick, Westkerck, Spierenbroeck, Sint Maria Ghestele, Voorschootte, Terweer, Lichtaerd and Vorsselaer.

=== Notable members ===
Over time, many members married into other very important noble families such as Schetz, Tucher, Ursel and Brimeu.

- Guilliame van de Werve, Lord of Immerseel became 1st Viscount of Immerseel in 1686, by decree of Charles II of Spain.
- Charles III Philippe van de Werve (1706–1776) inherited the lordship of Vorrselaer from his father-in-law in 1767. He became count in 1768 and his eldest son sired the branch van de Werve de Vorsselaer.

=== Estates ===
Diederik van de Werve was the original Resident of D'Ursel Castle, his descendants sold it to Conrad III Schetz in 1608.

Another important residence is Borrekens Castle in Vorselaar, for generations private estate.

The most important burials took place in St. James' Church, Antwerp.

== Genealogy ==
=== Early Knights ===
1. Raimondt I van de Werve, is mentioned as father of:
  1. Gunther van de Werve, married to Getrudis of Ranst, daughter of Arnoult Berthout, Lord of Ranst. He is mentioned as father of
    1. James or Jacques van de Werve, mayor in 1270: married Gommara of Liere.
      1. Guilliam van de Werve, married to Beatrix de la Marche, named Beatrix Sanglier, daughter of Guy.
        1. John I van de Werve, married Ida daughter of Gilles of Hoboken, MArquess of Antwerp.
          1. Raimondt II van de Werve, married Isabella Triclandt, daughter of Gilles.
            1. John II van de Werve, died 1389, married Claira of Wyneghem.
              1. Nicolas I van de Werve, 1st Lord of Hovorst, see further.

=== Genealogy of The Lords of Hovorst, Giesenoudekercke and Westkercke ===
1. Nicolas I van de Werve, 1st Lord of Hovorst, Called Claas married 1st Mary of Duffel, Lady of Thielen, 2nd Catherine of Wilre.
  1. Catherine van de Werve, married Peter of Hambroeck, Marquess of Antwerp.
  2. Nicolaas II van de Werve, married Catherine Mickaert.
    1. Peter van de Werve, married Catherine of Herbais.
      1. Simon I van de Werve, married Catharine of Tuyl.
        1. Henry I van de Werve, married Lady van cuyck.
          1. Simon II van de Werve, Marques of Antwerp: married 1st Elsabeth vander Haept, 2nd Catherine vander Noot, 3rd Walburga vander Aa.
            1. Simon III van de Werve, married Robertine Robert de Robersart.
              1. Philip van de Werve, married Lady Isabelle-Françoise Charles.
          2. Diederik I van de Werve, Mayor of Antwerp: married Catherine of Vaernewyck.
            1. Henry II van de Werve, Lord of Westkercke: married Mary Taats van Amerongen.
              1. Diederik II van de Werve, Lord of Westkercke: married Digna van Bleeswyck
                1. Cornelie van de Werve: Married to her cousin Charles I Bruno van de Werve, Lord of Schilde.
                  1. Charles II Henri van de Werve, Lord of Schilde, descendants, see further.
    2. Geertuid van de Werve, married Waltherus Draeck, parents of Willem Draeck, Lord of Merksem, mayor of Antwerp.
  3. Michael van de Werve, 2nd Lord of Hovorst, married Catherine of Moirtsele.
    1. Henry van de Werve, 3rd Lord of Hovorst, married Margharethe of Wymaer.
  4. Arnoult I van de Werve, married Mathilda Pots.
    1. Nicolaas III van de Werve, Lord of Giesenoudekercke: married Magdalene of Halmale.
      1. Arnoult II van de Werve, Lord of Giesenoudekercke, died 1510: Married Bartha of Loon.
        1. François van de Werve, Lord of Giesenoudekercke: married Machteld van Bronckhorst.
          1. Joost van de Werve, Lord of Giesenoudekercke: married Geetruid van Tuyl.
  5. Guilliam van de Werve, knighted, died 1460: married Catherine van Coelputt.
    1. Rassche van de Werve, married Catharine Collyns.
      1. Guilliam van de Werve, Lord of Schilde: married Margharetha Schyff.
        1. Charles van de Werve, Lord of schilde: married to Anna Schetz, granddaughter of Erasmus II Schetz.
          1. John van de Werve, Marr. Machteld van de Werve.

==== Descendant of Henry and Marghareth of Wymaer ====
1. Henry van de Werve, 4th Lord of Hovorst, died 1477; married Margharethe of Weymaer, Weimar.
  1. Gerald van de Werve, 5th Lord of Hovorst, died 1534; mayor in 1521; married Anne of Mechelen, daughter of Henri, mayor of Antwerp.
    1. John III van de Werve, 6th Lord of Hovorst, (1522-1576), died in the Sack of Antwerp. Married to Claire Rockox, aunt of Nicolaas II Rockox and became the uncle of Lancelot II of Ursel.
    2. Arnoult III van de Werve, Mayor of Antwerp, married Adrienne de Lierre, Lady of Immerseel.
    3. Catherine van de Werve, married Constantin of Halmale, Lord Mayor of Antwerp.
      1. John IV van de Werve, 7th Lord of Hovorst, died 1622, Governor of Deinze, married, Josseline Lomelini, lady-in-waiting to the Archduchess Isabella Clara Eugenia
        1. Auguste van de Werve, 8th Lord of Hovorst, died 1647; married Mary Anne van de Werve, daughter of Guilliam van de Werve, Lord of Schilde.
        2. Henri van de Werve, mayor of Antwerp in 1663.
        3. Isabelle Anne van de Werve, married John Baptiste della Faille, mayor of Antwerp.
  2. Martin van de Werve, married Mary of Ursel, sister of Lancelot II of Ursel.
    1. Anne van de Werve, married to Jacques de Brimeu, Lord of Poederlee.
      1. Maria of Brimeu, Lady of Poederlee: married to Conrad II Schetz, Lord of Grobbendoncq.
        1. Julianne Schetz, married to Robrecht Tucher, knight and Lord mayor of Antwerp.
  3. John van de Werve, Lord of Saint-Michael-Ghestel, mayor of Antwerp, married Catherine Oem van Wyngaerden. No heirs.

=== Lords of Schilde and Vorsselaer ===
1. Auguste I van de Werve, 8th Lord of Hovorst, died 1647, married Mary Anne van de Werve.
  1. Raymond van de Werve, Lord of Vremdyck
    1. Guilliam Raymond van de Werve, Viscount of Immerseel.
  2. Charles I Bruno van de Werve, Lord of schilde, (1627-1696): married Cornelie van de Werve.
    1. Charles II Henri van de Werve, Lord of Schilde, (1627–1696).
      1. Charles Philippe Joseph van de Werve, Lord of Gyssenkercke, died in the Battle of Velletri, no heirs.
      2. Charles III Philippe van de Werve, 1st Count of Vorsselaer, (1706–1776): married Marie-Anne de Pret.
        1. Charles IV Bernard van de Werve, 2nd Count of Vorsselaer,(1740–1813): married Hubertine de Gilman.
          1. Auguste II van de Werve, (1764–1793): baron of Lichtaert: married Marie-Anne van Colen.
            1. Reine Anne Marie Josepha van de Werve, (1789-1864)
            2. Charles V Augustin van de Werve, 3rd Count of Vosselaer, (1786-1862)
            3. Louis Paul François van de Werve, 4th Count of Vorsselaer, (1791-1850): married Jeanne Gillès de Pelichy.
              1. Joanne Louise Marie Josephine van de Werve, married Henri Philip, Count of Brouchoven de Bergeyck.
              2. Philippe II Marie Joseph Herman van de Werve, married Léocadie Geelhand (1817-1866).
                1. René-Philippe van de Werve, (1850–1911): Member of the Belgian Senate.
                2. Léon van de Werve (1851-1920): married Irène Kervyn d'Oud Mooreghem (1857-1938).
                  1. Fernand van de Werve, (1876-1958): married Blanche de Lichtervelde.
                    1. Jacques van de Werve de Vorsselaer: married Béatrice de Faestraets (1925-2002).
                  2. Raoul van de Werve de Vorsselaer: Married Hedwige de Ramaix.
                    1. André van de Werve de Vorsselaer: Belgian Olympic fencer.
              3. Auguste III Marie Joseph François van de Werve, (1821-1873): married Marie Louise du Bois de Nevele.
                1. Auguste IV van de Werve, (1854-1922): mayor of Viersel. Married to Edith della Faille de Leverghem.
            4. Philippe I Louis van de Werve, 1st Baron of Schilde, married 3rd to Marie-Louise della Faille.
              1. Jacques van de Werve, 2nd Baron of Schilde, (1793–1845): married Charlotte de Cossé-Brissac.
                1. Henri van de Werve et de Schilde, married Jeanne de Béthisy.
                  1. Gaston van de Werve et de Schilde, (1867-1923): governor of the province of Antwerp, married Françoise de la Boëssière-Thiennes.
      3. Eleonore Mary Carolina van de Werve, died 1726: married 2nd Don Ferdinand, Marquess of la Puente and Count of Rhode.
      4. Gertrude Magdalene Rose van de Werve, died 1734: married to her uncle Philip Adrien de Varick.
  3. Guilliam François van de Werve, married Anne Margharethe ´t Seraerts.
  4. Mary Anne van de Werve, married Philip François de Varick, Lord of Boondaele.

== Website ==
- Official website of the House
