= Augustin van de Werve =

Armes of the count of Vorselaar

Auguste II Marie Henri van de Werve (1764–1793), baron of Lichtaert, formed part of a noble family of Antwerp.

== Family ==
Augustin was the only child of Charles IV Bernard van de Werve, 2nd Count of Vosselaer and countess née Hubertine de Gilman. When his father inherited the title of count of Vorsselaer, Augustin became baron of Lichtaert as wire elder of the count of Vorsselaer. He would never become Count, however, as he died before his father.

== Descendants ==
In 1784 he married Marie-Anne van Colen, daughter of Charles-Joseph van Colen

- Maria Theresia Joanne Josepha van de Werve, (1785-1854): Married Louis Nicolas de Haultepenne.
- Reine Anne Marie Josepha van de Werve, (1789-1864) married Charles della Faille, (1784-1849)
- Charles V Augustin van de Werve, Count of Vosselaer, (1786-1862)
- Philip Louis Ignace Josephe Marie van de Werve, BAron of Schilde: Married 1st Marie de Fraula, 2nd Therese Peeters, 3rd Marie Louise della Faille.
  - Jacques Joseph Marie de Paule van de Werve, married Charlotte de Cosse.
- Louis Paul François van de Werve, Count of Vorsselaer, (1791-1850), married Jeanne Gillès de Pelichy.
  - Cajetan Louis Maria Joseph van de Werve, married Florence Ullens de Schoten.
  - Philippe Marie Joseph Herman van de Werve, married Léocadie Geelhand (1817-1866).
    - René-Philippe van de Werve, (1850–1911): married Louise Bosschaert (1855-1888).
    - Léon van de Werve (1851-1920): married Irène Kervyn d'Oud Mooreghem (1857-1938).
      - Fernand van de Werve, (1876-1958): married Blanche de Lichtervelde.

Augustin van de Werve House of van de Werve Born: 7 August 1764 Died: 27 July 1793
Regnal titles
Preceded by Charles IV Bernhard	Baron of Lichtaert and of Rielen; 1776-1793	Succeeded by Charles V Auguste
