= June 24 =

June 24 this year in various calendars
- Wednesday, 24 June 2026
Akan	Nkyiwukuo
Armenian	9 Hrotich 1475
Aztec	Tepeilhuitl 5, 10 Ācatl
Babylonian	8 Simanu, 2337 SE
Balinese pawukon	Menga, Kajeng, Jaya, Paing, Urukung, Buda of Kuningan, Kala, Erangan, Manusa
Bengali	10 Asharh, BS 1433
Chinese	Yin Earth Snake・Chariot Mansion; Fire Horse Year, Month 5, Day 10 (Xiazhi, 13 days until Xiaoshu)
Common Era	24 June 2026 CE
Coptic	17 Paoni, AM 1742
Egyptian	9 Athyr, 2775 NE
Ethiopian	17 Sanē, 2018 Amätä Məhrät
French Republican	Décade I, Sextidi de Messidor de l'Année 234 de la République
Gregorian	24 June, AD 2026
Hebrew	9 Tamuz, AM 5786
Hindu	Citrā・Parigha; Solar: 10 Āṣāḍha, 1948 SE; Lunisolar: Daśamī, Śukla pakṣa of Jyeṣṭha, 2083 VE; Rāudra・5127 KY・1,872,750
Icelandic	Miðvikudagur, 3 Sólmánuður 2026
Islamic	8 Muharram, AH 1448 (using tabular method)
ISO week date	2026-W26-3
Japanese	10 Satsuki, Reiwa 8 (Geshi, 13 days until Shōsho)
Julian	11 June, AD 2026 (AM 7534)
Julian day	2461216
Korean	10 Maldal, 4359 DE
Maya	13.0.13.12.13; 6 Tzec, 10 Ben
Roman	ante diem III Idus Iunias, MMDCCLXXIX AUC
Solar Hijri	3 Tir, SH 1405
Tibetan	10 snron, me pho rta 2153 or 1772 or 1000

<<	June					>>
Su	Mo	Tu	We	Th	Fr	Sa
	1	2	3	4	5	6
7	8	9	10	11	12	13
14	15	16	17	18	19	20
21	22	23	24	25	26	27
28	29	30
2026

June 24 in recent years
2026 (Wednesday)
2025 (Tuesday)
2024 (Monday)
2023 (Saturday)
2022 (Friday)
2021 (Thursday)
2020 (Wednesday)
2019 (Monday)
2018 (Sunday)
2017 (Saturday)

June 24 is the 175th day of the year (176th in leap years) in the Gregorian calendar; 190 days remain until the end of the year.

== Events ==
=== Pre-1600 ===
- 1312 BC – Mursili II launches a campaign against the Kingdom of Azzi-Hayasa.
- 109 – Roman emperor Trajan inaugurates the Aqua Traiana, an aqueduct that channels water from Lake Bracciano, 40 kilometres (25 miles) northwest of Rome.
- 474 – Julius Nepos forces Roman usurper Glycerius to abdicate the throne and proclaims himself Emperor of the Western Roman Empire.
- 637 – The Battle of Moira is fought between the High King of Ireland and the Kings of Ulster and Dál Riata. It is claimed to be the largest battle in the history of Ireland.
- 843 – The Vikings sack the French city of Nantes.
- 972 – Battle of Cedynia, the first documented victory of Polish forces, takes place.
- 1128 – Battle of São Mamede, near Guimarães: Forces led by Afonso I defeat forces led by his mother Teresa of León and her lover Fernando Pérez de Traba.
- 1230 – The Siege of Jaén begins, in the context of the Spanish Reconquista.
- 1314 – First War of Scottish Independence: The Battle of Bannockburn concludes with a decisive victory by Scottish forces led by Robert the Bruce.
- 1340 – Hundred Years' War: Battle of Sluys: The French fleet is almost completely destroyed by the English fleet commanded personally by King Edward III.
- 1374 – A sudden outbreak of St. John's Dance causes people in the streets of Aachen, Germany, to experience hallucinations and begin to jump and twitch uncontrollably until they collapse from exhaustion.
- 1497 – John Cabot lands in North America at Newfoundland leading the first European exploration of the region since the Vikings.
- 1509 – Henry VIII and Catherine of Aragon are crowned King and Queen of England.
- 1520 – The Field of the Cloth of Gold, a summit meeting between Henry VIII of England and Francis I of France, ends.
- 1535 – The Anabaptist state of Münster is conquered and disbanded.
- 1540 – English King Henry VIII commands his fourth wife, Anne of Cleves, to leave the court.
- 1571 – Miguel López de Legazpi conquers Manila for Spain, modern day capital of the Philippines.
- 1593 – The Dutch city of Geertruidenberg held by the Spanish, capitulates to a besieging Dutch and English army led by Maurice of Nassau.

=== 1601–1900 ===
- 1604 – Samuel de Champlain encounters the mouth of the Saint John River, site of Reversing Falls and the present-day city of Saint John, New Brunswick, Canada.
- 1622 – Battle of Macau: The Dutch make a failed attempt to capture Macau.
- 1663 – The Spanish garrison of Évora capitulates, following the Portuguese victory at the Battle of Ameixial.
- 1713 – The treaty of Adrianople ends the Russo-Turkish War of 1710–1713, which restores territory to the Ottomans while allowing the Russians to focus on their war against the Swedes.
- 1717 – The Premier Grand Lodge of England is founded in London, the first Masonic Grand Lodge in the world (now the United Grand Lodge of England).
- 1724 – On the Feast of St. John the Baptist, Bach leads the first performance of his Christ unser Herr zum Jordan kam, BWV 7, the third cantata of his chorale cantata cycle.
- 1762 – Battle of Wilhelmsthal: The British-Hanoverian army of Ferdinand of Brunswick defeats French forces in Westphalia.
- 1779 – American Revolutionary War: The Great Siege of Gibraltar begins.
- 1793 – The first Republican constitution in France is adopted.
- 1812 – Napoleonic Wars: Napoleon's Grande Armée crosses the Neman river beginning the invasion of Russia.
- 1813 – Battle of Beaver Dams: A British and Indian combined force defeats the United States Army.
- 1821 – Battle of Carabobo: Decisive battle in the war of independence of Venezuela from Spain.
- 1839 – An Egyptian army under Ibrahim Pascha routs an Ottoman army under Hafiz Pasha in the battle of Nezib.
- 1859 – Battle of Solferino (Battle of the Three Sovereigns): Sardinia and France defeat Austria in Solferino, northern Italy.
- 1866 – Austro-Prussian War: In the Battle of Custoza an Austrian army defeats the Italian army.
- 1880 – First performance of O Canada at the Congrès national des Canadiens-Français. The song would later become the national anthem of Canada.
- 1894 – Assassination of the French President, Sadi Carnot by Sante Caserio during the Ère des attentats (1892–1894).

=== 1901–present ===
- 1913 – Greece and Serbia annul their alliance with Bulgaria.
- 1916 – Mary Pickford becomes the first female film star to sign a million-dollar contract.
- 1918 – First airmail service in Canada from Montreal to Toronto.
- 1922 – The American Professional Football Association is renamed the National Football League.
- 1932 – A bloodless revolution instigated by the People's Party ends the absolute power of King Prajadhipok of Siam (now Thailand).
- 1939 – Siam is renamed Thailand by Plaek Phibunsongkhram, the country's third prime minister.
- 1940 – World War II: Operation Collar, the first British Commando raid on occupied France, by No 11 Independent Company.
- 1943 – US military police attempt to arrest a black soldier in Bamber Bridge, England, sparking the Battle of Bamber Bridge mutiny that leaves one dead and seven wounded.
- 1945 – The first Victory Day Parade takes place on Red Square in Moscow, Soviet Union, symbolizing the victory of the Soviet Union over Nazi Germany.
- 1947 – Kenneth Arnold makes the first widely reported UFO sighting near Mount Rainier, Washington.
- 1948 – Cold War: Start of the Berlin Blockade: The Soviet Union makes overland travel between West Germany and West Berlin impossible.
- 1949 – The first television western, Hopalong Cassidy, starring William Boyd, is aired on NBC.
- 1950 – Apartheid: In South Africa, the Group Areas Act is passed, formally segregating races.
- 1954 – First Indochina War: Battle of Mang Yang Pass: Viet Minh troops belonging to the 803rd Regiment ambush G.M. 100 of France in An Khê.
- 1957 – In Roth v. United States, the U.S. Supreme Court rules that obscenity is not protected by the First Amendment.
- 1960 – Venezuelan President Rómulo Betancourt is injured in an assassination attempt.
- 1963 – The United Kingdom grants Zanzibar internal self-government.
- 1973 – The UpStairs Lounge arson attack takes place at a gay bar located on the second floor of the three-story building at 141 Chartres Street in the French Quarter of New Orleans, Louisiana, US. Thirty-two people die as a result of fire or smoke inhalation.
- 1975 – Eastern Air Lines Flight 66 encounters severe wind shear and crashes on final approach to New York's JFK Airport killing 113 of the 124 passengers on board, making it the deadliest U.S. plane crash at the time. This accident led to decades of research into downburst and microburst phenomena and their effects on aircraft.
- 1978 – Ahmad al-Ghashmi, the president of the Yemen Arab Republic, is killed when a bomb exploded in a suitcase carried by a South Yemeni envoy.
- 1981 – The Humber Bridge opens to traffic, connecting Yorkshire and Lincolnshire. It remained the world's longest bridge span for 17 years.
- 1982 – "The Jakarta Incident": British Airways Flight 009 flies into a cloud of volcanic ash thrown up by the eruption of Mount Galunggung, resulting in the failure of all four engines.
- 1989 – Jiang Zemin succeeds Zhao Ziyang to become the General Secretary of the Chinese Communist Party after the 1989 Tiananmen Square protests and massacre.
- 1994 – A Boeing B-52 Stratofortress crashes at Fairchild Air Force Base near Spokane, Washington, killing four.
- 1995 – Rugby World Cup: South Africa defeats New Zealand and Nelson Mandela presents Francois Pienaar with the Webb Ellis Cup in an iconic post-apartheid moment.
- 2002 – The Igandu train disaster in Tanzania kills 281, the worst train accident in African history.
- 2004 – In New York, capital punishment is declared unconstitutional.
- 2010 – At Wimbledon, John Isner of the United States defeats Nicolas Mahut of France, in the longest match in professional tennis history.
- 2010 – Julia Gillard assumes office as the first female Prime Minister of Australia.
- 2012 – Death of Lonesome George, the last known individual of Chelonoidis nigra abingdonii, a subspecies of the Galápagos tortoise.
- 2013 – Former Italian Prime Minister Silvio Berlusconi is found guilty of abusing his power and engaging in sex with an underage prostitute, and is sentenced to seven years in prison.
- 2021 – The Champlain Towers South condominium in Surfside, Florida suffers a sudden partial collapse, killing 98 people inside.
- 2022 – In Dobbs v. Jackson Women's Health Organization, the U.S. Supreme Court rules that the U.S. Constitution does not assign the authority to regulate abortions to the federal government, thereby returning such authority to the individual states. This overturns the prior decisions in Roe v. Wade (1973) and Planned Parenthood v. Casey (1992).
- 2023 – The Wagner Group led by Yevgeny Prigozhin launches an insurrection against the Russian government.
- 2026 – Two earthquakes strike Venezuela, leaving more than 2,200 people dead and dozens of others missing.

== Births ==
=== Pre-1600 ===
- 1210 – Count Floris IV of Holland (died 1234)
- 1244 – Henry I, Landgrave of Hesse (died 1308)
- 1254 – Floris V, Count of Holland (died 1296)
- 1257 – Robert de Vere, 6th Earl of Oxford, English nobleman (probable; (died 1331)
- 1314 – Philippa of Hainault Queen of England (died 1369)
- 1322 – Joanna, Duchess of Brabant (died 1406)
- 1343 – Joan of Valois, Queen of Navarre (died 1373)
- 1360 – Nuno Álvares Pereira, Portuguese general
- 1386 – John of Capistrano, Italian priest and saint (died 1456)
- 1465 – Isabella del Balzo, Queen Consort of Naples (died 1533)
- 1485 – Johannes Bugenhagen, Polish-German priest and reformer (died 1558)
- 1485 – Elizabeth of Denmark, Electress of Brandenburg (died 1555)
- 1499 – Johannes Brenz, German theologian and the Protestant Reformer (died 1570)
- 1519 – Theodore Beza, French theologian and scholar (died 1605)
- 1532 – Robert Dudley, 1st Earl of Leicester, English politician (died 1588)
- 1532 – William IV, Landgrave of Hesse-Kassel (died 1573)
- 1535 – Joanna of Austria, Princess of Portugal (died 1573)
- 1546 – Robert Persons, English Jesuit priest, insurrectionist, and author (died 1610)
- 1587 – William Arnold, English-American settler (died 1675)

=== 1601–1900 ===
- 1614 – John Belasyse, 1st Baron Belasyse
- 1616 – Ferdinand Bol, Dutch painter, etcher and draftsman, student of Rembrandt (died 1680)
- 1661 – Hachisuka Tsunanori, Japanese daimyō (died 1730)
- 1663 – Jean Baptiste Massillon, French bishop (died 1742)
- 1687 – Johann Albrecht Bengel, German-Lutheran clergyman and scholar (died 1757)
- 1694 – Jean-Jacques Burlamaqui, Swiss author and theorist (died 1748)
- 1704 – Jean-Baptiste de Boyer, Marquis d'Argens, French philosopher and author (died 1771)
- 1753 – William Hull, American general and politician, 1st Governor of Michigan Territory (died 1825)
- 1755 – Anacharsis Cloots, Prussian-French activist (died 1794)
- 1767 – Jean-Baptiste Benoît Eyriès, French geographer and author (died 1846)
- 1771 – Éleuthère Irénée du Pont, French chemist and businessman, founded DuPont (died 1834)
- 1774 – Antonio González de Balcarce, Argentine commander and politician, 5th Supreme Director of the United Provinces of the Río de la Plata (died 1819)
- 1774 – François-Nicolas-Benoît Haxo, French general and engineer (died 1838)
- 1777 – John Ross, Scottish commander and explorer (died 1856)
- 1782 – Juan Larrea, Argentine captain and politician (died 1847)
- 1783 – Johann Heinrich von Thünen, German economist and geographer (died 1850)
- 1784 – Juan Antonio Lavalleja, Uruguayan general and politician, President of Uruguay (died 1853)
- 1788 – Thomas Blanchard, American inventor (died 1864)
- 1795 – Ernst Heinrich Weber, German physician and psychologist (died 1878)
- 1797 – John Hughes, Irish-American archbishop (died 1864)
- 1797 – Paweł Edmund Strzelecki, Polish geologist and explorer (died 1873)
- 1804 – Stephan Endlicher, Austrian botanist, numismatist, and sinologist (died 1849)
- 1804 – Willard Richards, American religious leader (died 1854)
- 1811 – John Archibald Campbell, American lawyer and jurist (died 1889)
- 1813 – Henry Ward Beecher, American minister and reformer (died 1887)
- 1813 – Francis Boott, American composer (died 1904)
- 1821 – Guillermo Rawson, Argentine physician and politician (died 1890)
- 1826 – George Goyder, English-Australian surveyor (died 1898)
- 1835 – Johannes Wislicenus, German chemist and academic (died 1902)
- 1838 – Jan Matejko, Polish painter (died 1893)
- 1839 – Gustavus Franklin Swift, American businessman (died 1903)
- 1842 – Ambrose Bierce, American short story writer, essayist, and journalist (died 1914)
- 1846 – Samuel Johnson, Nigerian priest and historian (died 1901)
- 1850 – Herbert Kitchener, 1st Earl Kitchener, Irish field marshal and politician, Governor-General of Sudan (died 1916)
- 1852 – Friedrich Loeffler, German bacteriologist and academic (died 1915)
- 1854 – Eleanor Norcross, American painter (died 1923)
- 1856 – Henry Chapman Mercer, American archaeologist and author (died 1930)
- 1858 – Hastings Rashdall, English historian, philosopher, and theologian (died 1924)
- 1865 – Robert Henri, American painter and educator (died 1929)
- 1867 – Ruth Randall Edström, American educator and activist (died 1944)
- 1869 – Prince George of Greece and Denmark (died 1957)
- 1872 – Frank Crowninshield, American journalist and art and theatre critic (died 1947)
- 1875 – Forrest Reid, Irish novelist, literary critic and translator (died 1947)
- 1880 – Oswald Veblen, American mathematician and academic (g. 1960)
- 1880 – João Cândido, Brazilian revolutionary and sailor (died 1969)
- 1881 – George Shiels, Irish-Canadian author, poet, and playwright (died 1949)
- 1882 – Athanase David, Canadian lawyer and politician (died 1953)
- 1882 – Carl Diem, German businessman (died 1962)
- 1883 – Victor Francis Hess, Austrian-American physicist and academic, Nobel Prize laureate (died 1964)
- 1883 – Fritz Löhner-Beda, Austrian librettist, lyricist and writer (died 1942)
- 1883 – Jean Metzinger, French artist (died 1956)
- 1883 – Arthur L. Newton, American runner (died 1956)
- 1883 – Frank Verner, American runner (died 1966)
- 1884 – Frank Waller, American runner (died 1941)
- 1885 – Olaf Holtedahl, Norwegian geologist (died 1975)
- 1888 – Gerrit Rietveld, Dutch architect, designed the Rietveld Schröder House (died 1964)
- 1893 – Roy O. Disney, American businessman, co-founded The Walt Disney Company (died 1971)
- 1895 – Jack Dempsey, American boxer and soldier (died 1983)
- 1898 – Armin Öpik, Estonian-Australian paleontologist and geologist (died 1983)
- 1898 – Karl Selter, Estonian politician, 14th Minister of Foreign Affairs of Estonia (died 1958)
- 1900 – Wilhelm Cauer, German mathematician and engineer (died 1945)

=== 1901–present ===
- 1901 – Marcel Mule, French saxophonist (died 2001)
- 1901 – Harry Partch, American composer and theorist (died 1974)
- 1901 – Chuck Taylor, American basketball player and salesman (died 1969)
- 1904 – Phil Harris, American singer-songwriter and actor (died 1995)
- 1904 – Olga Olgina, Polish opera singer and teacher (died 1979)
- 1905 – Fred Alderman, American sprinter (died 1998)
- 1906 – Pierre Fournier, French cellist and educator (died 1986)
- 1906 – Willard Maas, American poet and educator (died 1971)
- 1907 – Arseny Tarkovsky, Russian poet and translator (died 1989)
- 1908 – Hugo Distler, German organist, composer, and conductor (died 1942)
- 1908 – Alfons Rebane, Estonian colonel (died 1976)
- 1909 – Jean Deslauriers, Canadian violinist, composer, and conductor (died 1978)
- 1909 – William Penney, Baron Penney, English mathematician and physicist (died 1991)
- 1909 – Betty Cavanna, American author (died 2001)
- 1911 – Juan Manuel Fangio, Argentine race car driver (died 1995)
- 1911 – Ernesto Sabato, Argentine physicist and academic (died 2011)
- 1911 – Portia White, Canadian opera singer (died 1968)
- 1912 – Brian Johnston, English sportscaster and author (died 1994)
- 1912 – Mary Wesley, English author (died 2002)
- 1913 – Gustaaf Deloor, Belgian cyclist and soldier (died 2002)
- 1914 – Kari Diesen, Norwegian singer and revue actress (died 1987)
- 1914 – Jan Karski, Polish-American activist and academic (died 2000)
- 1914 – Pearl Witherington, French secret agent (died 2008)
- 1915 – Fred Hoyle, English astronomer and author (died 2001)
- 1915 – Norman Cousins, American editor (Saturday Review) and peace activist (died 1990)
- 1916 – William B. Saxbe, American soldier, lawyer, and politician, 70th United States Attorney General (died 2010)
- 1916 – Saloua Raouda Choucair, Lebanese painter and sculptor (died 2017)
- 1916 – John Ciardi, American poet, translator (Dante's "Divine Comedy"), and literary commentator (died 1986)
- 1917 – David Easton, Canadian-American political scientist and academic (died 2014)
- 1917 – Lucy Jarvis, American television producer (died 2020)
- 1917 – Ramblin' Tommy Scott, American singer and guitarist (died 2013)
- 1917 – Joan Clarke, English cryptanalyst and numismatist (died 1996)
- 1918 – Mildred Ladner Thompson, American journalist and author (died 2013)
- 1918 – Yong Nyuk Lin, Singaporean businessman and politician, Singaporean Minister for Education (died 2012)
- 1919 – Al Molinaro, American actor (died 2015)
- 1921 – Gerhard Sommer, German soldier (died 2019)
- 1922 – Jack Carter, American actor and comedian (died 2015)
- 1922 – John Postgate, English microbiologist, author, and academic (died 2014)
- 1922 – Richard Timberlake, American economist (died 2020)
- 1923 – Margaret Olley, Australian painter and philanthropist (died 2011)
- 1924 – Kurt Furgler, Swiss politician, 70th President of the Swiss Confederation (died 2008)
- 1924 – Archie Roy, Scottish astronomer and academic (died 2012)
- 1924 – Yoshito Takamine, American politician (died 2015)
- 1925 – Ogden Reid, American politician (died 2019)
- 1927 – Fernand Dumont, Canadian sociologist, philosopher, and poet (died 1997)
- 1927 – James B. Edwards, American dentist, soldier, and politician, 3rd United States Secretary of Energy (died 2014)
- 1927 – Martin Lewis Perl, American physicist and engineer, Nobel Prize laureate (died 2014)
- 1929 – Carolyn S. Shoemaker, American astronomer (died 2021)
- 1930 – Claude Chabrol, French actor, director, producer, and screenwriter (died 2010)
- 1930 – Donald Gordon, South African businessman and philanthropist (died 2019)
- 1930 – William Bernard Ziff, Jr., American publisher (died 2006)
- 1931 – Billy Casper, American golfer (died 2015)
- 1932 – David McTaggart, Canadian-Italian environmentalist (died 2001)
- 1933 – Bob Cole, Canadian sports announcer (died 2024)
- 1933 – Sam Jones, American basketball player and coach (died 2021)
- 1933 – Ngina Kenyatta, 1st First Lady of Kenya
- 1933 – Rosalie Sorrels, American traditional folk singer-songwriter (died 2017)
- 1934 – Ferdinand Biwersi, German footballer and referee (died 2013)
- 1934 – Jean-Pierre Ferland, Canadian singer-songwriter (died 2024)
- 1934 – Gloria Christian, Italian singer
- 1935 – Terry Riley, American composer and educator
- 1935 – Charlie Dees, American baseball player
- 1935 – Pete Hamill, Quintessential New York Journalist, (died 2020)
- 1935 – Jean Milesi, French racing cyclist
- 1936 – Robert Downey Sr., American actor and director (died 2021)
- 1937 – Anita Desai, Indian-American author and academic
- 1938 – Lawrence Block, American author
- 1938 – Abulfaz Elchibey, Azerbaijani politician, 1st democratically elected Azerbaijani President (died 2000)
- 1938 – Ken Gray, New Zealand rugby player (died 1992)
- 1939 – Brigitte Fontaine, French singer
- 1939 – Judy Olson Duhamel, American politician and educator
- 1940 – Ian Ross, Australian newsreader (died 2014)
- 1940 – Vittorio Storaro, Italian cinematographer
- 1941 – Erkin Koray, Turkish singer-songwriter and guitarist (died 2023)
- 1941 – Julia Kristeva, Bulgarian-French psychoanalyst and author
- 1941 – Graham McKenzie, Australian cricketer
- 1942 – Arthur Brown, English rock singer-songwriter
- 1942 – Michele Lee, American actress and singer
- 1942 – Eduardo Frei Ruiz-Tagle, Chilean engineer and politician, 32nd President of Chile
- 1942 – Colin Groves, Australian academician and educator (died 2017)
- 1943 – Birgit Grodal, Danish economist and academic (died 2004)
- 1944 – Jeff Beck, English guitarist and songwriter (died 2023)
- 1944 – Kathryn Lasky, American author
- 1944 – Chris Wood, English saxophonist (died 1983)
- 1945 – Colin Blunstone, English singer-songwriter
- 1945 – Wayne Cashman, Canadian ice hockey player and coach
- 1945 – George Pataki, American lawyer and politician, 53rd Governor of New York
- 1945 – Betty Stöve, Dutch tennis player
- 1946 – David Collenette, Canadian civil servant and politician, 32nd Canadian Minister of National Defence
- 1946 – Ellison Onizuka, American engineer, and astronaut (died 1986)
- 1946 – Robert Reich, American economist and politician, 22nd United States Secretary of Labor
- 1947 – Clarissa Dickson Wright, English chef, author, and television personality (died 2014)
- 1947 – Mick Fleetwood, English-American drummer
- 1947 – Peter Weller, American actor and director
- 1948 – Patrick Moraz, Swiss keyboard player and songwriter
- 1949 – John Illsley, English singer-songwriter, bass player, and producer
- 1949 – Betty Jackson, English fashion designer
- 1950 – Nancy Allen, American actress
- 1950 – Bob Carlos Clarke, Irish-born English photographer (died 2006)
- 1950 – Jan Kulczyk, Polish businessman (died 2015)
- 1950 – Mercedes Lackey, American author
- 1951 – Raelene Boyle, Australian sprinter
- 1951 – Charles Sturridge, English director, producer, and screenwriter
- 1952 – Dianna Melrose, English diplomat, British High Commissioner to Tanzania
- 1952 – Bob Neill, English lawyer and politician
- 1953 – William E. Moerner, American chemist and physicist, Nobel Prize laureate
- 1953 – Michael Tuck, Australian footballer and coach
- 1955 – Chris Higgins, English geneticist and academic
- 1955 – Edmund Malura, German footballer and manager
- 1955 – Loren Roberts, American golfer
- 1956 – Owen Paterson, English politician, Secretary of State for Northern Ireland
- 1957 – Mark Parkinson, American lawyer and politician, 45th Governor of Kansas
- 1958 – Jean Charest, Canadian lawyer and politician, 5th Deputy Prime Minister of Canada
- 1958 – Silvio Mondinelli, Italian mountaineer
- 1958 – Reed Oliver, governor of Pohnpei State, Micronesia
- 1958 – John Tortorella, American ice hockey player and coach
- 1959 – Andy McCluskey, English singer-songwriter, bass player, and producer
- 1960 – Elish Angiolini, Scottish lawyer, judge, and politician, Solicitor General for Scotland
- 1960 – Siedah Garrett, American singer-songwriter and pianist
- 1960 – Karin Pilsäter, Swedish accountant and politician
- 1960 – Erik Poppe, Norwegian director, cinematographer, and screenwriter
- 1961 – Dennis Danell, American singer and guitarist (died 2000)
- 1961 – Iain Glen, Scottish actor
- 1961 – Bernie Nicholls, Canadian ice hockey player and coach
- 1961 – Ralph E. Reed, Jr., American journalist and activist
- 1961 – Curt Smith, English singer-songwriter, guitarist, and producer
- 1962 – Gautam Adani, Indian industrialist and billionaire
- 1962 – Claudia Sheinbaum, Mexican politician
- 1963 – Yuri Kasparyan, Russian guitarist
- 1963 – Preki, Serbian-American soccer player and coach
- 1963 – Mike Wieringo, American author and illustrator (died 2007)
- 1964 – Jean-Luc Delarue, French television host and producer (died 2012)
- 1964 – Kathryn Parminter, Baroness Parminter, English politician
- 1964 – Gary Suter, American ice hockey player and scout
- 1965 – Claude Bourbonnais, Canadian race car driver
- 1965 – Uwe Krupp, German ice hockey player and coach
- 1965 – Richard Lumsden, English actor, writer, composer and musician
- 1965 – Danielle Spencer, American actress (died 2025)
- 1966 – Hope Sandoval, American singer-songwriter and musician
- 1966 – Adrienne Shelly, American actress, director, and screenwriter (died 2006)
- 1967 – Janez Lapajne, Slovenian director and producer
- 1967 – John Limniatis, Canadian soccer player and manager
- 1968 – Alaa Abdelnaby, Egyptian-American basketball player and sportscaster
- 1970 – Glenn Medeiros, American singer-songwriter and guitarist
- 1970 – Bernardo Sassetti, Portuguese pianist, composer, and educator (died 2012)
- 1972 – Robbie McEwen, Australian cyclist
- 1972 – Denis Žvegelj, Slovenian rower
- 1973 – Alexis Gauthier, French chef
- 1973 – Jere Lehtinen, Finnish ice hockey player
- 1974 – Dan Byles, English sailor, rower, and politician
- 1974 – Chris Guccione, American baseball player and umpire
- 1975 – Marek Malík, Czech ice hockey player
- 1975 – Federico Pucciariello, Argentine-Italian rugby player
- 1976 – Brock Olivo, American football player and coach
- 1977 – Dimos Dikoudis, Greek basketball player and manager
- 1977 – Jeff Farmer, Australian footballer
- 1977 – Amir Talai, American actor
- 1978 – Luis García, Spanish footballer
- 1978 – Pantelis Kafes, Greek footballer
- 1978 – Shunsuke Nakamura, Japanese footballer
- 1978 – Ariel Pink, American singer-songwriter
- 1978 – Juan Román Riquelme, Argentine footballer and chairman
- 1978 – Emppu Vuorinen, Finnish guitarist and songwriter
- 1979 – Mindy Kaling, American actress and producer
- 1979 – Petra Němcová, Czech model and philanthropist
- 1980 – Cicinho, Brazilian footballer
- 1980 – Nina Dübbers, German tennis player
- 1980 – Andrew Jones, Australian race car driver
- 1980 – Minka Kelly, American actress
- 1982 – Kevin Nolan, English footballer
- 1982 – Jarret Stoll, Canadian ice hockey player
- 1983 – Rebecca Cooke, English swimmer
- 1983 – John Lloyd Cruz, Filipino actor
- 1983 – Gianni Munari, Italian footballer
- 1983 – Gard Nilssen, Norwegian drummer
- 1983 – David Shillington, Australian rugby league player
- 1984 – Andrea Raggi, Italian footballer
- 1984 – JJ Redick, American basketball player and coach
- 1984 – Johanna Welin, Swedish-born German wheelchair basketball player
- 1985 – Diego Alves Carreira, Brazilian footballer
- 1985 – Tom Kennedy, English footballer
- 1985 – Nate Myles, Australian rugby league player
- 1985 – Vernon Philander, South African cricketer
- 1985 – Yukina Shirakawa, Japanese model
- 1986 – Stuart Broad, English cricketer
- 1986 – Phil Hughes, American baseball player
- 1986 – Solange Knowles, American singer-songwriter and actress
- 1987 – Simona Dobrá, Czech tennis player
- 1987 – Lionel Messi, Argentine footballer
- 1987 – Pierre Vaultier, French snowboarder
- 1988 – Micah Richards, English footballer
- 1988 – Nichkhun, Thai-American singer and actor
- 1989 – Teklemariam Medhin, Eritrean runner
- 1990 – Michael Del Zotto, Canadian ice hockey player
- 1990 – Richard Sukuta-Pasu, German footballer
- 1991 – Yasmin Paige, English actress
- 1991 – Aidan Sezer, Australian rugby league player
- 1992 – David Alaba, Austrian footballer
- 1996 – Duki, Argentine rapper
- 1998 – Federico Gatti, Italian footballer
- 1998 – Pierre-Luc Dubois, Canadian ice hockey player
- 1999 – Darwin Núñez, Uruguayan footballer
- 2000 – Nehuén Pérez, Argentine footballer
- 2008 – Mathis Jangéal, French footballer

== Deaths ==
=== Pre-1600 ===
- 1046 – Jeongjong II, Korean ruler (born 1018)
- 1088 – William de Warenne, 1st Earl of Surrey, Norman nobleman
- 1314 – Gilbert de Clare, 8th Earl of Gloucester, English commander (born 1291)
- 1314 – Robert de Clifford, 1st Baron de Clifford, English soldier and politician, Lord Warden of the Marches (born 1274)
- 1398 – Hongwu, Chinese emperor (born 1328)
- 1439 – Frederick IV, duke of Austria (born 1382)
- 1503 – Reginald Bray, English architect and politician, Chancellor of the Duchy of Lancaster (born 1440)
- 1519 – Lucrezia Borgia, Italian wife of Alfonso I d'Este, Duke of Ferrara (born 1480)
- 1520 – Hosokawa Sumimoto, Japanese commander (born 1489)

=== 1601–1900 ===
- 1604 – Edward de Vere, 17th Earl of Oxford, English courtier, Lord Great Chamberlain (born 1550)
- 1637 – Nicolas-Claude Fabri de Peiresc, French astronomer and historian (born 1580)
- 1643 – John Hampden, English politician (born 1595)
- 1766 – Adrien Maurice de Noailles, French soldier and politician, French Minister of Foreign Affairs (born 1678)
- 1778 – Pieter Burman the Younger, Dutch philologist and academic (born 1714)
- 1803 – Matthew Thornton, Irish-American judge and politician (born 1714)
- 1817 – Thomas McKean, American lawyer and politician, 2nd Governor of Pennsylvania (born 1734)
- 1835 – Andreas Vokos Miaoulis, Greek admiral and politician (born 1769)

=== 1901–present ===
- 1902 – George Leake, Australian politician, 2nd Premier of Western Australia (born 1856)
- 1908 – Grover Cleveland, American lawyer and politician, 22nd and 24th President of the United States (born 1837)
- 1909 – Sarah Orne Jewett, American novelist, short story writer, and poet (born 1849)
- 1922 – Walther Rathenau, German businessman and politician, 7th German Minister for Foreign Affairs (born 1867)
- 1923 – Edith Södergran, Swedish-Finnish poet (born 1892)
- 1931 – Otto Mears, Russian-American businessman (born 1840)
- 1931 – Xiang Zhongfa, Chinese politician, 2nd General Secretary of the Chinese Communist Party (born 1880)
- 1932 – Ernst Põdder, Estonian general (born 1879)
- 1935 – Carlos Gardel, French-Argentine singer, composer and actor (born 1890)
- 1943 – Camille Roy, Canadian priest and critic (born 1870)
- 1946 – Louise Whitfield Carnegie, American philanthropist (born 1857)
- 1947 – Emil Seidel, American politician, Mayor of Milwaukee (born 1864)
- 1962 – Volfgangs Dārziņš, Latvian composer, pianist and music critic (born 1906)
- 1964 – Stuart Davis, American painter and academic (born 1892)
- 1969 – Frank King, American cartoonist (born 1883)
- 1969 – Willy Ley, German-American historian and author (born 1906)
- 1975 – Wendell Ladner, Professional Basketball Player in the ABA
- 1976 – Minor White, American photographer, critic, and academic (born 1908)
- 1978 – Robert Charroux, French author and critic (born 1909)
- 1980 – V. V. Giri, Indian lawyer and politician, 4th President of India (born 1894)
- 1984 – Clarence Campbell, Canadian businessman (born 1905)
- 1987 – Jackie Gleason, American actor, comedian, and producer (born 1916)
- 1988 – Csaba Kesjár, Hungarian race car driver (born 1962)
- 1991 – Sumner Locke Elliott, Australian-American author and playwright (born 1917)
- 1991 – Rufino Tamayo, Mexican painter and illustrator (born 1899)
- 1994 – Jean Vallerand, Canadian violinist, composer, and conductor (born 1915)
- 1995 – Andrew J. Transue, American politician and attorney Morissette v. United States (born 1903)
- 1997 – Brian Keith, American actor (born 1921)
- 2000 – Vera Atkins, British intelligence officer (born 1908)
- 2000 – David Tomlinson, English actor and comedian (born 1917)
- 2000 – Rodrigo Bueno, Argentine cuarteto singer (born 1973)
- 2001 – Konstantin Gerchik, the second head of the world's first cosmodrome — "Baikonur" (1958–1961).
- 2002 – Pierre Werner, Luxembourgish banker and politician, 21st Prime Minister of Luxembourg (born 1913)
- 2004 – Ifigeneia Giannopoulou, Greek songwriter and author (born 1957)
- 2005 – Paul Winchell, American actor, voice artist, and ventriloquist (born 1922)
- 2007 – Natasja Saad, Danish rapper and reggae singer (born 1974)
- 2007 – Chris Benoit, Canadian wrestler (born 1967)
- 2007 – Derek Dougan, Northern Irish footballer and manager (born 1938)
- 2008 – Gerhard Ringel, Austrian mathematician and academic (born 1919)
- 2009 – Roméo LeBlanc, Canadian journalist and politician, 25th Governor General of Canada (born 1927)
- 2010 – Fred Anderson, American jazz tenor saxophonist (born 1929)
- 2011 – Tomislav Ivić, Croatian football coach and manager (born 1933)
- 2012 – Darrel Akerfelds, American baseball player and coach (born 1962)
- 2012 – Gad Beck, German author and educator (born 1923)
- 2012 – Gu Chaohao, Chinese mathematician and academic (born 1926)
- 2012 – Miki Roqué, Spanish footballer (born 1988)
- 2012 – Ann C. Scales, American lawyer, educator, and activist (born 1952)
- 2012 – Lonesome George, last known Pinta Island tortoise (hatched c. 1910)
- 2013 – Mick Aston, English archaeologist and academic (born 1946)
- 2013 – Emilio Colombo, Italian politician, 40th Prime Minister of Italy (born 1920)
- 2013 – Joannes Gijsen, Dutch bishop (born 1932)
- 2013 – William Hathaway, American lawyer and politician (born 1924)
- 2013 – James Martin, English-Bermudian computer scientist and author (born 1933)
- 2013 – Alan Myers, American drummer (born 1955)
- 2014 – John Clement, Canadian lawyer and politician (born 1928)
- 2014 – Marilyn Fisher Lundy, American businesswoman (born 1925)
- 2014 – Olga Kotelko, Canadian runner and softball player (born 1919)
- 2014 – Ramón José Velásquez, Venezuelan journalist, lawyer, and politician, President of Venezuela (born 1916)
- 2014 – Eli Wallach, American actor (born 1915)
- 2015 – Cristiano Araújo, Brazilian singer-songwriter (born 1986)
- 2015 – Mario Biaggi, American police officer, politician and criminal (born 1917)
- 2015 – Marva Collins, American author and educator (born 1936)
- 2015 – Susan Ahn Cuddy, American lieutenant (born 1915)
- 2021 – Benigno Aquino III, 15th President of the Philippines (born 1960)
- 2021 – Trần Thiện Khiêm, 7th Prime Minister of South Vietnam and army officer (born 1925)
- 2024 – Shifty Shellshock, American vocalist (born 1974)
- 2025 – Bobby Sherman, American singer-songwriter and actor (born 1943)

== Holidays and observances ==
- Army Day or Battle of Carabobo Day (Venezuela)
- Bannockburn Day (Scotland)
- Christian feast day:
  - Gohard
  - Joseph Yuan
  - María Guadalupe García Zavala
  - Nativity of Saint John the Baptist
  - Rumbold of Mechlin
  - June 24 (Eastern Orthodox liturgics)
- Day of the Caboclo (Amazonas, Brazil)
- Inti Raymi, a winter solstice festival and a New Year in the Andes of the Southern Hemisphere (Sacsayhuamán)
- St John's Day and the second day of the Midsummer celebrations (although this is not the astronomical summer solstice, see June 20) (Roman Catholic Church, Europe), and its related observances:
  - Enyovden (Bulgaria)
  - Catalan Countries National Day (Andorra, Balearic Islands, Catalonia, Northern Catalonia, Valencia)
  - Jaanipäev (Estonia)
  - Jāņi (Latvia)
  - Jónsmessa (Iceland)
  - Midsummer Day (England)
  - Saint Jonas' Festival or Joninės (Lithuania)
  - Saint-Jean-Baptiste Day (Quebec)
  - Sânziene (western Carpathian Mountains of Romania)
  - Wattah Wattah Festival (Philippines)
- Fors Fortuna, ancient Roman festival to Fortuna
