= Gaston van de Werve et de Schilde =

Belgian Roman Catholic politician

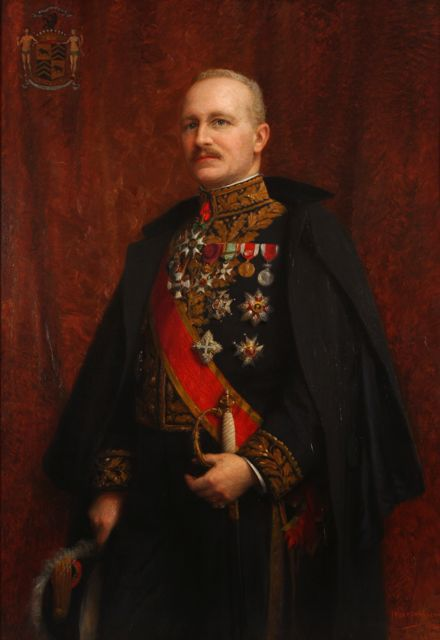
- Gaston van de Werve et de Schilde
- Born: Gaston van de Werve et de Schilde; 22 March 1867; Paris, France
- Died: 18 August 1923 (aged 56); Antwerp, Belgium
- Occupation: politician

Baron Gaston van de Werve et de Schilde (22 March 1867 – 18 August 1923) was a Belgian Roman Catholic politician. He was governor of the province of Antwerp from 16 December 1912 until his death on 18 August 1923 .

He was the son of baron Henri van de werve et de Schilde, and of Jeanne de Béthisy. He married Françoise de la Boëssière-Thiennes, daughter of the Marquess Gaston de la Boëssière-Thiennes, and of the countess Louise de Lannoy.

== Political career ==
Gaston van de Werve et de Schilde was a member of the Antwerp provincial council for the canton Zandhoven from 5 July 1893 until 16 December 1912.

== Honours ==
- Commander Legion of Honour.
- Knight grand cross in the Order of Saint Gregory the Great.
- Order of pope Pius X.

== Sources ==
- Steve Heylen, Bart De Nil, Bart D’hondt, Sophie Gyselinck, Hanne Van Herck en Donald Weber, Geschiedenis van de provincie Antwerpen. Een politieke biografie, Antwerpen, Provinciebestuur Antwerpen, 2005, Vol. 2 p. 199

Gaston van de Werve et de Schilde House of van de Werve Born: 22 March 1867 Died: 18 August 1923
Regnal titles
Preceded by Henri van de Werve	Baron of Schilde; 1775-1834	Succeeded by Adelin van de Werve

Preceded by Ferdinand de Baillet-Latour	Governor of Antwerp; 1912 – 1932	Succeeded by Georges Holvoet
