= Charles-Bernard van de Werve =

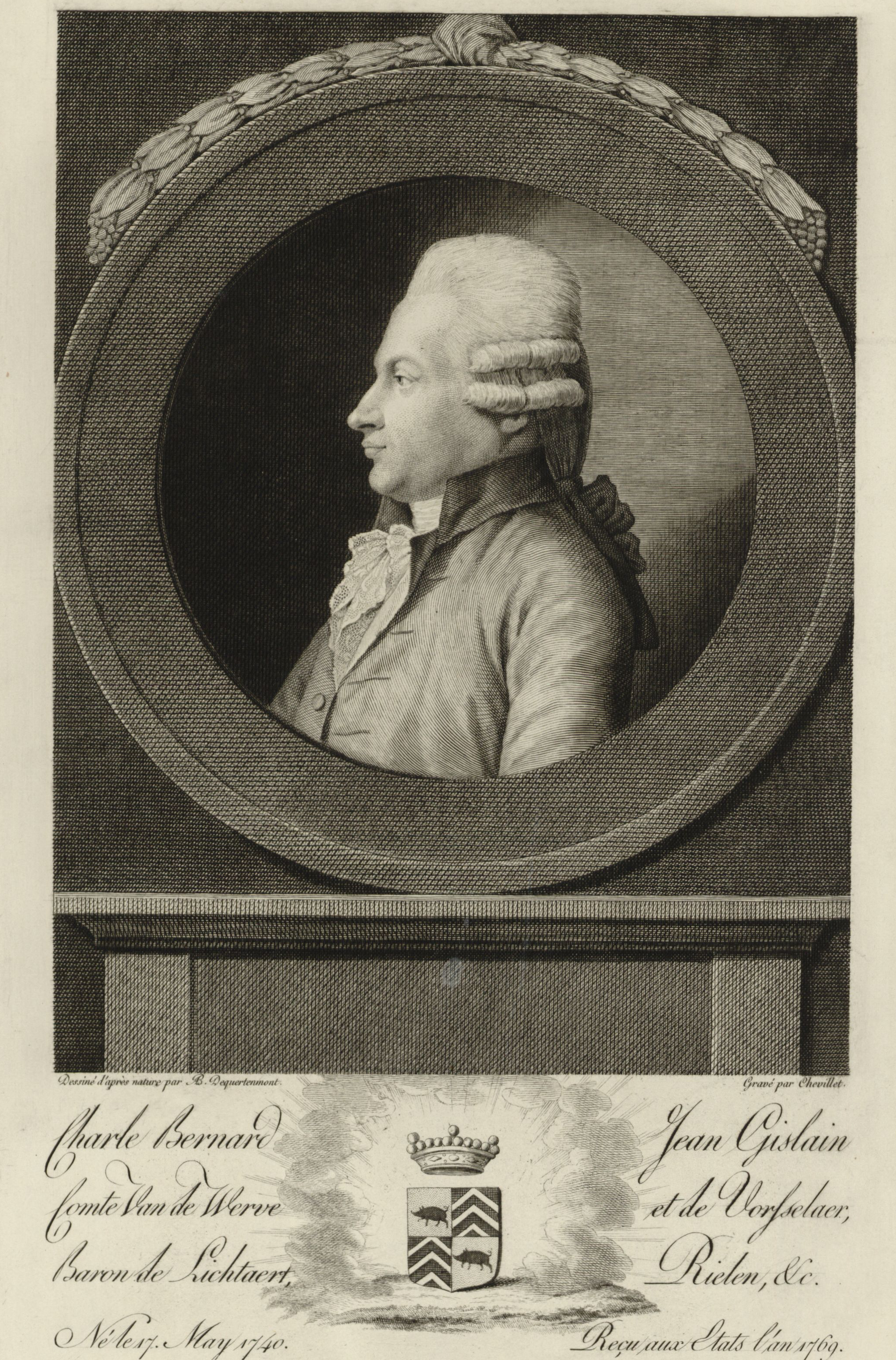

Charles Bernard Jean Ghislain van de Werve (1740–1813), 2nd Count of Vorsselaer, Baron of Lichtaert and of Rielen, Lord of Giessen-Oudkerk, formed part of a very old, important and noble family of Antwerp. He was the first of the van de Werve de Vorsselaer branch of the House of van de Werve.

== Family ==
He was the son of Charles-Philippe van de Werve, 1st Count of Vorsselaer and countess Marie-Anne née de Pret. In 1763 he married Hubertine de Gilman, daughter of the Lord of Mertsenhoven and Itteren by Catherine-Caroline Vecqemans de la Verre. In 1788 he married again with Reine della Faille, daughter of Jérôme della Faille.

One child was born from his first marriage, Augustin van de Werve, who was titled baron of Lichtaert as heir apparent of the count of Vorsselaer but died before his father so never became count of Vorsselaer. In 1784 Augustin married Marie-Anne van Colen.

Arms of the count of Vorselaar

Charles-Bernard van de Werve House of van de Werve Born: 17 May 1740 Died: 4 January 1813
Regnal titles
Preceded by Charles-Philippe	Count of Vorselaar; 1776–1813	Succeeded by Charles V Auguste
Preceded by Charles-Philippe	Baron of Lichtaert and of Rielen; 1768–1776	Vacant Title next held by Auguste II
