= Henri van de Werve et de Schilde =

Belgian nobleman

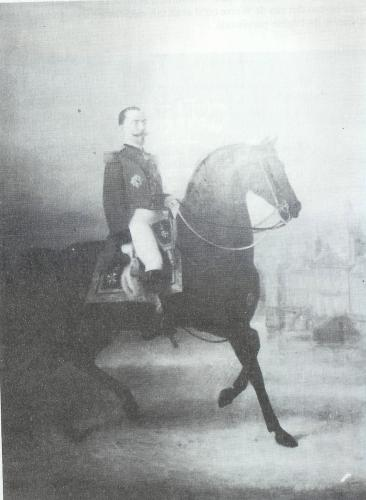

Armes of the baron of Schilde

Henri Marie Jacques Hyacinthe, Baron van de Werve et de Schilde (1 September 1844 – 26 June 1924) was a Belgian nobleman.

He was the only son of Baron Jacques and of Charlotte de Cossé-Brissac.

He married in Paris (1866) Jeanne de Béthisy. Jeanne was the daughter of the marquess of Béthisy and of Bernadine de l'Espinne. They had only one child:

- Baron Gaston van de Werve et de Schilde (1867–1923). He married Françoise de la Boëssière-Thiennes (daughter of the Maquess of la Boëssière-Thiennes and of countess Louise de Lannoy).

Henri and Jeanne divorced in 1877 and Jeanne married in 1878 the count of Louvencourt.

Henri van de Werve et de Schilde House of van de Werve Born: 1 September 1844 Died: 26 June 1924
Regnal titles
Preceded by Jacques van de Werve	Baron of Schilde; 1775-1834	Succeeded by Gaston van de Werve
