= María Guadalupe García Zavala =

Mexican Roman Catholic religious sister

Saint María Guadalupe García Zavala
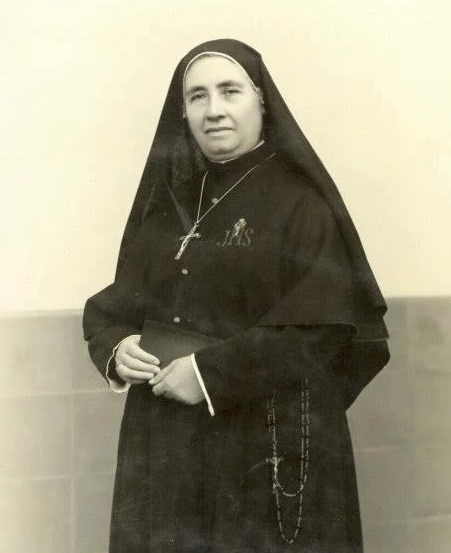
- Zavala in 1946

Religious
- Born: 27 April 1878; Zapopan, Jalisco, Mexico
- Died: 24 June 1963 (aged 85); Guadalajara, Jalisco, Mexico
- Venerated in: Roman Catholic Church
- Beatified: 25 April 2004, Saint Peter's Square, Vatican City by Pope John Paul II
- Canonized: 12 May 2013, Saint Peter's Square, Vatican City by Pope Francis
- Major shrine: Our Lady, Queen of Martyrs Parish Church, Carmona Cavite.
- Feast: 24 June
- Attributes: Religious habit
- Patronage: Nurses; Handmaids of Santa Margherita Maria and the Poor

María Guadalupe García Zavala (27 April 1878 – 24 June 1963) - born Anastasia Guadalupe García Zavala - was a Mexican Roman Catholic religious sister and the co-founder of the Handmaids of Santa Margherita and the Poor. She is also known as "Mother Lupita". At one time, she was engaged to be married but she decided her religious call was too strong for that and she broke off her engagement in order to pursue this call. She dedicated herself to the care of ill people and was noted for her compassion and faith.

Her beatification cause began in mid-1984 and her formal beatification was celebrated on 25 April 2004. Pope Francis later canonized her as a saint on 12 May 2013 in Saint Peter's Square.

Her feast day is April 27; she is a patron saint of nurses and the Handmaids of Santa Margherita Maria and the Poor.

== Life ==
Anastasia Guadalupe García Zavala was born in 1878 in Zapopan to Fortino García and Refugio Zavala de García; her father was a religious store merchant and his shop was located in front of the basilica to which she made frequent visits. Her baptism was celebrated in the parish of Saint Peter the Apostle. Those who knew her best as a child saw her as nice and likeable as well as an altruistic person who was willing to lend a hand to those who needed help the most. Her First Communion was on 8 September 1887 at the Zapopan basilica.

Zavala had planned to wed Gustavo Arreola (marriage was a strong desire for her) but she broke off their engagement in 1901 because she felt a call to the religious life and believed that she was called to give assistance to the poor and the sick. Zavala and her spiritual director (and future Servant of God) Cipriano Iñiguez Martín del Campo both co-founded a new religious order on 13 October 1901 titled as the Handmaids of Santa Margherita Maria and the Poor. Zavala described her call to the religious life as a "sudden change of heart" that she knew she had to follow. Zavala worked as a nurse and regardless of the poorness and the lack of material goods of the patients she was compassionate and caring towards the needs of the ill. Zavala was named as the Superior General for the new order.

In times of dire need she asked her spiritual director for permission to go begging in the streets in order to collect funds needed for the hospital. Zavala did this with her fellow religious and she would seek offerings until the needs of the hospital and patients were met and would ask for no more than was needed. The Mexican Revolution started in 1911 and its effects lasted up until 1936 during which the political-religious situation in Mexico became tense in which the faith underwent severe persecution. Zavala put her own life at risk and hid the priests and the Archbishop of Guadalajara in her hospital. It was the archdiocese who granted diocesan approval to the order on 24 May 1935.

Zavala began to suffer from a severe illness since 1961 and she died from this on 24 June 1963 in Guadalajara.

Her order now operates in nations such as Greece, Italy, Iceland and Peru. In 2005 there were 147 religious in 24 houses though this declined in 2015 with 112 women in 22 houses.

== Sainthood ==
The beatification process began in a diocesan process that opened in the Guadalajara archdiocese from 29 June 1984 until its closure on 11 June 1986; the Congregation for the Causes of Saints validated the cause on 15 March 1991 in Rome while receiving the Positio from postulation officials in 1992. The theological experts first approved the cause on 7 January 2000 while the C.C.S. did so as well on 21 March 2000 while the confirmation of her heroic virtue led Pope John Paul II to name her as Venerable on 1 July 2000.

The miracle for her beatification - a healing science could not explain - was investigated on a diocesan level and received C.C.S. validation on 11 January 2002 while a panel of medical experts on 13 March 2003; theologians likewise approved this on 17 June 2003 as did the C.C.S. on 11 November 2003. John Paul II approved this miracle on 20 December 2003 and beatified her in Saint Peter's Square on 25 April 2004.

The second miracle was investigated and it received C.C.S. validation on 14 May 2010 prior to the approval of a medical board on 15 December 2011; theologians voiced their assent to this on 26 May 2012 as did the C.C.S. on 2 October 2012. Pope Benedict XVI approved this miracle on 20 December 2012 and formalized the date at a consistory of cardinals on 11 February 2013 (just prior to announcing his resignation). Pope Francis canonized Zavala as a saint on 12 May 2013.

The postulator at the time of the canonization was Mgr. Oscar Sánchez Barba.
