= Karel Filips van de Werve =

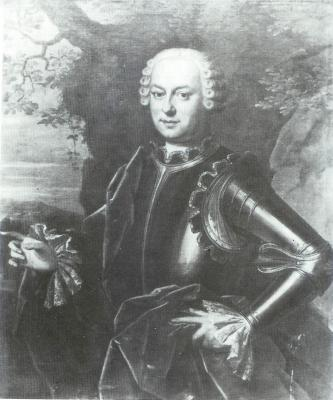

Charles Philippe Henri Jean Baptiste van de Werve (1706–1776), 1st count of Vorselaar, formed part of a very old, important and noble family of Antwerp.

== Family ==
Armes of the count of Vorselaar

He was the son of Baron Charles II Henri van de Werve, Lord of Schilde, Lord of Giessen-Oudkerk, Lord of Wavre-Notre-Dame and Lord of Wavrans; and his wife Eléonore-Louise de Varick.

He was married to Marie-Anne de Pret, lady of Vorselaar, Rielen and Lichtaert. Her father Philippe Louis was Mayor of Antwerp, her mother descended of the House of Moretus. Charles III became the first count of Vorsselaer, Baron of Lichtaert and of Rielen.

Philippe Louis de Pret, James de Pret de Calesberghe and Mechtilde van Hoorenbeeck, Anna Maria Moretus, Maria Anne de Pret and Charles III Philippe van de Werve, Joanna Maria Roose de Baisy, Philippe Antoine de Pret de Terveken are buried together in Saint-James in Antwerp.

== Career ==
He was in military service of the Empress Maria Therese, and became in 1768 by imperial decree 1st Count of Vorsselaer, a lordship he had inherited from his father-in-law. The next year he entered the Nobility of Brabant.

He was succeeded as Count of Vorsselaer by his eldest son Charles IV Bernard.

== Descendants ==
- Marie-Joseph van de Werve (1737–1737)
- Albert-Marie van de Werve (1738–1738)
- Anne-Marie-Caroline van de Werve (1739–1739)
- Charles IV Bernard van de Werve, 2nd Count of Vorsselaer (1740–1813): married in 1763 to Hubertine de Gilman and in 1788 Reine della Faille.
- Marie-Anne van de Werve (1742–1798), she married in 1763 Jean Roose, count of Baisy, baron of Boechout, Lord of Loupoigne
- Jean-Joseph van de Werve (1744–1744)
- Jeanne-Caroline van de Werve (1745–1747)
- Albertine van de Werve (1747–1810), she married in 1768 Jean-François, count de Hénin-Liétard and of Alsace, marquess of Alsace, baron of Fosseux, Lord of Dion le Val.
- Philippe I Louis van de Werve, 1st Baron of Schilde (1748–1834): married in 1767 Marie-Alexandrine de Fraule, in 1770 Thérèse Peeters and in 1791 Marie-Louise della Faille.
- Théodore Laurent van de Werve (1752–1780), he married in 1776 Anne Henriette de Neuf, Dame of Aissche
- Joseph-Henri van de Werve (1753–1753)
- Jeanne-Joséphine van de Werve (1755–1785), she married in 1777 François, baron van Ertborn.

Karel Filips van de Werve House of van de Werve Born: 2 November 1706 Died: 30 November 1776
Regnal titles
Preceded by -	1st Count of Vorsselaer; 1768-1776	Succeeded by Charles IV Bernard
Preceded by -	baron of Lichtaert and of Rielen; 1767-1768	Vacant Title next held by Charles IV Bernard
