= Nordiska Roddföreningen i Zürich =

Rowing club based in Switzerland

Nordiska Roddföreningen i Zürich, also known as Nordiska or NRF, is an amateur rowing club. Its club house is located on Mythenquai on the northwestern shore of Lake Zürich in Zürich, Switzerland. Nordiska's approximately 500 members are citizens of one of the Nordic countries (Denmark, Finland, Iceland, Norway, and Sweden), or speak a Scandinavian language. The club focuses on sports — especially rowing — as well as social and festive gatherings for the many Nordic people living in Switzerland.

== History ==
Nordiska was founded on the evening of Friday 22 February 1878, when seventeen ETH students of Nordic extraction held the inaugural meeting at Café Phönix near the university. The first Nordiska members were active rowers in other rowing clubs in Zürich, including Seeclub Zürich and Polytechniker Ruderclub.

N.R.F was the only Nordic association of its kind to survive the dissolution of the Union between Sweden and Norway in 1905.

== Members ==
Originally, the membership consisted exclusively of exchange students from the Nordic countries who were studying at ETH. Over time, the membership expanded to include students at the University of Zurich. In recent decades, the member roster has also included many working professionals from the Nordic region who relocated (temporarily or permanently) to Switzerland. Today members also include Swiss nationals and citizens of other nations who are fluent in one of the Scandinavian languages, or have some other connection to the Nordic region.

== Notable members ==
Nordiska's most well-known member was probably Sigfrid Edström. Edström was a member during two periods: first from 1891 until 1893 during his engineering studies at ETH; and later from 1897 until 1900 when he led the project to electrify the tram network of the City of Zurich. Edström was instrumental in founding the NRF Veterans (NRFV) on 22 February 1907. He served as the first NRFV president and led the effort to fund the construction in 1918 of the rowing club's current boathouse at Mythenquai 79.
