= Sweden–America Foundation =

Swedish foundation

The Sweden–America Foundation (Swedish: Sverige-Amerikastiftelsen) is a Swedish foundation which provides fellowships to younger Swedes for scientific and cultural work in the United States and Canada. The objectives for the Foundation are to "work for the development of a relationship between Sweden, on the one hand, and the United States and Canada, on the other, by promoting the exchange of scientific, cultural, and practical experiences through presenting fellowships to young men and women for research and graduate level studies in the United States and Canada."

== History ==
The Foundation was established in June 1919 by initiative of a number of scientists, businessmen, politicians and other prominent Swedes at the time. The Foundation is under the patronage of the King of Sweden, Carl XVI Gustaf.

The founders and first Board members included the Nobel laureates and Professors of Chemistry Svante Arrhenius and The Svedberg, the Swedish Arch Bishop and Professor of Theology Nathan Söderblom, the Managing Director of ASEA, J. Sigfrid Edström, the industrialist and banker Jacob Wallenberg, the chairman of the Social Democratic Party Hjalmar Branting, the author and Nobel laureate Selma Lagerlöf, and the artist Anders Zorn. The Foundation administers thirteen permanent scholarship funds of which twelve are used for the Fellowship Program. The first fund was established in 1919, when the Swedish artist Anders Zorn gave a generous donation to the Foundation. This became the ”Zorn Fellowship”, still considered one of the Sweden–America Foundation’s most prestigious awards.

Prince Bertil was honorary chairman of the Sweden–America Foundation from 1950 until his death in 1997. The Prince succeeded Crown Prince Gustaf Adolf who had been honorary chairman from 1919, when the Foundation was established. In honor of Prince Bertil’s 70th birthday, ”Prince Bertil’s Fellowship” was established. Since the death of Prince Bertil, his wife Princess Lilian participates in the Foundation’s annual meetings and presents this award to the recipient. The current honorary chairman of the Sweden–America Foundation is Crown Princess Victoria who has personal experience of higher education from her studies at Yale University. Crown Princess Victoria presents the awards at the award ceremony at Sweden–America Foundation’s annual meeting.

== Members ==
The following were members:

- Svante Arrhenius
- The Svedberg
- Nathan Söderblom
- J. Sigfrid Edström
- Jacob Wallenberg
- Hjalmar Branting
- Selma Lagerlöf
- Anders Zorn.
