= Fernand van de Werve =

Fernand, Count van de Werve, (9 June 1876 – 29 December 1958) was a Belgian nobleman.

== Family ==
He was the son of Léon van de Werve (1851-1920) and Irène Kervyn d'Oud Mooreghem (1857-1938). His uncle was René-Philippe van de Werve. He was married to Countess Blanche de Lichtervelde, daughter of Count Gaston-Auguste of Lichtervelde and Baronness Marguerite Fallon.

Children:

- Antoinette van de Werve de Vorsselaer b. 16.12.1911
- Denise van de Werve de Vorsselaer b. 30.01.1913
  - Married: Maxime van de Werve de Schilde
- Jacques van de Werve de Vorsselaer b. 01.10.1915
  - Married: Béatrice de Faestraets
- Léon van de Werve de Vorsselaer b. 14.10.1919

Fernand van de Werve House of van de Werve Born: 9 June 1876 Died: 29 December 1958
Regnal titles
Preceded by Léon-Philippe van de Werve	count van de Werve and of Vorselaar; 1920-1958	Succeeded by Jacques van de Werve de Vorsselaer
