= Ferdinand de Baillet-Latour =

Belgian politician

Ferdinand, Count de Baillet-Latour
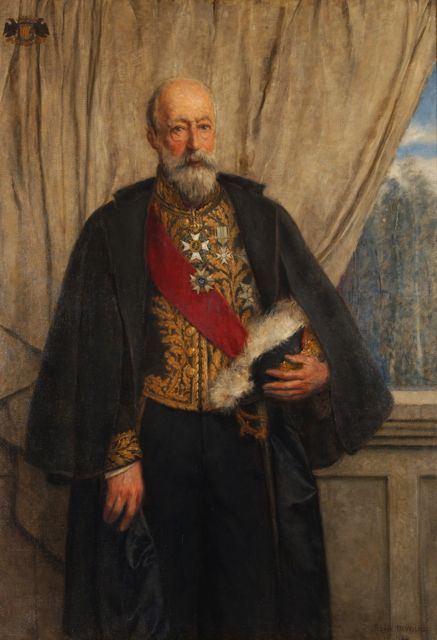
- Born: Ferdinand Charles Louis Antoine de Baillet–Latour; 21 January 1850; Brussels, Belgium
- Died: 18 September 1925 (aged 75); Brussels, Belgium
- Occupation: Politician

Ferdinand Charles Louis Antoine, Count of Baillet-Latour (21 January 1850 – 18 September 1925) was a Belgian politician. He was governor of the province of Antwerp from 14 March 1908 until 31 December 1912.

== Family ==
Baillet-Latour was born in the Belgian branch of the family and was the son of Alfred, Count de Baillet-Latour (1823–1889). He had two sons: Henri de Baillet-Latour and Louis, Count de Baillet-Latour (1878–1953).

== Political career ==
Ferdinand de Baillet-Latour was a member of the Antwerp provincial council for the canton Ekeren from 1 July 1902 until 14 March 1908. He was a member of the village council of Brasschaat from 1902 until 1908 and from 1913 until 1824. He was burgomaster of Brasschaat from 1902 until 1908, where he succeeded Armand Reussens, and (provincial) senator in the Belgian Senate from 1912 until 1921.

== Sources ==
- Steve Heylen, Bart De Nil, Bart D’hondt, Sophie Gyselinck, Hanne Van Herck en Donald Weber, Geschiedenis van de provincie Antwerpen. Een politieke biografie, Antwerpen, Provinciebestuur Antwerpen, 2005, Vol. 2 p. 41

Preceded by Louis de Brouchoven de Bergeyck	Governor of Antwerp; 1908–1912	Succeeded by Gaston van de Werve et de Schilde
