= Jacques van de Werve, 2nd Baron of Schilde =

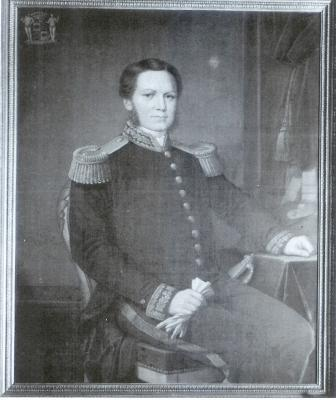

Armes of the baron of Schilde

Jacques Joseph Marie François de Paul van de Werve, Baron of Schilde (1793–1845) was a member of a noble family of Antwerp.

== Family ==
He is the son of Philippe-Louis, 1st Baron of Schilde and of Marie-Louise della Faille. He married in 1843 to Charlotte de Cossé-Brissac, daughter of count Désiré-Thimoléon of Cossé-Brissac (son of the duke of Brissac); and of Anne-Charlotte de Montmorency-Tancarville, Princess of Robech (daughter of the Prince of Montmorency and of Tancarville).

They had only one son:

- Baron Henri van de Werve et de Schilde (1844–1924), he married Jeanne de Béthisy.

Jacques van de Werve, 2nd Baron of Schilde House of van de Werve Born: 23 March 1793 Died: 8 November 1845
Regnal titles
Preceded by Philippe-Louis van de Werve	Baron of Schilde; 1834-1845	Succeeded by Henri van de Werve
