= Borrekens Castle =

Castle in Belgium

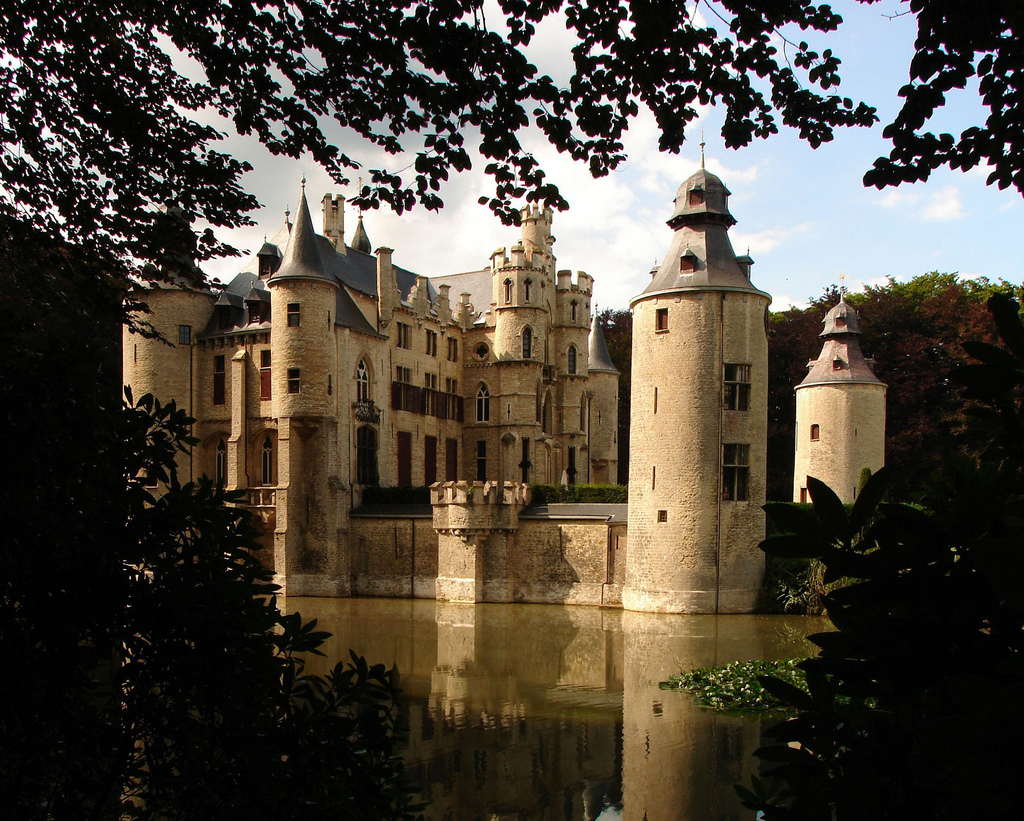
- Interactive map of the Borrekens Castle area

General information
- Location: Vorselaar, Antwerp, Belgium
- Coordinates: 51.2132°N 4.7775°E
- Elevation: 18 metres (59 ft)
- Construction started: 1270

Borrekens Castle, known also as Vorselaar Castle or Kasteel de Borrekens, is a castle within the municipality of Vorselaar, in the Belgian province of Antwerp.

The first feudal castle was built at the end of the 13th century by a member of the Van Rotselaar family. It is surrounded by a moat, and guarded by fortified towers at the entrance, to make it difficult for the attackers, surrounded the stronghold.

== House of Borrekens ==
The family still lives today, and comes from an old important line of nobles: the noble house of Borrekens descents from Laurent de Borrekens, grand Almoner of Brussels, married to Magdalen de Vielleuze. His grandson Englebert de Borrekens was Grans Almoner of Antwerp. Their descendants were incorporated in the Holy empire and knighted.

The castle came into the hands of Baron Edouard Adrien de Borrekens, of the De Borrekens family, through his marriage to Marie-Eulalie van de Werve in 1911. He had a French garden laid out in the courtyard by John Juchem. The last inhabitant of the castle was baron Raymond de Borrekens, who died in 1998. It was subsequently leased out by a family company.
