= Philippe-Louis van de Werve =

Nobleman of Antwerp

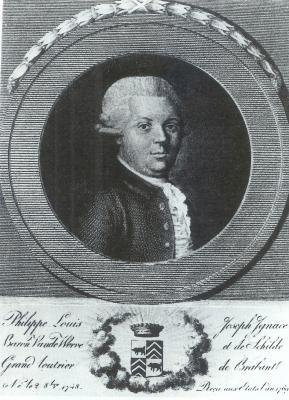

Philippe Louis Joseph Ignace van de Werve, 1st Baron of Schilde (1748–1834) formed part of a very old, important and noble family of Antwerp.

== Family ==
He is one of the 12 children of Charles-Philippe van de Werve, 1st Count of Vorsselaer and Marie-Anne de Pret.

He married 3 times:

Armes of the baron of Schilde

- Marie-Alexandrine de Fraule, daughter of Thomas, viscount of Fraula; and of Anne-Louise van Colen.
- Thérèse Peeters, daughter of Jean, Lord of Aertselar, Lord of Cleydael and Lord of Buerstede; and of Françoise van den Cruyce. The family Peeters was colossalement rich.
- Marie-Louise della Faille, daughter of Jacque-Abilius della Faille and of Claire della Faille.

He had 2 children with Marie-Louise della Faille:

- Jacques van de Werve, 2nd Baron of Schilde (1793–1845). He married Charlotte de Cossé-Brissac.
- Marie-Josephe van de Werve (1795–1811)

== Career ==
In 1768 he became by imperial decree 1st Baron of Schilde. Van de Werve was a freemason and member of La Concorde Universelle Lodge in Antwerp.

Philippe-Louis van de Werve House of van de Werve Born: 2 November 1748 Died: 30 November 1834
Regnal titles
Preceded by Jeanne de Pret	Baron of Schilde; 1764–1834	Succeeded by Jacques van de Werve
