= VBC Zandhoven =

Belgian women's volleyball club

Volleybalclub Zandhoven
- Short name: VBC Zandhoven
- Founded: 1982
- Ground: Sporthal Het Veld; Zandhoven; Belgium
- Chairman: (Belgium) Luc Van Rentergem
- Website: Club home page

Volleybalclub Zandhoven is a Belgian women's volleyball club based in Zandhoven.

The women's A squad played in Honour Division between 2007 and 2011. Their first season was surprisingly quite successful, with a place in the sub top as a result. However, due to the financially stronger top clubs, and under the influence of the Flemish volleyball school in Vilvoorde, Zandhoven saw quite some players leave to Asterix Kieldrecht and VDK Gent. The loss of quality also showed last season, when a final 8th place was reached.

VBC Zandhoven were obliged to relegate from Honour Division at the end of the 2010-11 season after the national volleyball association saw Zandhoven's sport hall unfit for further top volleyball, as no improvements were planned in the near future. Zandhoven decided to continue with their B team in Second Division, the fourth level.

After becoming champion in Second Division (season 2013-2014), Zandhoven started in First Division last year and reached a final 5th place. The team's home games are played in the town's new sport hall 'Het Veld', which opened in mid-2013.

== 2014-15 1st Division squad ==
Coach: (Belgium) Tom De Winne

| # | Nat. | Name |
|---|---|---|
| 1 | (Belgium) | Naomi Verstappen |
| 2 | (Belgium) | Robyn Theuns |
| 3 | (Belgium) | Lieselot Verhaert |
| 4 | (Belgium) | Lies Hufkens |
| 5 | (Belgium) | Lien De Busser |
| 6 | (Belgium) | Antje Verellen |
| 7 | (Belgium) | Margot Declercq |
| 8 | (Belgium) | Greet Coppé |
| 9 | (Belgium) | Marie Stoelen |
| 10 | (Belgium) | Jana Janssens |
| 11 | (Belgium) | Janne Verhaegen |
| 12 | (Belgium) | Evelyn Hellinck |
| 13 | (Belgium) | Jolien Jacobien |
| 14 | (Belgium) | Leen Van Grinsven |
