= Henri de Baillet-Latour =

President of the IOC from 1925 to 1942

His Excellency Count Henri de Baillet-Latour
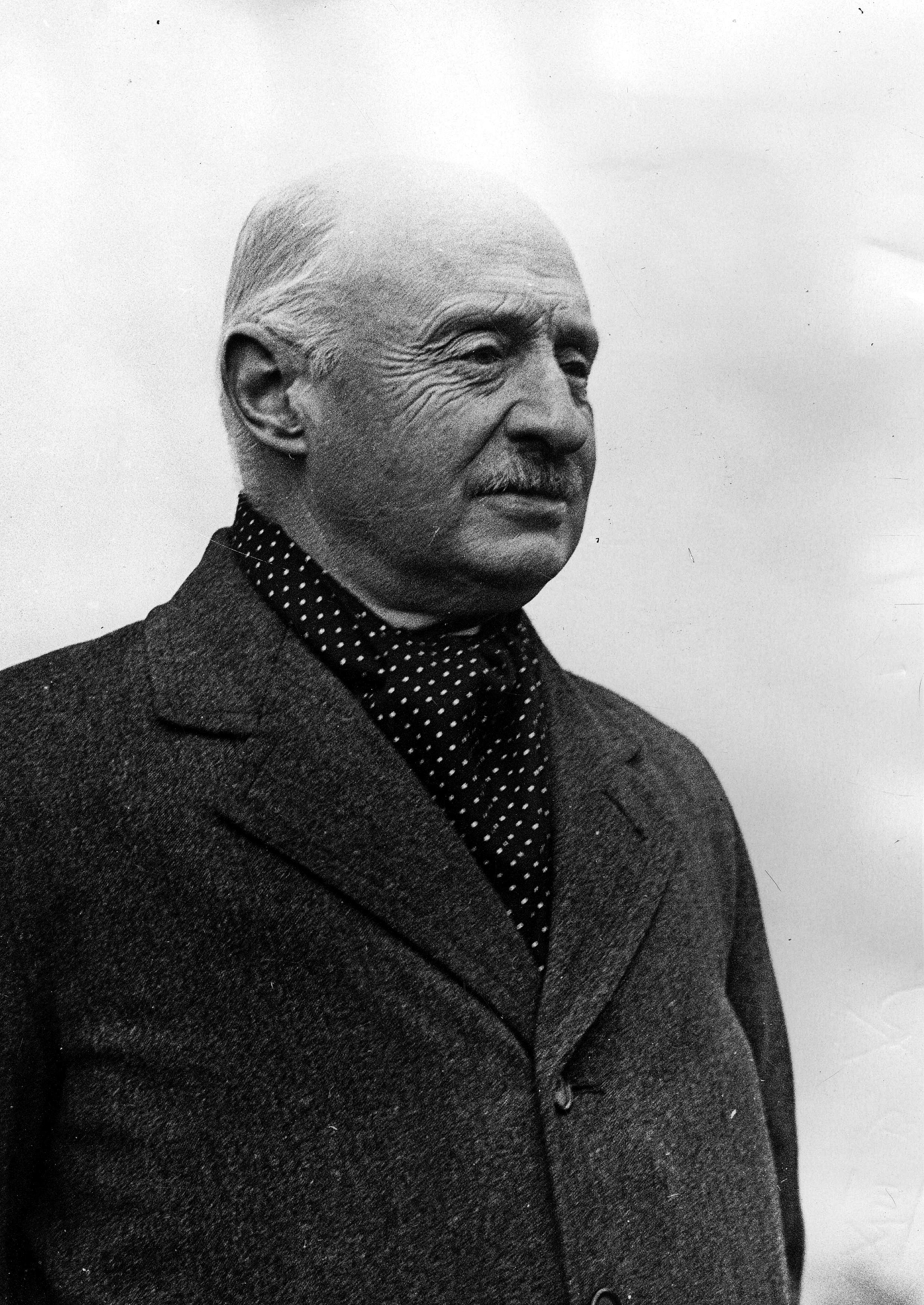
- De Baillet-Latour by the mid-1930s

3rd President of the International Olympic Committee
- In office 28 May 1925 – 6 January 1942
- Preceded by: Pierre de Coubertin
- Succeeded by: J. Sigfrid Edström

Personal details
- Born: 1 March 1876 Brussels, Belgium
- Died: 6 January 1942 (aged 65) Brussels, Belgium
- Spouse: Elisabeth Alexandrine von Clary und Aldringen (m. 1904)
- Children: 2
- Parent: Ferdinand de Baillet-Latour (father)

Henri de Baillet-Latour, Count of Baillet-Latour (1 March 1876 – 6 January 1942) was a Belgian aristocrat and the third president of the International Olympic Committee (IOC).

== Early life ==
Henri de Baillet-Latour was born in Brussels, Belgium, on 1 March 1876. He was the oldest of three children. His father was Count Ferdinand de Baillet-Latour, former governor of the Province of Antwerp, and his mother was Countess Caroline d'Oultremont de Duras.

He studied law at the University of Louvain, Belgium, between 1895 and 1897. His marriage to Countess Elisabeth Alexandrine Maria Sophie Felicie von Clary und Aldringen (Munich, 14 December 1885 – Brussels, 3 August 1955) took place in Brussels on 14 July 1904. Their son Guy Siegfried Ferdinand was born in May 1905, and their daughter Sophie Thérèse Ghislain Marie was born in February 1908.

== Career ==
=== Belgian Olympic Committee ===
De Baillet-Latour was elected as a member of the IOC in 1903. He was tasked with the organisation of sport in Belgium, and he co-founded the Belgian Olympic Committee in 1906. He was responsible for coordinating Belgium's participation at the London Olympics in 1908 and the Stockholm Olympics in 1912.

He was instrumental in securing the 1920 Summer Olympics for the Belgian city of Antwerp, and with only one year to prepare for the Games, he took on the responsibility of organizing the huge event amidst the devastation in Belgium following the First World War. The 1920 Games turned out to be a huge success despite the short notice, gaining him a great deal of respect among his IOC colleagues.

=== International Olympic Committee ===
When Pierre de Coubertin, the founder of the modern Olympic Movement, retired from the presidency in 1925 and becoming Honorary President, Henri de Baillet-Latour was elected as his successor. After the 1928 Summer Olympics, he tried – but failed – to ban women from all sports in the Olympics.

He was re-elected for a second term as IOC President in June 1933 and held the office for 17 years until his death in 1942. As IOC President, he focused on preserving the traditional ideals and integrity of the Olympics, and supporting amateur sport globally during a time of increasing political and commercial pressures, despite his antipathy towards Jews, and his desire to exclude women from participating in the Olympics. He was determined and diplomatic.

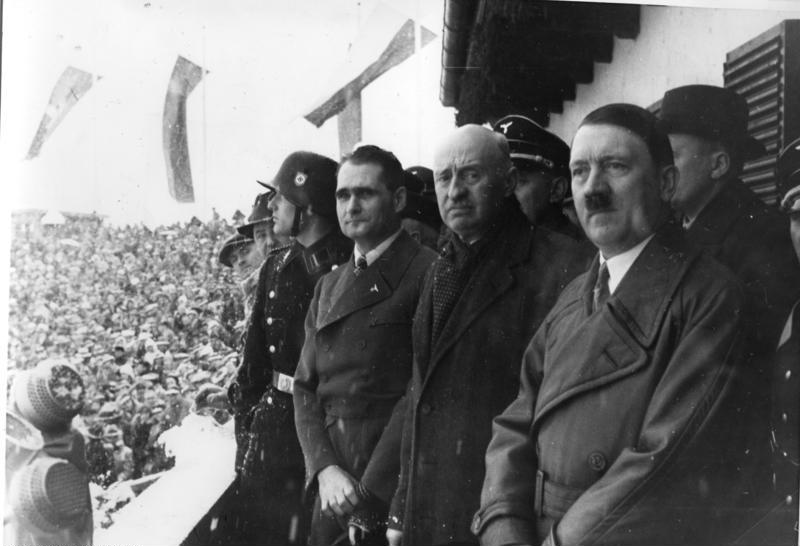
Count de Baillet-Latour, standing between Adolf Hitler (right) and Rudolf Hess, at the 1936 Winter Olympics opening ceremony

Henri de Baillet-Latour wrote to Avery Brundage in 1933: "I am not personally fond of jews [sic] and of the jewish [sic] influence, but I will not have them molested in no way [sic] whatsoever." Baillet-Latour opposed boycotting the 1936 Berlin Olympic Games.

After the 1936 Summer Olympics, he became an honorary member of Freude und Arbeit, the Nazi sports organization led by German propaganda minister Joseph Goebbels. In 1938, his wife congratulated Hitler when he annexed the Sudetenland.

In June 1939, the IOC voted unanimously in favour of Germany organising the 1940 Winter Games, replacing Japan that had returned the right to organise the 1940 Games. De Baillet-Latour argued that the decision in favour of Nazi Germany, which had occupied the Czech rump state three months before, showed the IOC's independence of political influences.

In 1940, when Germany invaded Belgium, his wife thanked Hitler "for bringing Nazi ideology to Belgium".

== Death ==
He died of a heart attack on 6 January 1942 in Brussels. His funeral was attended by leading Nazis, and German soldiers stood guard over his coffin, on which lay a wreath with a swastika which had been sent by Adolf Hitler.

Four months before his death, his only son had died, aged 36, in a plane crash on the Isle of Arran, Scotland, while on active service with the Free Belgian forces.

Henri de Baillet-Latour was succeeded as IOC president by his vice-president J. Sigfrid Edström.

== See also ==
- House of Baillet

Civic offices
Preceded by (France) Pierre de Coubertin (Switzerland) Godefroy de Blonay (acting)	President of the International Olympic Committee; 1925–1942	Succeeded by (Sweden) J. Sigfrid Edström
Preceded by (Sweden) J. Sigfrid Edström	President of Organizing Committee for Summer Olympic Games; 1920	Succeeded by (France) Pierre de Coubertin
