= Jacques van de Werve de Vorsselaer =

Belgian Nobleman

Jacques van de Werve de Vorsselaer (born 1 October 1915) is a Belgian nobleman of the Houses of Werve and Vorsselaer.

== Family ==
He is the son of Fernand and Blanche Marie Julie de Lichtervelde.

He married Béatrice de Faestraets (1925-2002) on 30 September 1947, and their children are:

- Marie-Antoinette van de Werve de Vorsselaer (b. 3 August 1948)
  - Married: Etienne Cornet d' Elzius de Peissant
- Isabelle van de Werve de Vorsselaer (b. 22 August 1949)
- Léon van de Werve de Vorsselaer
  - Married: Anne Gonze
- Nathalie van de Werve de Vorsselaer (b. 20 April 1954)
  - Married: Paul Moens de Hase
- Yolande van de Werve de Vorsselaer (b. 13 June 1956)
  - Married: Benoît Speeckaert
