= J. Sigfrid Edström =

President of the IOC from 1942 to 1952

His Excellency J. Sigfrid Edström
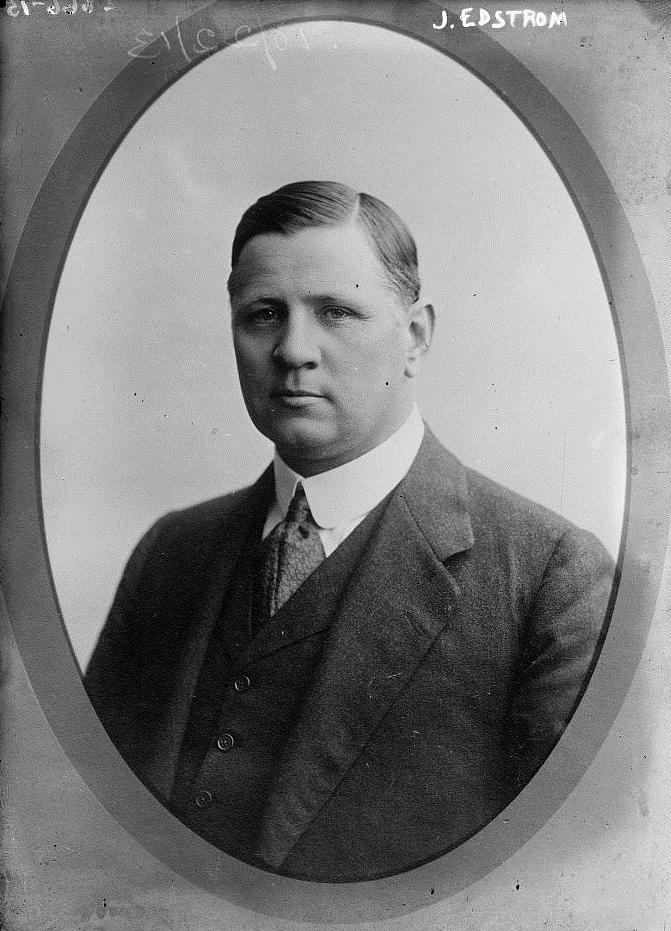
- Edström in the early 1910s

4th President of the International Olympic Committee
- In office 6 January 1942 – 6 September 1946 (acting)
- In office 6 September 1946 – 15 August 1952
- Preceded by: Henri de Baillet-Latour
- Succeeded by: Avery Brundage

Honorary President of the International Olympic Committee
- In office 15 August 1952 – 18 March 1964
- Preceded by: Vacant, last held by Pierre de Coubertin (1937)
- Succeeded by: Vacant, next held by Avery Brundage (1972)

Personal details
- Born: 11 November 1870 Morlanda, Sweden–Norway
- Died: 18 March 1964 (aged 93) Stockholm, Sweden
- Spouse: Ruth Randall (m. 1899; died 1944)
- Children: 4

Johannes Sigfrid Edström (11 November 1870 – 18 March 1964) was a Swedish industrialist, chairman of the Sweden-America Foundation, and fourth president of the International Olympic Committee.

== Early life ==
Edström was born in the tiny village of Morlanda, on the island of Orust, Bohuslän. He studied at Chalmers University of Technology in Gothenburg, where he graduated in 1891, and continued studying at ETH Zürich in Switzerland, and the United States. In his youth, he was a top sprinter, capable of finishing the 100 m in 11 seconds. While at ETH he was a member of Nordiska Roddföreningen i Zürich. He was the director of the Gothenburg trams from 1900 to 1903, where he was in charge of electrifying them, and of the electrotechnical company ASEA from 1903 to 1933, and president of ASEA's board from 1934 until 1939.

Edström was involved in Swedish sports administration, and helped organise the 1912 Summer Olympics in Stockholm. During the Olympics, the International Amateur Athletics Federation (IAAF) was established, and Edström was elected its first president, a position that he held until 1946.

== President of the IOC ==
Edström became a member of the International Olympic Committee (IOC) in 1920, and after holding a position on the Executive Committee, became vice-president in 1931. When IOC president Henri de Baillet-Latour died in 1942, Edström was the acting president until the end of World War II, when he was formally elected president. He played an important role in reviving the Olympic Movement after the war. In 1952, he retired from this position and was succeeded by Avery Brundage.

In 1931, Edström was involved in the controversial decision to ban Finnish runner Paavo Nurmi from competing at the 1932 Los Angeles Olympics, as he saw Nurmi as a professional athlete despite the fact that in April 1932 the Finnish Athletics Federation ruled in favor of Nurmi, finding no evidence for the allegations of professionalism. Less than three days before the 10,000 m, a special commission of the IAAF, consisting of the same seven members that had suspended Nurmi, rejected the Finn's entries and barred him from competing in Los Angeles. Edström, president of the IAAF and chairman of its executive council, stated that the full congress of the IAAF, which was scheduled to start the next day, could not reinstate Nurmi for the Olympics but merely review the phases and political angles related to the case. The AP called this "one of the slickest political maneuvers in international athletic history", and wrote that the Games would now be "like Hamlet without the celebrated Dane in the cast." Thousands protested against the action in Helsinki. Details of the case were not released to the press, but the evidence against Nurmi was believed be the sworn statements from German race promoters that Nurmi had received $250–500 per race when running in Germany in autumn 1931. The statements were produced by Karl Ritter von Halt, after Edström had sent him increasingly threatening letters warning that if evidence against Nurmi were not provided he would be "unfortunately obliged to take stringent action against the German Athletics Association." This affected Finland's relationship to Sweden negatively as Paavo Nurmi was considered a Finnish national hero. Nurmi finally got his revenge during 1952 Olympic Games in Helsinki when he brought the Olympic torch to the opening ceremony in the stadium and received a standing ovation in front of Edström.

Edström died in Stockholm on 18 March 1964.

== Published works ==
- Edström, J. Sigfrid (1946). Ruth Randall Edström 1867-1944. Västmanlands: Allehanda.

Civic offices
New title	Presidents of the IAAF; 1912–1946	Succeeded by (United Kingdom) Lord Burghley
Preceded by (Belgium) Henri de Baillet-Latour	President of the International Olympic Committee; 1942–1952	Succeeded by (United States) Avery Brundage
Preceded by (United Kingdom) Edward Battell	President of Organizing Committee for Summer Olympic Games; 1912	Succeeded by (Belgium) Henri de Baillet-Latour
