= Wattah Wattah Festival =

Filipino feast of John the Baptist

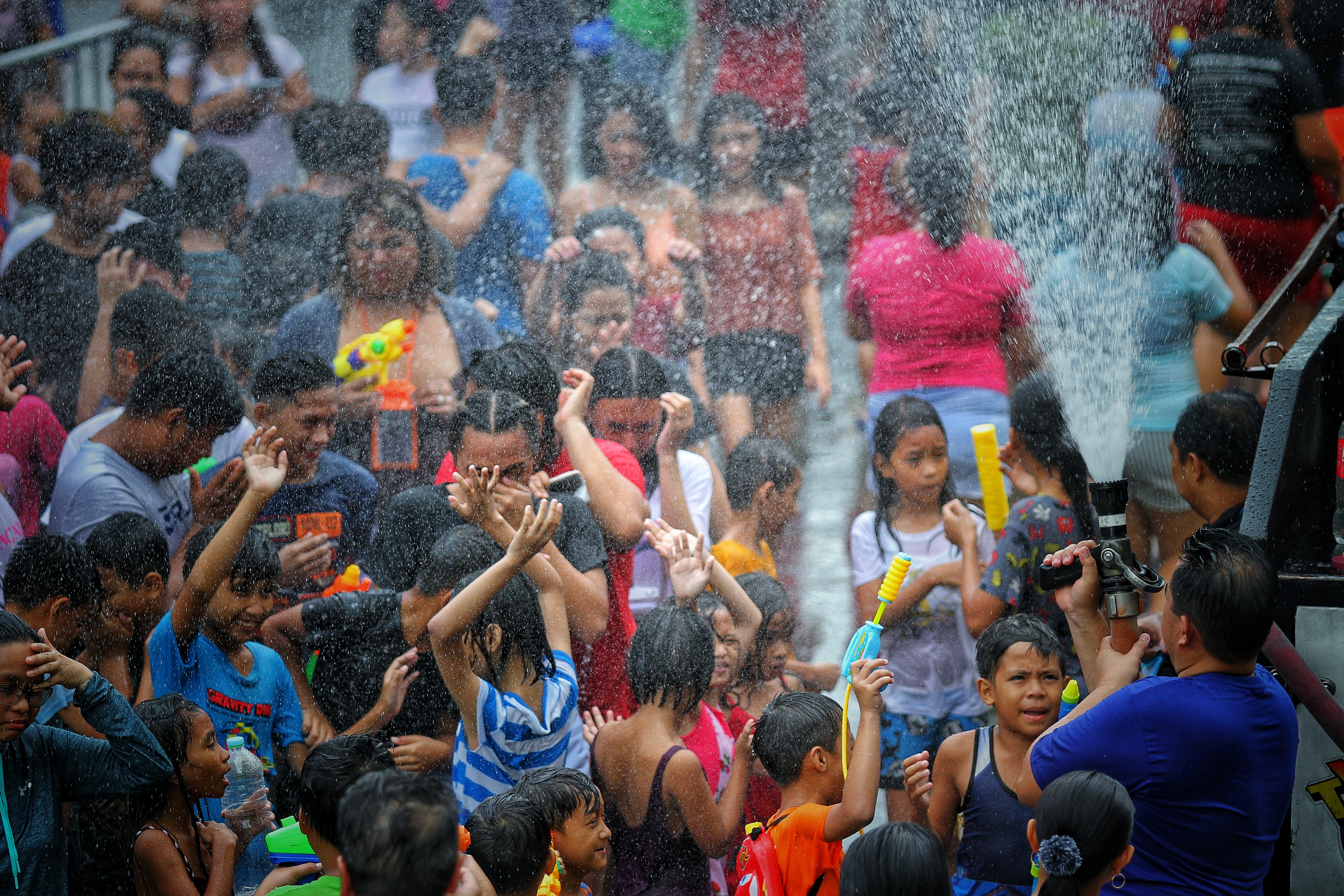
- Also called: Basaan Festival
- Observed by: San Juan, Metro Manila
- Significance: Feast of John the Baptist
- Observances: Dousing of water to people
- Date: June 24
- Next time: 24 June 2027
- Frequency: Annual

The Wattah Wattah Festival, also known as the Basaan Festival (lit. 'dousing of water'), is the feast of John the Baptist, the patron saint of San Juan, Metro Manila, and many other communities across the Philippines. It is held every June 24.

== Customs ==
Filipinos commemorate the birth of John the Baptist, who cleansed and prepared the people for the coming of Jesus by baptizing them with water. Along with the birthday of the Blessed Virgin Mary, John the Baptist's birthday is one of the few celebrated; most other saints are remembered on the day of their death or another significant date.

Matthew 3:11 quotes Saint John as saying:

"I indeed baptize you with water unto repentance but he that cometh after me is mightier than I, whose shoes I am not worthy to bear: he shall baptize you with the Holy Spirit, and with fire."

Children and adults alike line the streets and generously douse passersby or unsuspecting commuters and visitors with water in the traditional basaan (wetting of water) or buhusan (dousing of water) – supposedly to remind them of their baptism. They enjoy engaging in water wars and other wet games using dippers, pails, hoses, and water pistols. Older people may fill their ancient coconut shells with perfumed water to sprinkle on passersby. In rural areas, people swim at the beach, in a nearby river, or at a local spring, believing that a little exposure to water today, even just a sprinkle or splash, will bring God's blessings. This popular custom is practised as they recall Saint John's life and mission.

Filipinos from different parts of the country celebrate this feast in various ways. Four of the most popular celebrations are in Balayan, Batangas; Calumpit, Bulacan; Aliaga, Nueva Ecija; Cavite City; and San Juan, Metro Manila.

== Criticism ==
The festival has earned the ire of several citizens living around San Juan in 2024. Reports of celebrants recklessly dousing workers, students, and even public vehicles with passengers passing through the area have been noted. One such incident involved the hurling of muriatic acid on an unsuspecting bystander; the suspect has since been apprehended by local police and faces charges of physical injury. The city government has since apologized and pledged to investigate the ensuing chaos.
