= Yukina Shirakawa =

Japanese gravure idol (born 1985)

Yukina Shirakawa (白川ゆきな, Shirakawa Yukina; born June 24, 1985 in Shizuoka, Japan) is a Japanese gravure idol. She is from Shizuoka Pref., Japan.

== Activities ==
=== TV Programs ===
- Double H (ダブルH), TV Tokyo
- Idol Revolution (アイドルレボリューション)
- Yoru Bijo (夜美女), Sun TV
- Speed Wagon no Nama-dashi (スピードワゴンのナマ出し), GyaO

=== DVDs ===
1. Ero Tenshi Yukina (エロ天使ゆきな), Bunkasha 2005
2. EIGHT, Layfull 2006
3. Repress, CLEO 2006
4. Marionette (操り人形), CLEO 2007

=== Digital Photobook ===
1. EIGHT, Layfull 2006
