= Jan van de Werve, 7th Lord of Hovorst =

Flemish noble and knight

Jan van de Werve, 7th Lord of Hovorst (died 1622) was a Flemish noble and knight in the Spanish Netherlands.

== Family ==
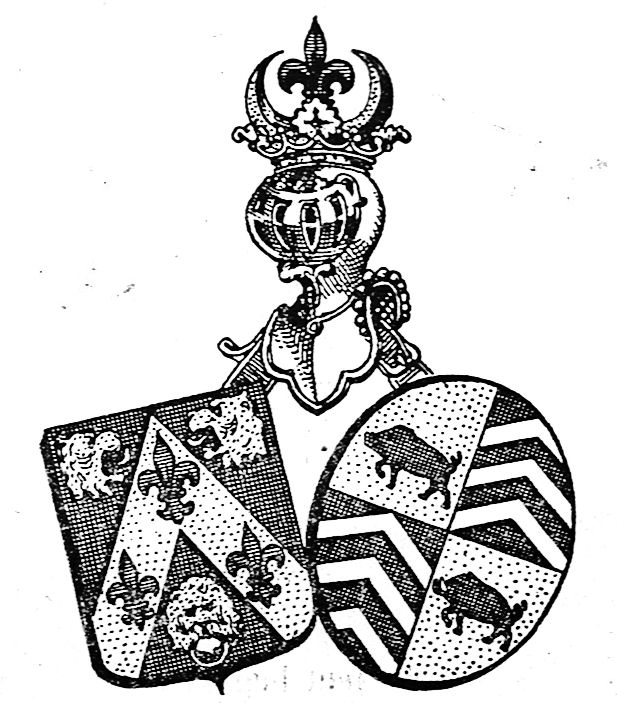
Isabelle Anne van de Werve, and John Baptiste della Faille

Van de Werve was the son of Jan van de Werve, 6th Lord of Hovorst and Margareth van Baexem.

He married Jossine Lomelline, Lady of the Archduchesse from Genovese nobility. He was succeeded as Lord of Hovorst by his son Auguste.

=== Descendants ===
1. Auguste van de Werve, 8th Lord of Hovorst, died 1647: married Mary Anne van de Werve, daughter of Guilliam van de Werve, Lord of Schilde. Their descendants still live today in Belgium, and became the Lords of Schilde and Vorsselaer.
2. Henri van de Werve, mayor of Antwerp in 1663.
3. Isabelle Anne van de Werve, married John Baptiste della Faille, mayor of Antwerp.

== Career ==
Van de Werve was counselor of war to Archduke Albrecht of Austria. He became by royal decree governor of Deynze.
