= René-Philippe van de Werve =

René-Philippe van de Werve de Vorsselaer (1850–1911) was a member of the Belgian nobility.

== Family ==
He was a member of the House of van de Werve, and a descendant of the branch of Charles III Philippe van de Werve, 1st Count of Vosselaer. He was the son of Philippe Marie Joseph Herman, Count van de Werve, and Léocadie Geelhand (1817-1866). He married Louise Bosschaert (1855-1888)

== Political career ==
From 1892 until 1900 he served as a member of the Belgian Senate for the arrondissement of Turnhout.

René-Philippe van de Werve House of van de Werve Born: 17 April 1850 Died: 25 May 1875
Regnal titles
Preceded by Philippe-Marie van de Werve	count van de Werve and of Vorselaar; 1840-1875	Succeeded by Léon-Philippe van de Werve
