= Jan van de Werve, 6th Lord of Hovorst =

Dutch noble (1522–1576)

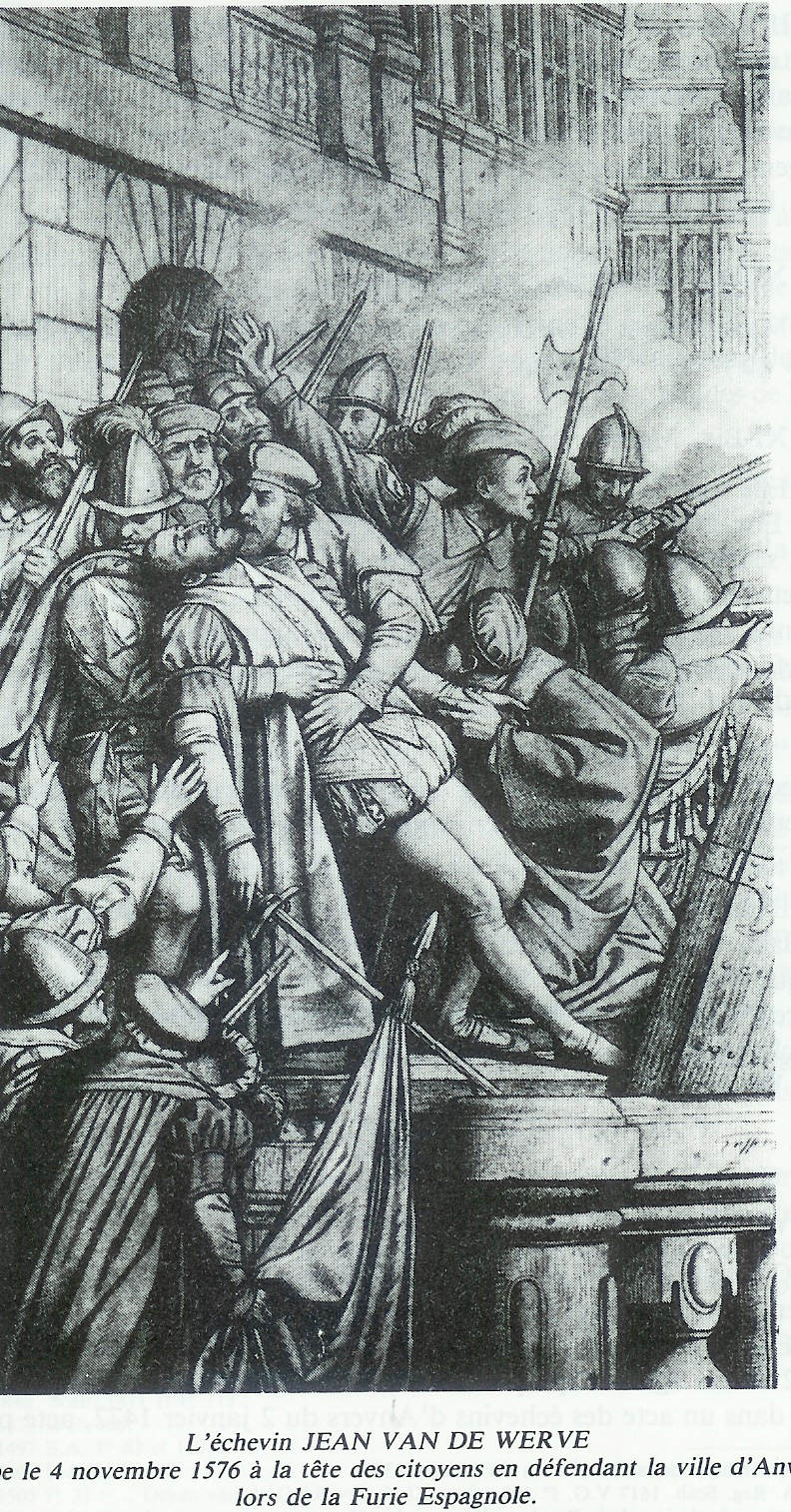
The death of the Lord of Hovorst by Godfried Guffens

Jan van de Werve (Antwerp, 1522–1576), Lord of Hovorst, Vierseldijk and Boechout was a member of the nobility and of the civic government of Antwerp.

== Family ==
Jan was the son of Gerald van de Werve, 5th Lord of Hovorst. He married three times with ladies of noble birth: 2nd with Claire Rockox. His uncle Martin was married to Mary of Ursel, sister of his brother-in-law: Lancelot II of Ursel. He became the uncle of Nicolaas II Rockox and Jacobus Dassa, all mayors of Antwerp. His final marriage was to Margareth van Baexem van Achterluyten. He was succeeded as Lord of Hovorst by his son Jan van de Werve, 7th Lord of Hovorst, who died in 1622.

== Career ==
Van de Werve studied canon law, and followed his father in a career of service to the city of Antwerp, serving numerous terms as an alderman between 1533 and 1570. During the Sack of Antwerp by Spanish mutineers from the Army of Flanders, Van de Werve tried to defend Antwerp City Hall form destruction. His was one of the 7,000 lives that were lost in the sack.

== Author ==
He wrote a Dutch dictionary, Den schat der Duytscher talen, which was first published in 1553 and went through many editions.
