= Ruth Randall Edström =

American activist

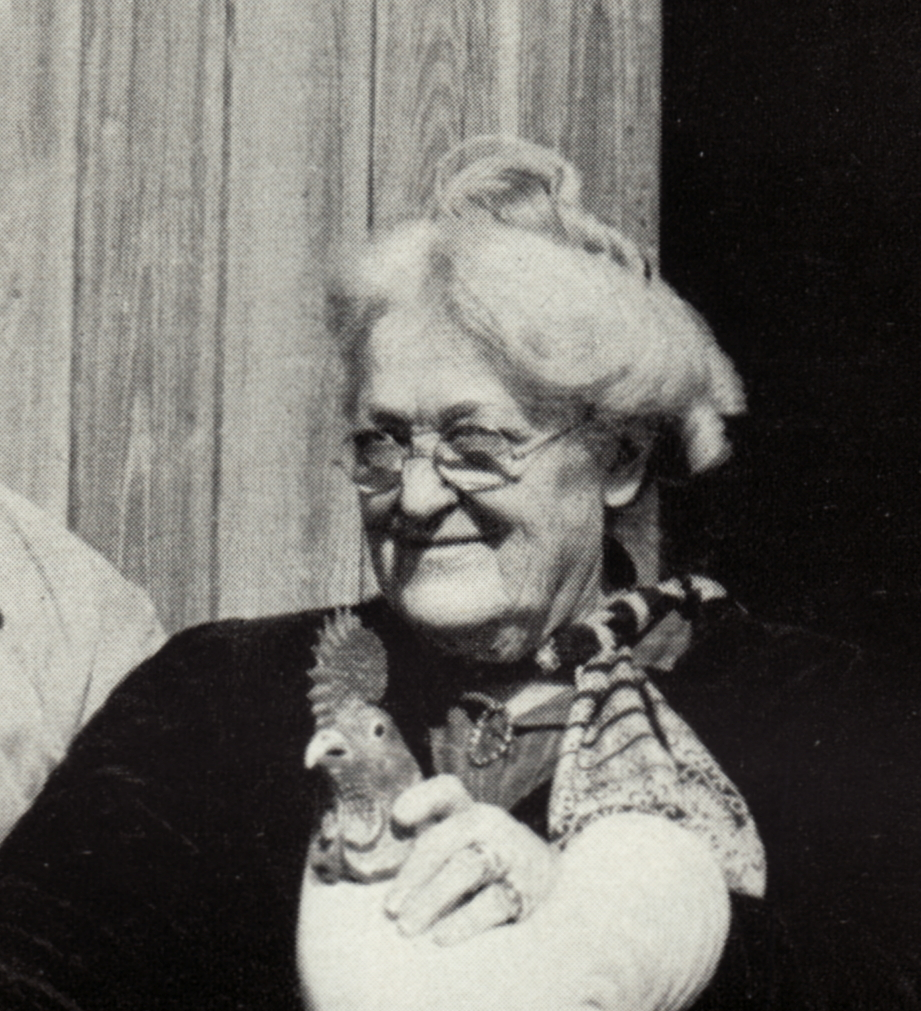
Ruth Randall Edström

Ruth Miriam Edström (née Randall; June 24, 1867 – October 5, 1944) was an American peace activist and fighter for women's rights. She worked with the pre-work for the third peace conference in The Hague (after the first conferences in 1899 and 1907). She participated in the international women's congress in 1915. Ruth was the wife of the head of Asea, J. Sigfrid Edström.

== Early life ==
Ruth Randall was the eldest of seven siblings born in Wilmington, Illinois, to Oscar Theodore Randall and Jane Mariah (née Lewis) Randall. The family moved to Chicago in 1870 and settled in the suburbs, a few miles from the city centre.

In 1871, the Great Chicago Fire burnt down the Randall's shop, however, their house survived.

The Randall family belonged to the Reformed Church, but later started to attend service at the Unity Chapel that belonged to All Souls Unitarian Church, where Jenkin Lloyd Jones preached.

The children were educated in the Unitarian belief system at the Church, specifically being taught religious and philosophical education. They became friends with author Ralph Waldo Emerson and Robert Browning and many others, often participating in the end of year historical party, with dramas of Charles Dickens and Charles Kingsley. In one instance, Ruth suggested the play about Hypatia to be performed, and got to select the actors and direct the play.

== Education and later life ==
After a two year course at Cook County Normal School for Teachers, Randall worked at a public primary school in Chicago. She was shortly headhunted to work at the Forestville School in Chicago.

In the summer of 1896 the teachers of the school went on a trip to Europe, they traveled by the new atlantic steam boat Etruria, where Randall met Swedish engineer Sigfrid Edström, who was moving to work for an electric company in Cleveland, Ohio. They wed on Randall's 32nd birthday, June 24, 1899, at her home in Chicago. They resided in Switzerland were Sigfrid work for a tramway company in Zürich, until the couple moved to Sweden, where Edström was named the head of Gothenburg's tramway system.

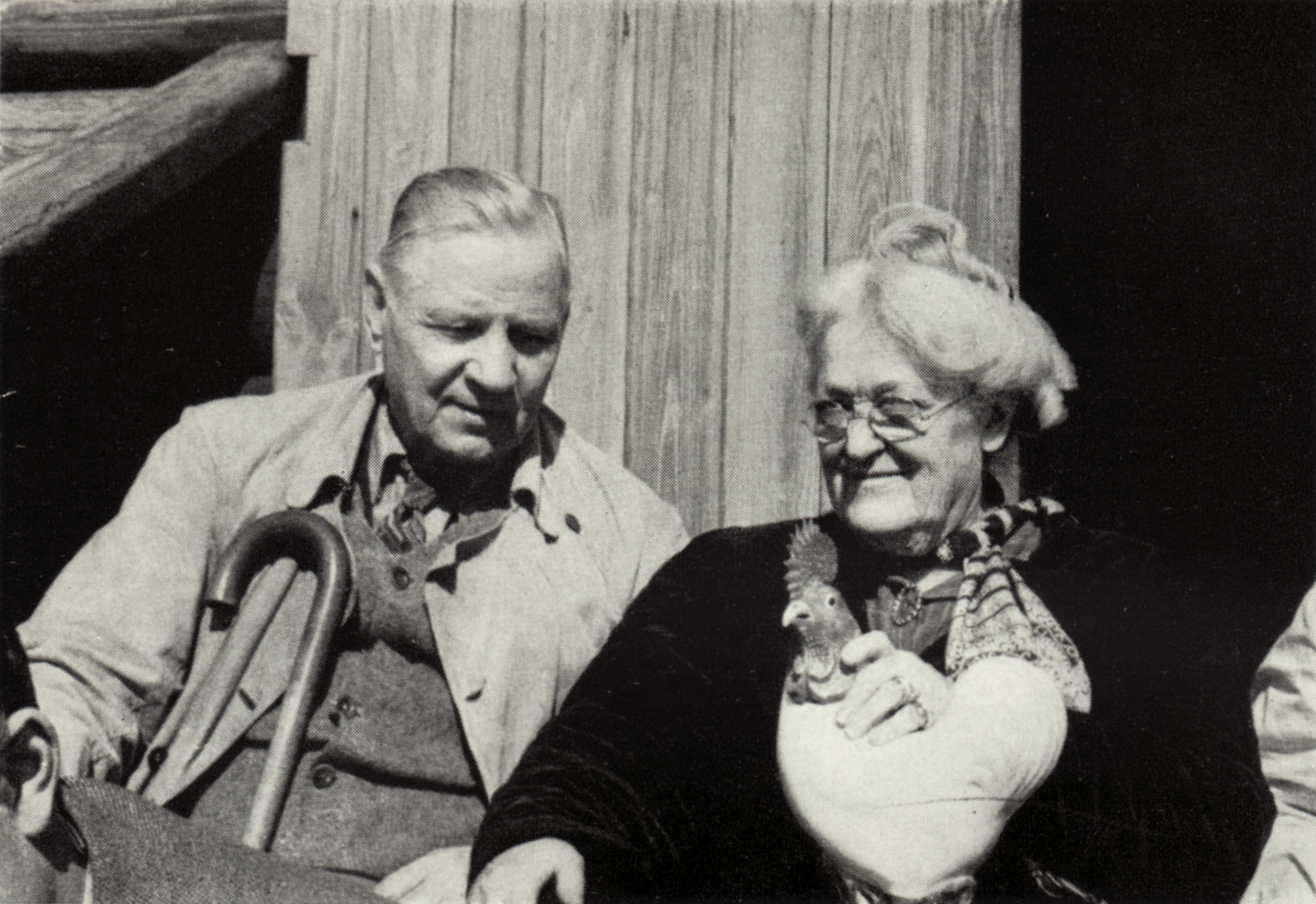
Ruth and Sigfrid Edström, in the late 1930s.

In the summer of 1903, she, her husband and their two children, Miriam and Björn, moved to Västerås, where Sigfrid worked for the stock company ASEA. Randall served as an ambassador for ASEA’s social outreach activities, helping women and children in Västerås who had been affected by rationing and unemployment. The company's success prompted the Edströms to build a house in Stallhagen, named Villa Asea. When the house was ready in 1908, the couple hosted an opening, for friends and the city mayor.

In Västerås she was involved in setting up a local section of Föreningen för kvinnans politiska rösträtt (FKPR, women’s suffrage association) in 1906. She was on the board and for some years she served as its deputy representative on the central committee of Landsföreningen för Kvinnans Politiska Röstratt (LKPR, national association for women’s suffrage).

Randall had four children altogether, Myriam (1900), Björn (1903), Jane Sigrid known as Janesie (1906), and Lenore (1910).

After her death in 1944 in Stockholm, a memory fund for Ruth Randall Edström was created.
