= Gerald van de Werve, 5th Lord of Hovorst =

Belgian politician

Gerald van de Werve, 5th Lord of Hovorst, died 1534 was a Flemish politician, he was Mayor of Antwerp.

== Family ==
He was the son of Henry van de Werve, 4th Lord of Hovorst and Margharethe of Wymaer. He married Anne of Malines, daughter of Henry of Malines, Mayor of Antwerp. His brothers in law were: John of Malines was abbot of Grimbergen Abbey, Florent of Malines, Lord Mayor of Liere and Conrard Pot and Lancelot II of Ursel, majors of Antwerp. From this marriage:

- John III van de Werve, Lord of Hovorst, (1522-1576): alderman of Antwerp.
- Margheretha van de Werve, marr. John de Mingerfruyt, Lord of Cruybeecke and Wisschekercke.

== Career ==
Gerald functioned as Mayor of Antwerp between 1521 and 1529. In 1521, he received Albrecht Dürer in Antwerp, this was commemorated by Godfried Guffens.
