= Zandhoven =

- Municipality
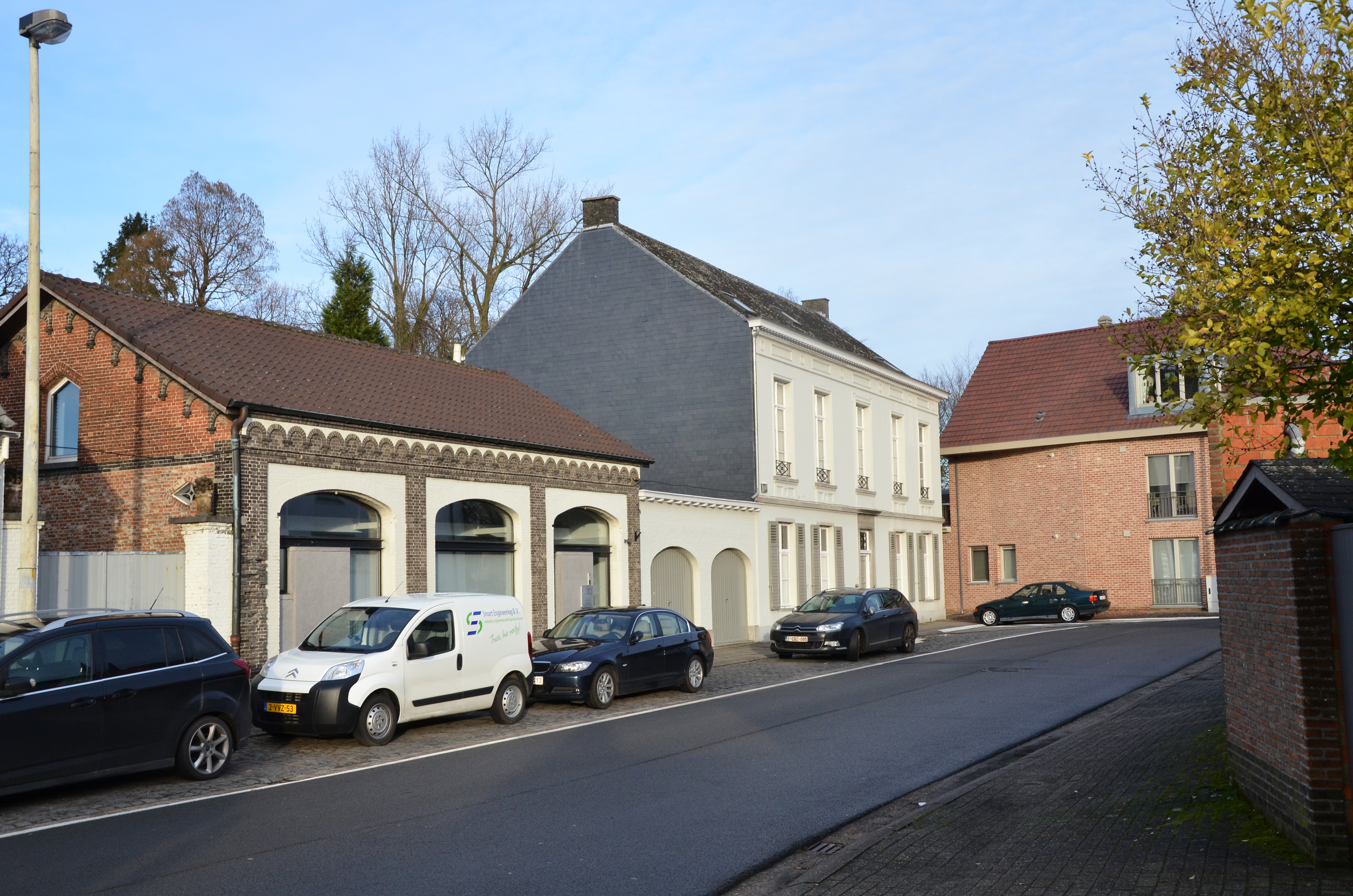

- Flag Coat of arms

- Location of Zandhoven in the province of Antwerp
- Interactive map of Zandhoven
- Location in Belgium
- Coordinates: 51°13′N 04°39′E
- Country: Belgium
- Community: Flemish Community
- Region: Flemish Region
- Province: Antwerp
- Arrondissement: Antwerp

Government
  - Mayor: Lucas Van Hove (CD&V)
  - Governing party: CD&V

Area
  - Total: 40.1 km^{2} (15.5 sq mi)

Population (2018-01-01)
  - Total: 12,985
  - Density: 324/km^{2} (839/sq mi)
- Postal codes: 2240, 2242, 2243
- NIS code: 11054
- Area codes: 03
- Website: www.zandhoven.be

Zandhoven (Dutch pronunciation: [ˈzɑntɦoːvə(n)]) is a municipality in the Belgian province of Antwerp. The municipality comprises the villages of Massenhoven, Pulderbos, Pulle, Viersel and Zandhoven proper. In 2021, Zandhoven had a population of 13,124. The total area is 40.10 km^{2}.

== History ==
In Pulle, a motorway bridge, over the Nete (river) collapsed in mid-November 1966, which killed two people.

== Sports ==
Women's volleyball club VBC Zandhoven plays at the highest level of the Belgian league pyramid.
