= Vorselaar =

- Municipality
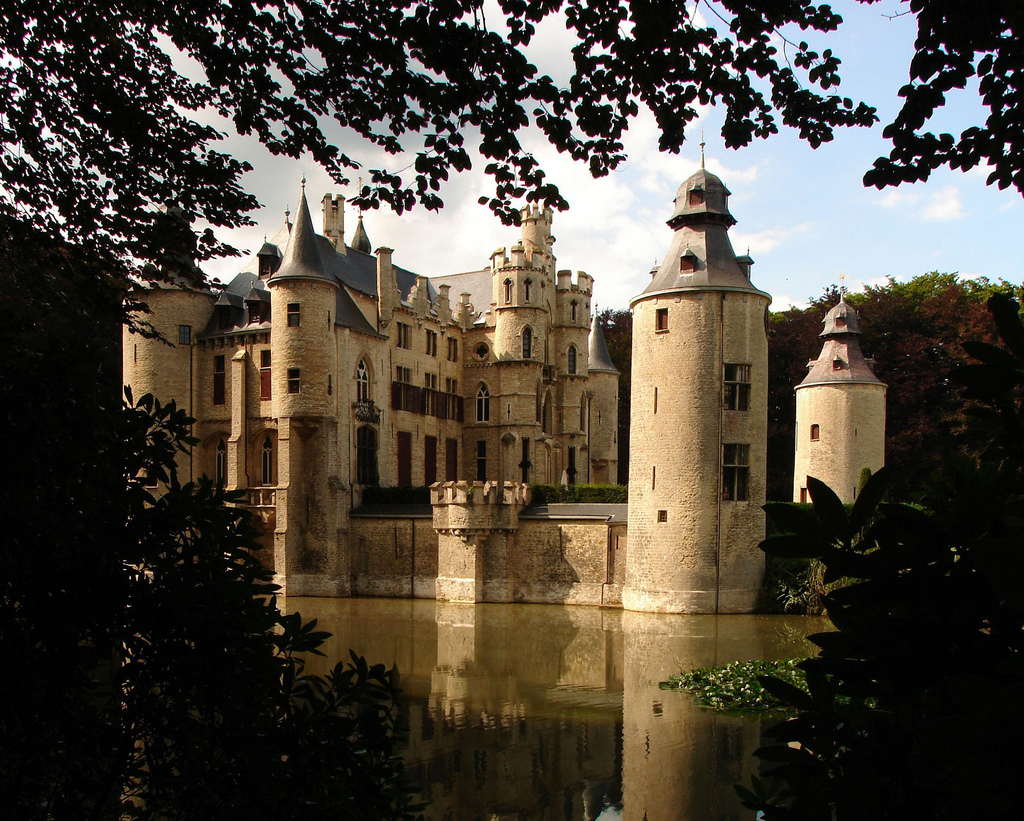

- Flag Coat of arms

- Location of Vorselaar in the province of Antwerp
- Interactive map of Vorselaar
- Location in Belgium
- Coordinates: 51°12′N 04°46′E
- Country: Belgium
- Community: Flemish Community
- Region: Flemish Region
- Province: Antwerp
- Arrondissement: Turnhout

Government
  - Mayor: Lieven Janssens (ActieV)
  - Governing parties: ActieV, CD&V

Area
  - Total: 27.62 km^{2} (10.66 sq mi)

Population (2018-01-01)
  - Total: 7,848
  - Density: 284.1/km^{2} (735.9/sq mi)
- Postal codes: 2290
- NIS code: 13044
- Area codes: 014, 03
- Website: www.vorselaar.be

Vorselaar (Dutch pronunciation: [ˈvɔrsəlaːr]) is a municipality located in the Belgian province of Antwerp. The municipality comprises only the town of Vorselaar proper. In 2021, Vorselaar had a total population of 7,995. The total area is 27.62 km^{2}.

== Famous inhabitants ==
- Cardinal Jozef-Ernest van Roey (b. Vorselaar, 13 January 1874-Mechelen, 6 August 1961)
- Bart Wellens, Cyclo-cross champion.
