= Depth Hate =

- Origin: Guarujá, São Paulo, Brazil
- Genres: Heavy Metal
- Years active: 2009–2017
- Members: Priscila Soares - Vocal; Marcelo Figueiredo - Guitar; Márcio Leite - Drums; Pedro Pessoa - Bass
- Past members: Milton Felix - Bass; Zensk Metal - Drums
- Website: http://depthhate.wixsite.com/depthhate

Depth Hate was a Brazilian heavy metal band formed in 2009 on the outskirts of the city of Guarujá.

The band has as main characteristics a heavy sound with psychedelic nuances, and lyrics sung in English addressing social contexts and human behavior.

According to a ranking of the site ReverbNation, which uses as criteria the activity of the band within the site itself, and numbers of movement of the main social networks (Facebook, Twitter, YouTube), schedule of shows and other forms of virtual advertising, the band in 2015 Was in the second position among the 10 Brazilian bands of the metal most engaged in social networks, taking first place in February 2016 and remaining in the lead up to the present day. Already in the global sphere in the global ranking of the site that has 3.8 Millions of subscribers and bands from 250 countries, the band has been in the Top 50 since May 2015.

Unfortunately in 2017 a band ended its activities.

== History ==
=== Start ===
In the mid-1990s, guitarist Marcelo Figueiredo, who was already an important presence in the underground music scene of the city of Guarujá, decides to create a band to give vent to his own compositions, but faces a recurring problem: Local musicians did not believe in authorial music, preferring to dedicate themselves to cover songs of their idols.

After more than a decade of attempts and frustrations, Marcelo finally manages to gather musicians interested in his ideas, and with Priscila Soares in vocals, Milton Felix on bass and Zensk Metal on drums, in 2009 the band Depth Hate is formed.

With this formation in 2011, the band does a series of shows in places considered important rock strongholds, in the city of São Paulo there were three shows: one at Blackmore Rock Bar, and two at Fofinho Rock Bar. In the city of Santos two more shows at the Coliseu do Rock, and in the city of Santo André in the Central Rock Bar, always putting to the test its sound autoral and obtaining excellent response of the public.

In 2012 with the departure of Zensk, the drummer Márcio Leite joins the band, the band then begins a period of composition and lapidation of their own sound, deciding to face the financial difficulties, the band decides to record their songs independently even if it had To do this Have patience to do little by little, since the band itself will take care of all the costs of the recording process, along with that, at the same time Milton leaves the band, entering in its place the bass player Pedro Pessoa.

=== International Repercussion ===
With this formation in the second semester of 2013 the band enters in studio and records the songs, "In the darkness of hours" and "Stage of mind", and decides to spread the songs through the internet, a few months later already in 2014, the band returns to the studio records and releases the songs, "Zombie" and "Soon the eternity", from there the band begins to have a huge growth of activity in its pages and social networks, arousing the interest of fans of heavy metal and specialized media both in Brazil and abroad, and the songs "In the darkness of hours", "Stage of mind" and "Zombie," are selected for the soundtrack of the first episode of the Mexican program Tattoo Wars Mexico, after winning careful selection which involved bands from around the world.

Taking advantage of the excellent repercussion of its material, on December 31, 2014, the band launches on its YouTube channel the video clip of the song "Soon the eternity", the clip is dark and brings as a subject a suicide and ends up having excellent repercussion both In Brazil, and abroad, so much so that the video clip is selected by Mish Mash Network to be part of episode 78 of the American program InsaniTV, which brings video clips from bands from around the world, being one of the few Brazilian bands to have participated in the program, Alongside all of this here in Brazil the music video continued to be widely shown on subscription channels affiliated with PlayTv.

A few months later, in 2015 the band returns to the studio to record and release the songs, "Save Me" and "Subconscious", and once again the band can select "Save me" to be part of this time Soundtrack of the fourth episode of the Mexican program Tattoo Wars Mexico, being until now the only Brazilian band to participate in the soundtrack of the program.

By this time the songs of the band were already playing in several radios and webradios from various parts of the world and it was not long before the band granted its first interview in English to the Swedish blog specialized in bands of the world underground Ghgumman Blogg of Robex Lundgren.

=== Recognition in the brazilian underground scene The end ===
Some months later, in November 2015, the band performed in Santos at Studio Rock Café, and once again the band put their repertoire of authorship to the test causing great repercussion for their live performance.

In early 2016 the band returned to the studio, recorded and released the songs, "Nothing can kill your heart" and "Memories of my past", both were very well received by the fans of heavy metal, with that the band added eight recorded songs and digitally available for purchase on major streaming platforms and is considered one of the emerging bands in the underground scene.

=== The end ===
In 2017, disagreements among its members caused the band to end its activities, ending a promising trajectory.
