= Santos-Dumont hearse pavilion =

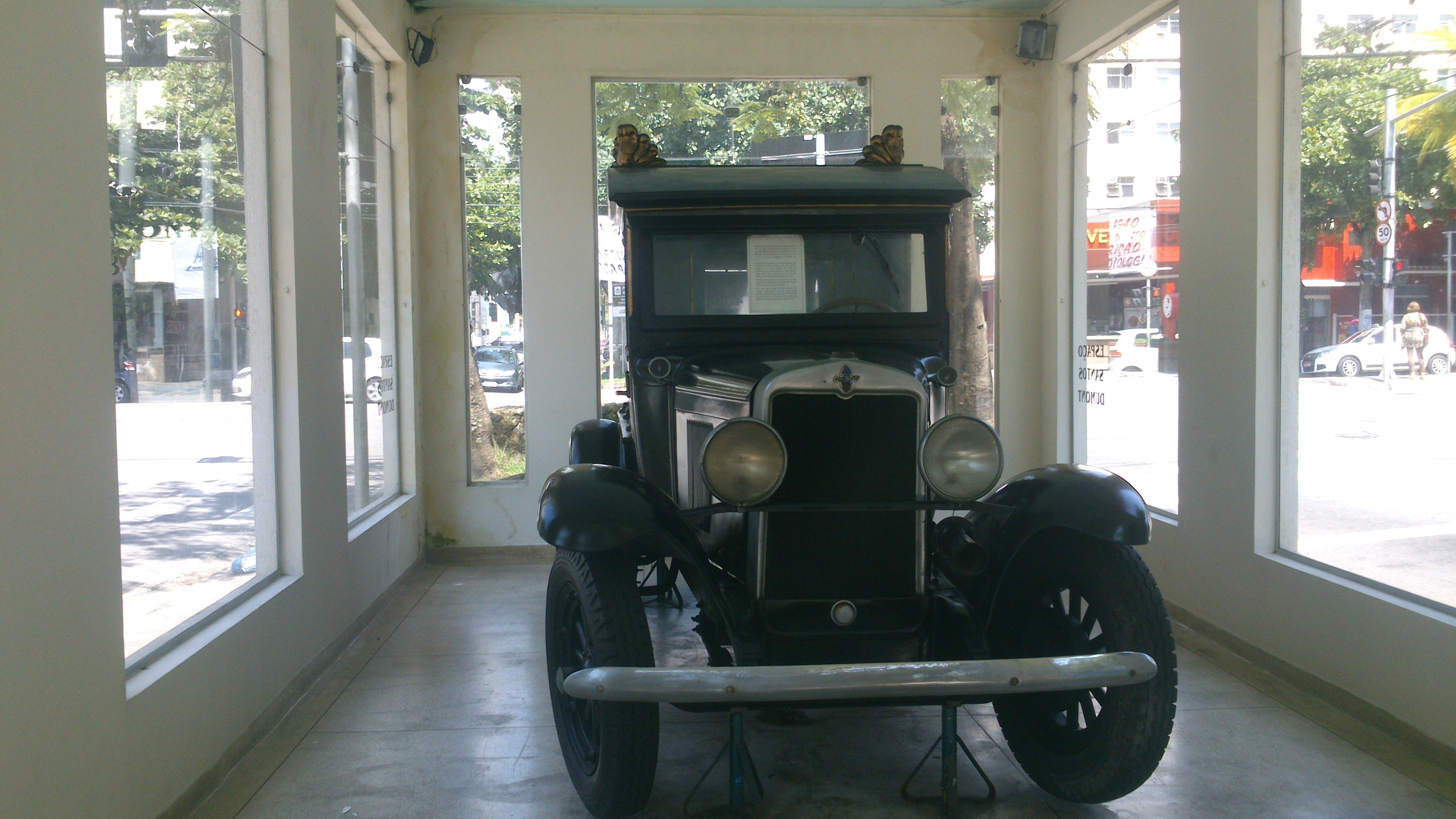

General information
- Type: tourist attraction
- Location: Guarujá, Brazil
- Coordinates: 23°59′41″S 46°15′33″W
- Closed: 2017

The Santos-Dumont hearse pavilion was a tourist attraction located in Guarujá, Brazil, which housed the 1929 Chevrolet Ramona that was the hearse that carried the body of the Brazilian aviator Alberto Santos-Dumont after he committed suicide at the Grand Hôtel La Plage, in Guarujá, on July 23, 1932.

== Car model ==
The Chevrolet Ramona model that drove the Santos-Dumont body was made from 70% wood and had a six-cylinder engine.

== Funeral ==
On the day of Santos-Dumont's funeral, the hearse passed by Avenida Puglisi, going to the Santos–Guarujá crossing ferry, towards the city of São Paulo, and then to the state of Rio de Janeiro, where he was buried.

== Display ==
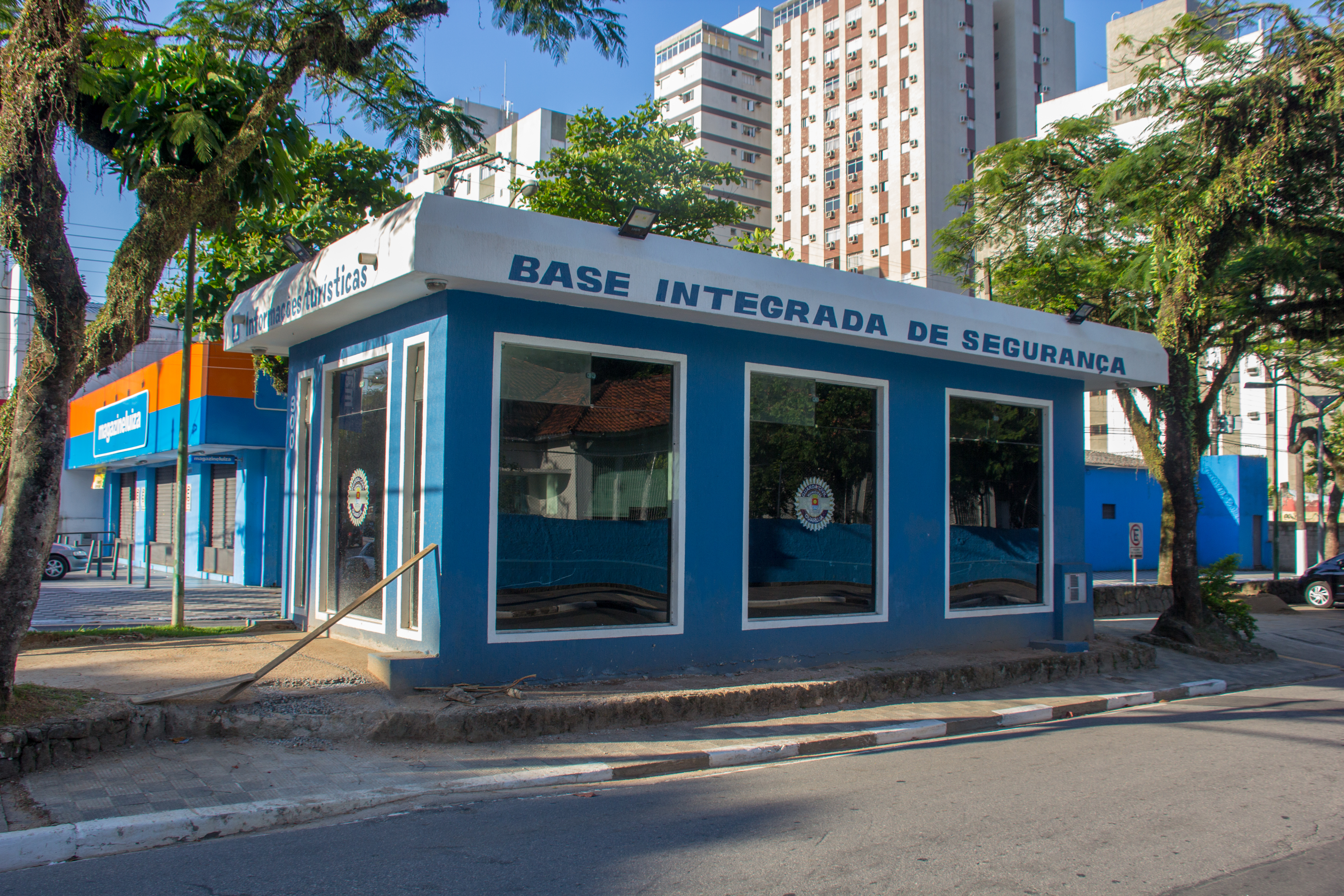
The pavilion that used to house the hearse, now a police station

The hearse was on display in the city of Guarujá, on the coast of São Paulo. It was in a purpose-built pavilion on the central division of Avenida Puglisi. In front of it was the Pavilhão da Maria Fumaça, with which she was paired. In addition to the historical connection, the Chevrolet Carmona model is a rarity and contains numerous details. However, in 2017 it was removed from the site by the city and taken to the city hall garage without further explanation. The pavilion was subsequently converted into a police station.
