= Andradas Fort =

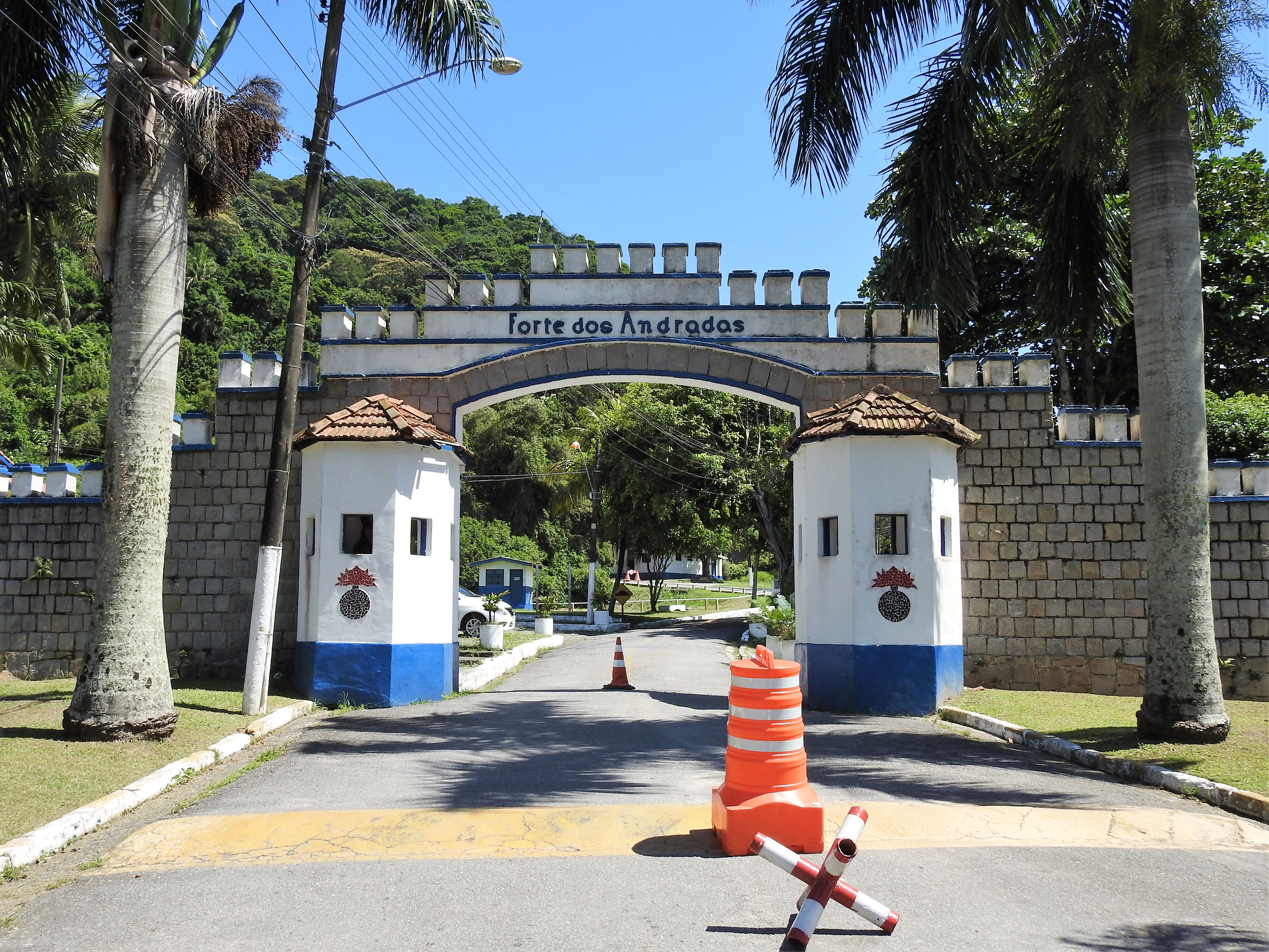

Location
- Coordinates: 24°01′24″S 46°17′02″W

The Andradas Fort (Portuguese: Forte dos Andradas, originally Portuguese: Forte do Monduba) is a fortification in the Morro do Monduba, at Guarujá, in the state of São Paulo in Brazil.

== Purpose ==
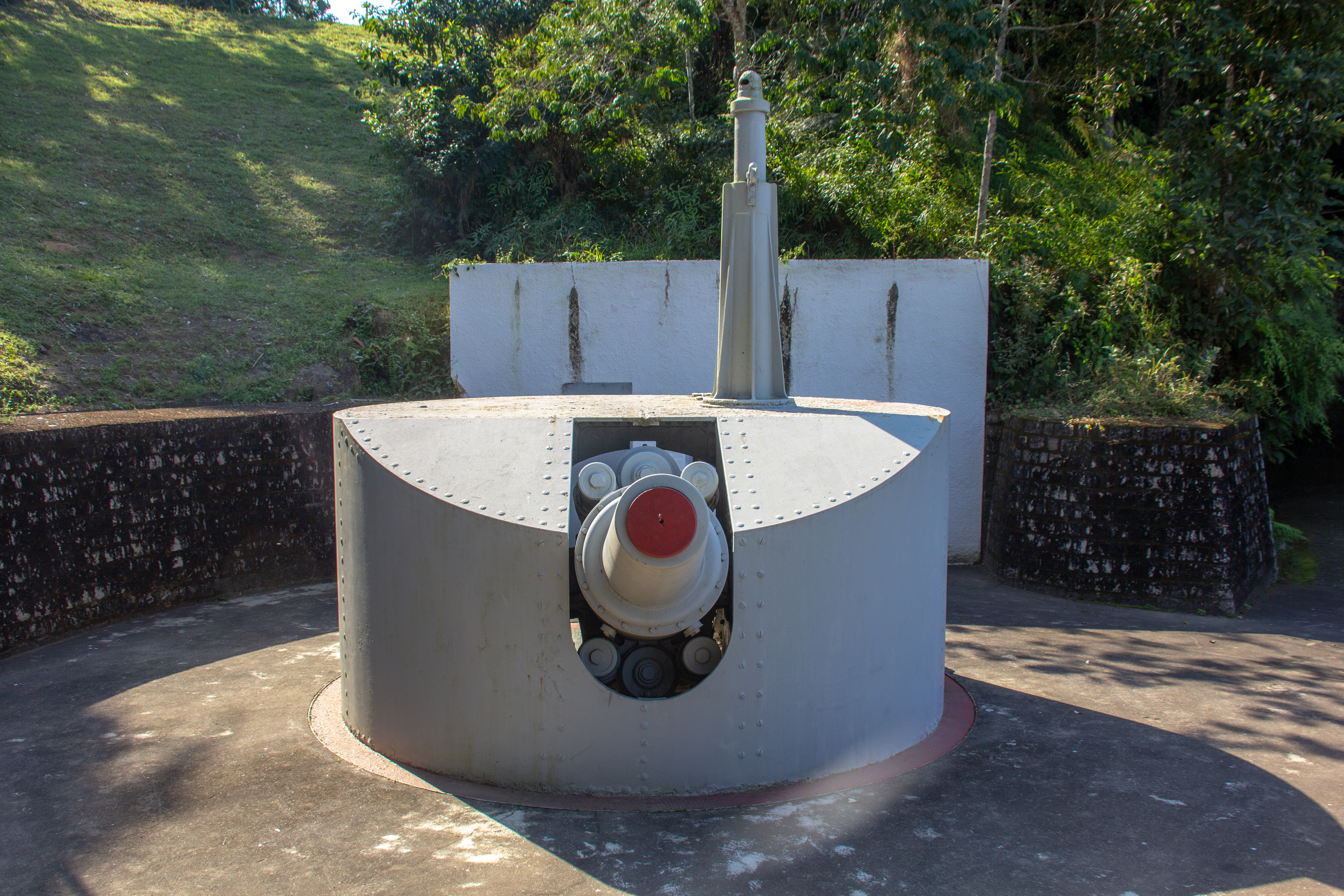
One of the gun emplacements

The fort was constructed, along with the Itaipu Fortress (Portuguese: Fortaleza de Itaipu), in order to defend Santos bay and its port. It was home to the 5th Independent Battery of Artillery of Coast (Portuguese: 5ª Bateria Independente de Artilharia de Costa).

== Design ==
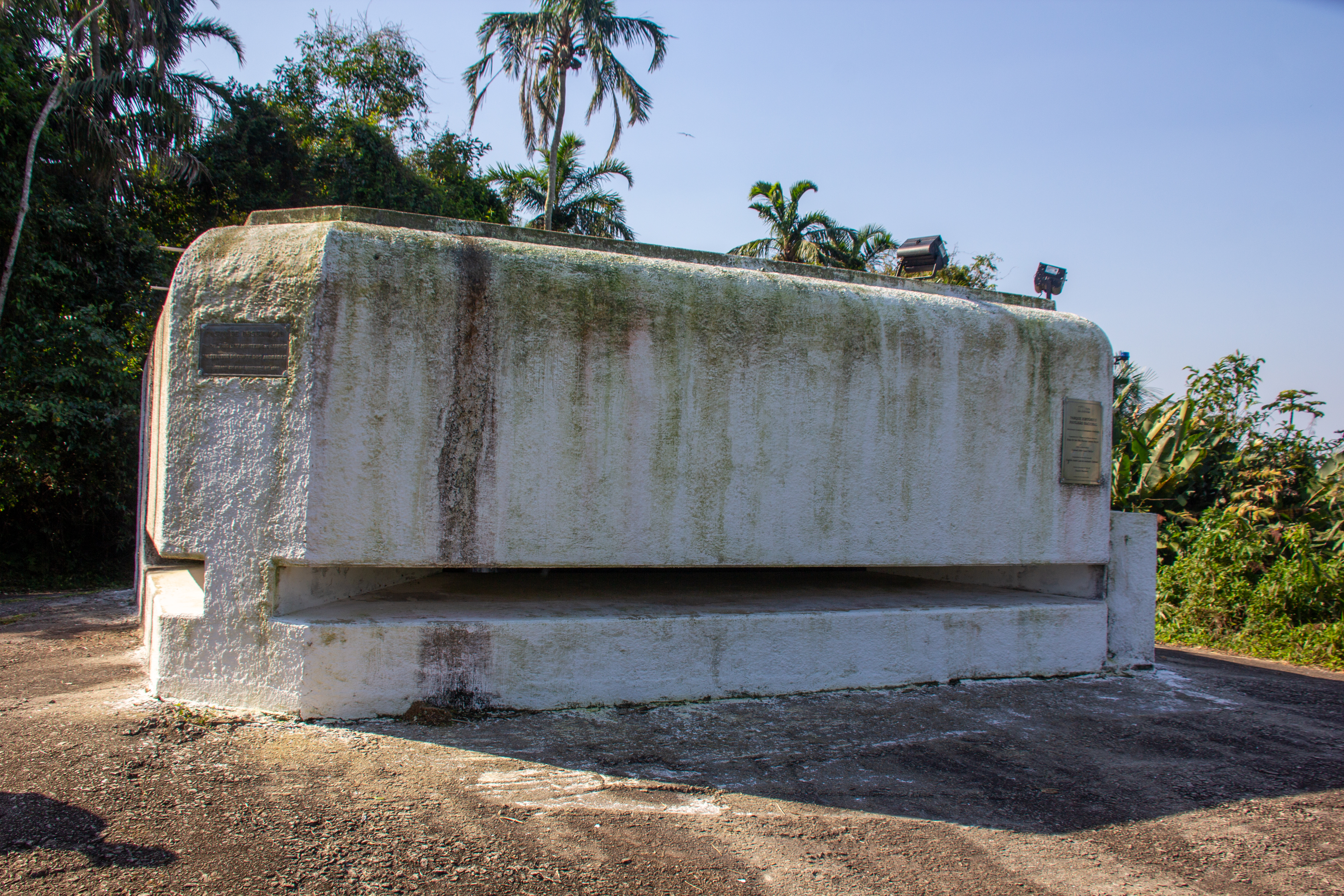
The observation post

The fort hosts four Krupp guns, each with 280 millimetres (11 in), 300 pounds (140 kg) ammunition with a range of 12 kilometres (7.5 miles). An observatory post, with a telescope and a pair of telemeters, calculated distances and positions of the ships approaching the bay. Three underground arched tunnels, one 200 metres (660 ft) and two 50 metres (160 ft) long, connect the facilities together, as well as housing six ammunition depots and a power room (housing a 3-phase 139V generator), plus a kitchen, canteen and toilet facilities. It was designed so that most of the structure was underground and hidden behind an "invisible curtain" of trees.

== Construction and operation ==
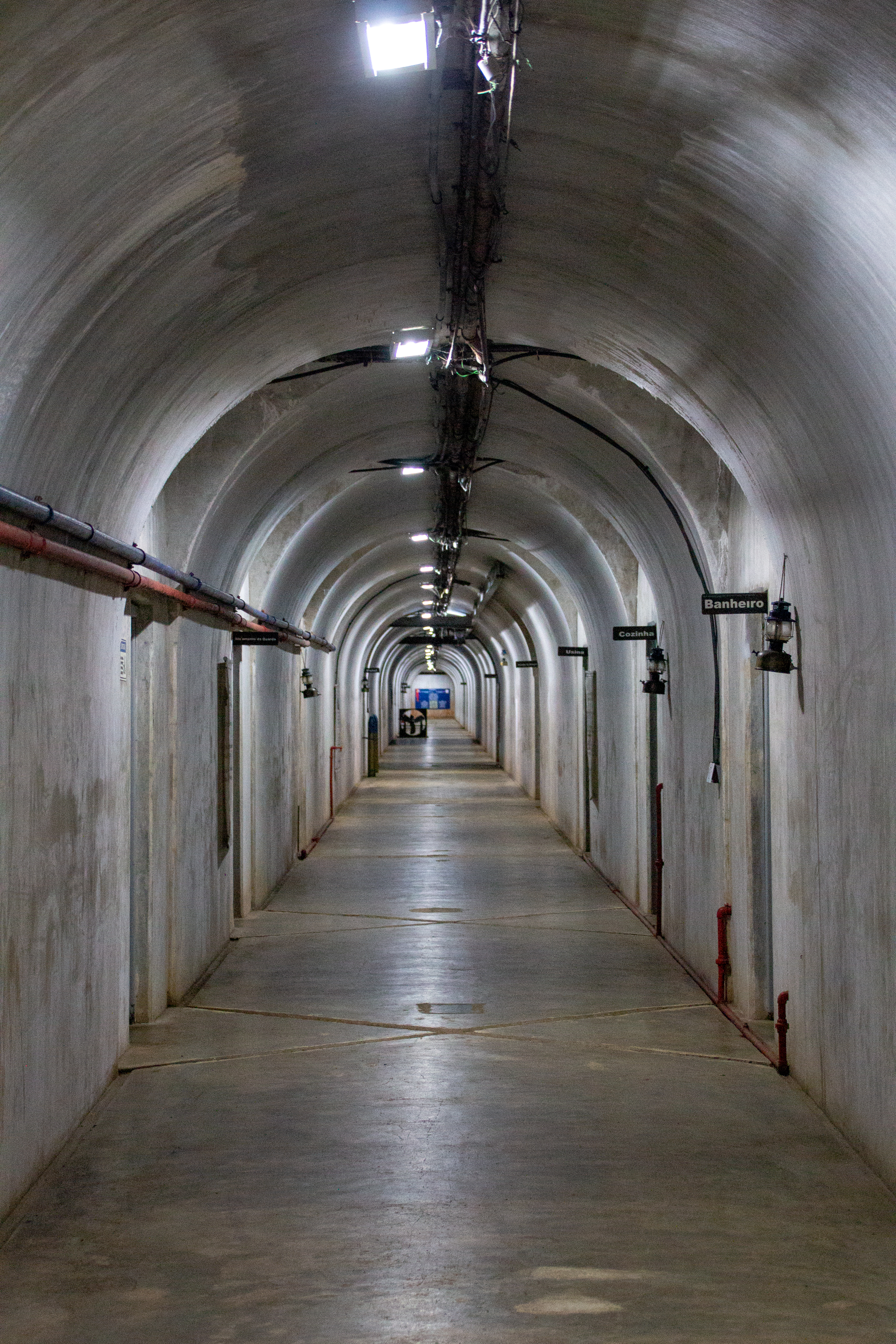
Looking down the main underground corridor

The fort was designed in 1934. Construction started in 1938 to provide protection of the port during World War II. It was inaugurated on 10 November 1942 as Forte do Monduba - the last fort in Brazil to be inaugurated. It was later renamed as the Andradas Fort after José Bonifácio de Andrada, Antônio Carlos Ribeiro de Andrada and Martim Francisco Ribeiro de Andrada.

It housed political prisoners, including Eduardo Collen Leite, during the military dictatorship in the 1960s.

The fortification was decommissioned in 1972, with the last 32 grenades launched in a training exercise with 8 kilometres (5.0 miles) range on 28 January 1972. The military base continues to operate as support for the Peace Headquarters and the 1st Brazilian Anti-Aircraft Artillery Brigade.

== Preservation ==
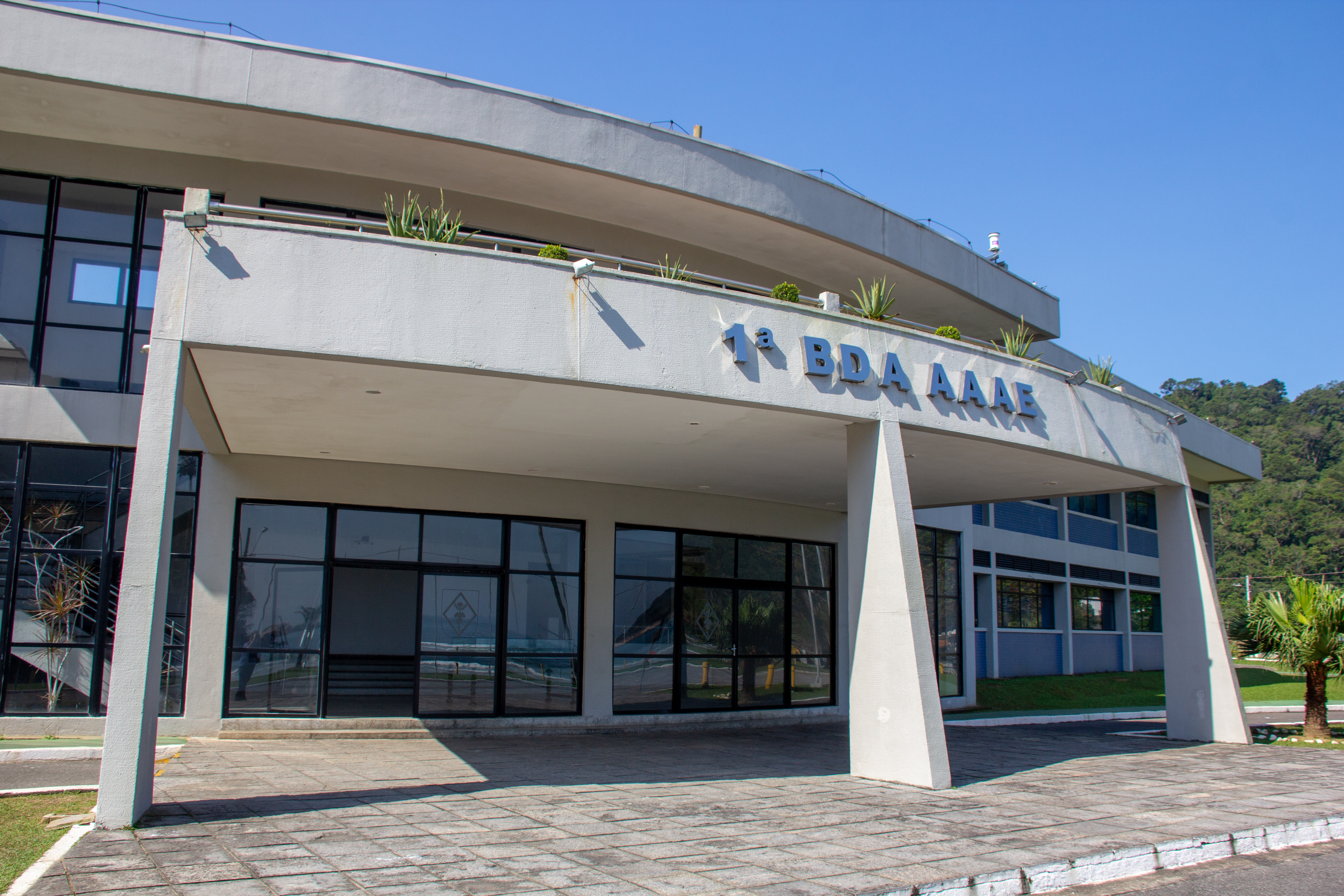
The modern military base near the beach

The fort is now preserved. It is located in the Morro do Monduba, a 2.1 million square metres (23,000,000 sq ft) preserve that is part of the Atlantic Forest, on Guarujá. Tours of the fort started in 2016.

Tours of the fort are free, and take place on Tuesday, Thursday, Friday, Saturday and Sunday at 09.00 and 14.00. They have to be scheduled in advance by phone or email. The entrance to the fortification is on Rua Horácio Barreiro, in Tombo.
