= Maria Antonieta de Brito =

Brazilian politician (born 1969)

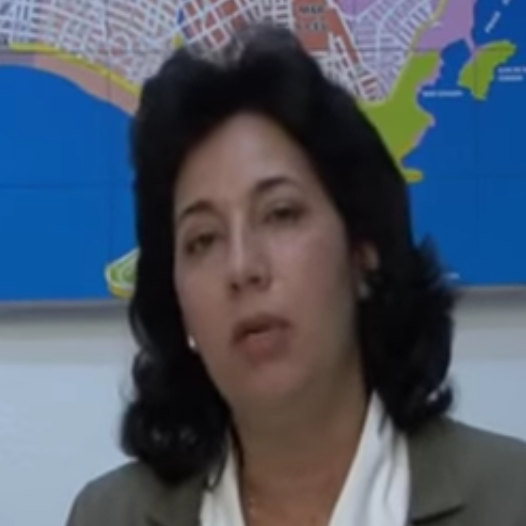
- De Brito in 2011
- Born: April 19, 1969 (age 57); Guarujá, Brazil
- Known for: mayor of Guarujá

Maria Antonieta de Brito (born April 19, 1969) is a Brazilian teacher and politician. She was the mayor of Guarujá twice.

== Life ==
Brito was born in the Morrinhos neighborhood in Guarujá, on April 19, 1969. She was the eldest daughter of Erasmo Aprigio de Brito and Waldemira Maria de Brito. Her parents are from the northeast and moved to Guarujá in the 1960s.

She trained to be a teacher and for nearly 20 years she taught chemistry, Environment, Mathematics and Science in Guaruja. In 1990, she was approved in the public contest for teachers at 1º de Maio Municipal School, where she taught regularly since then, until she took over the prefecture of Guarujá in January 2009.

In 1991, Maria Antonieta de Brito entered college with technological study at Universidade Santa Cecília, concluding her academic training in 1995. The following year, she began and completed a degree in chemistry.

In 2004, she failed to be elected as vice-mayor to Nelson Fernandes who lost to Farid Madi (PDT). In 2006, she failed to get a seat in the Legislative Assembly. The following year, Antonieta joined the Brazilian Democratic Movement Party.

In 2009, she was elected to be the mayor of her home town. She won the first round of the election taking 52% of the votes.

She is a tax advisor to the São Paulo Association of Municipalities and vice-president of Public Finances at the National Front of Mayors
