= Pavilhão da Maria Fumaça =

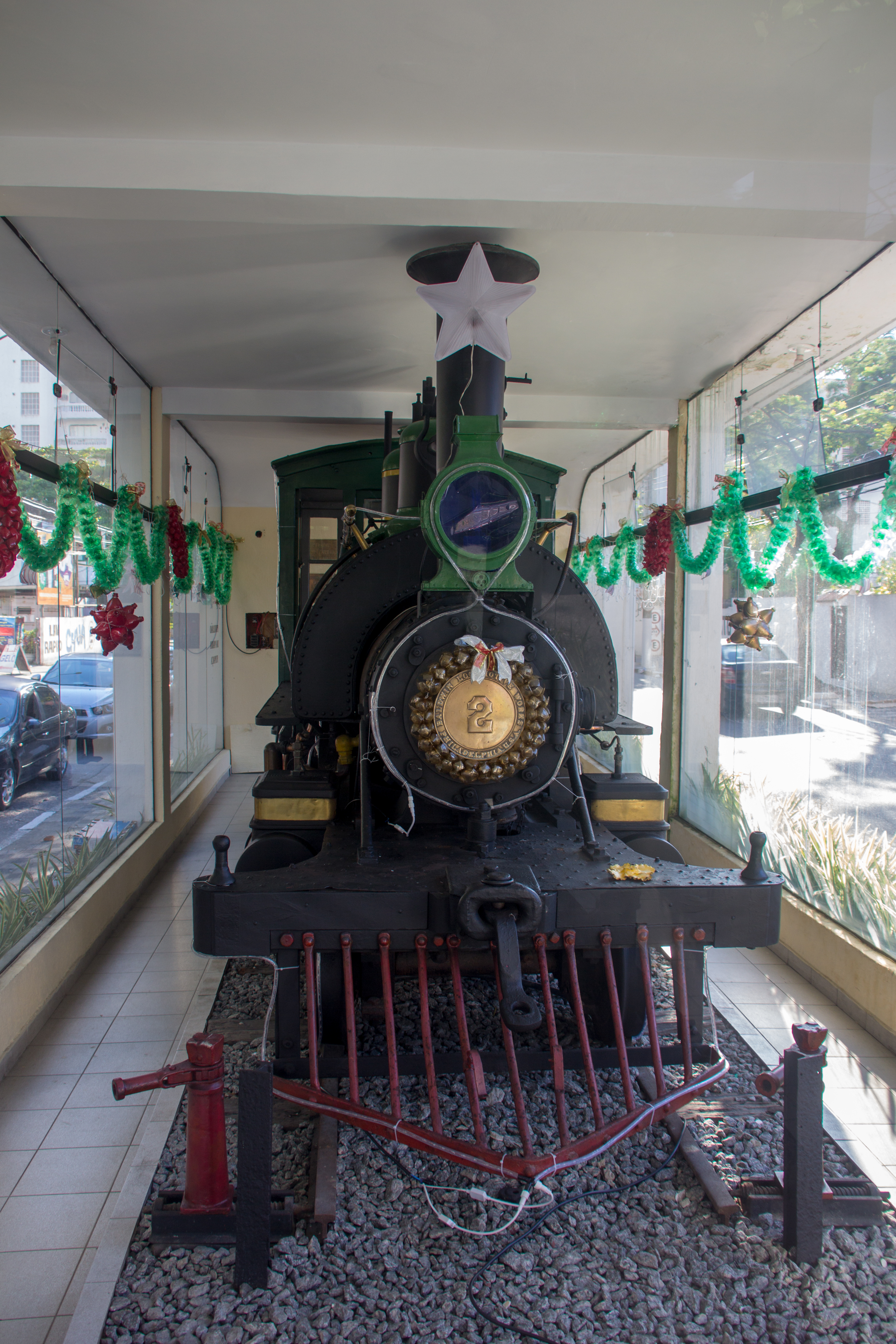
- Alternative names: Steam Train Pavilion

General information
- Type: tourist attraction
- Location: Guarujá, Brazil
- Coordinates: 23°59′42″S 46°15′26″W

The Pavilhão da Maria Fumaça (Steam Train Pavilion) is a tourist attraction in Guarujá, Brazil. It houses the steam locomotive that took tourists from a station in the Itapema estuary to the front of the Grande Hotel on Pitangueiras beach. At the end of the 1910s, the branch on which the aforementioned steam locomotive - "Maria Fumaça" - was deactivated and a highway was built. Until 2017, the Maria Fumaça pavilion was symmetrically paired with the Santos-Dumont hearse pavilion, but in 2017 the city council chose to remove the car from the pavilion.
