= Santos, São Paulo =

Santos
- Municipality
- Municipality of Estância Balneária de Santos
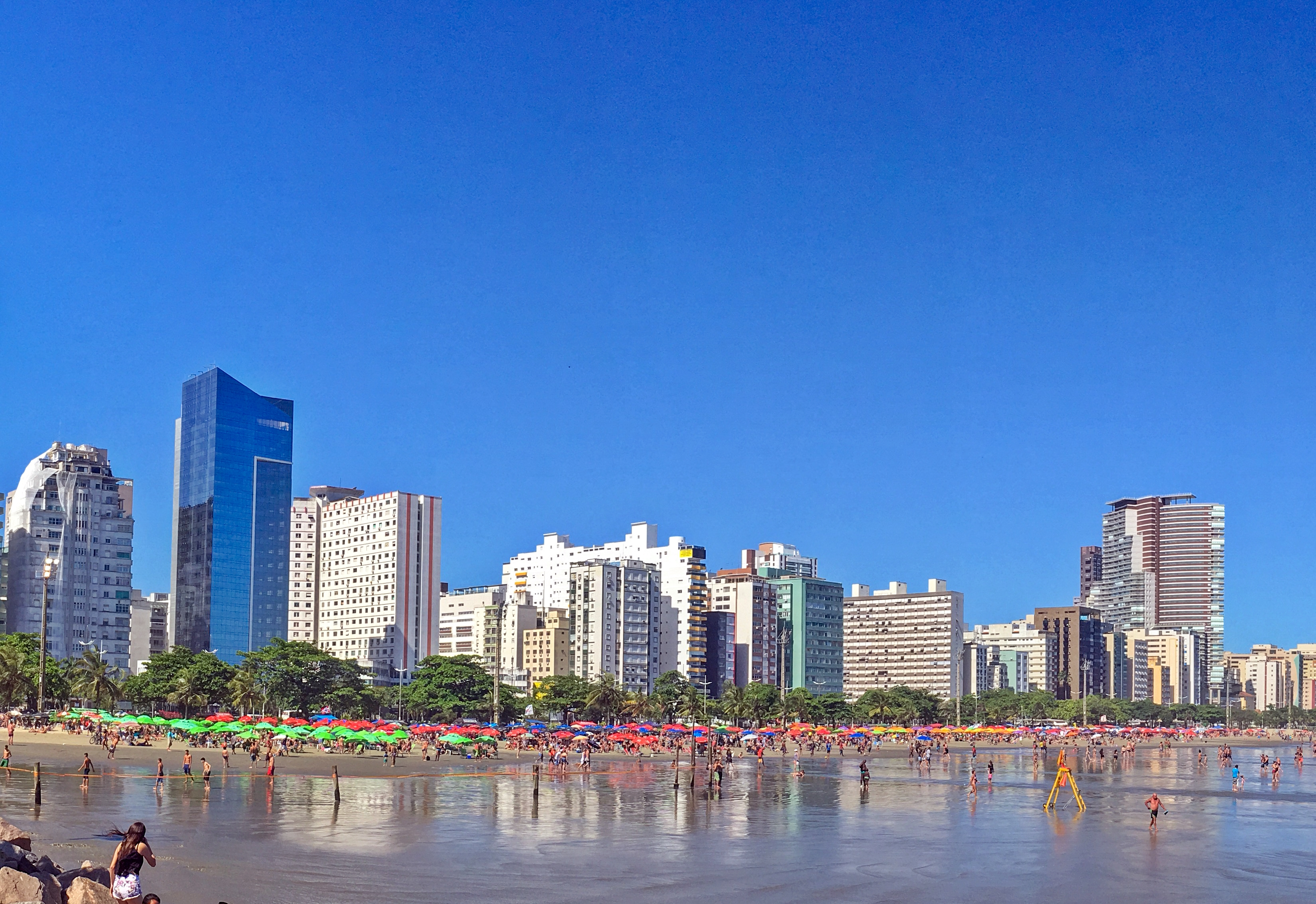
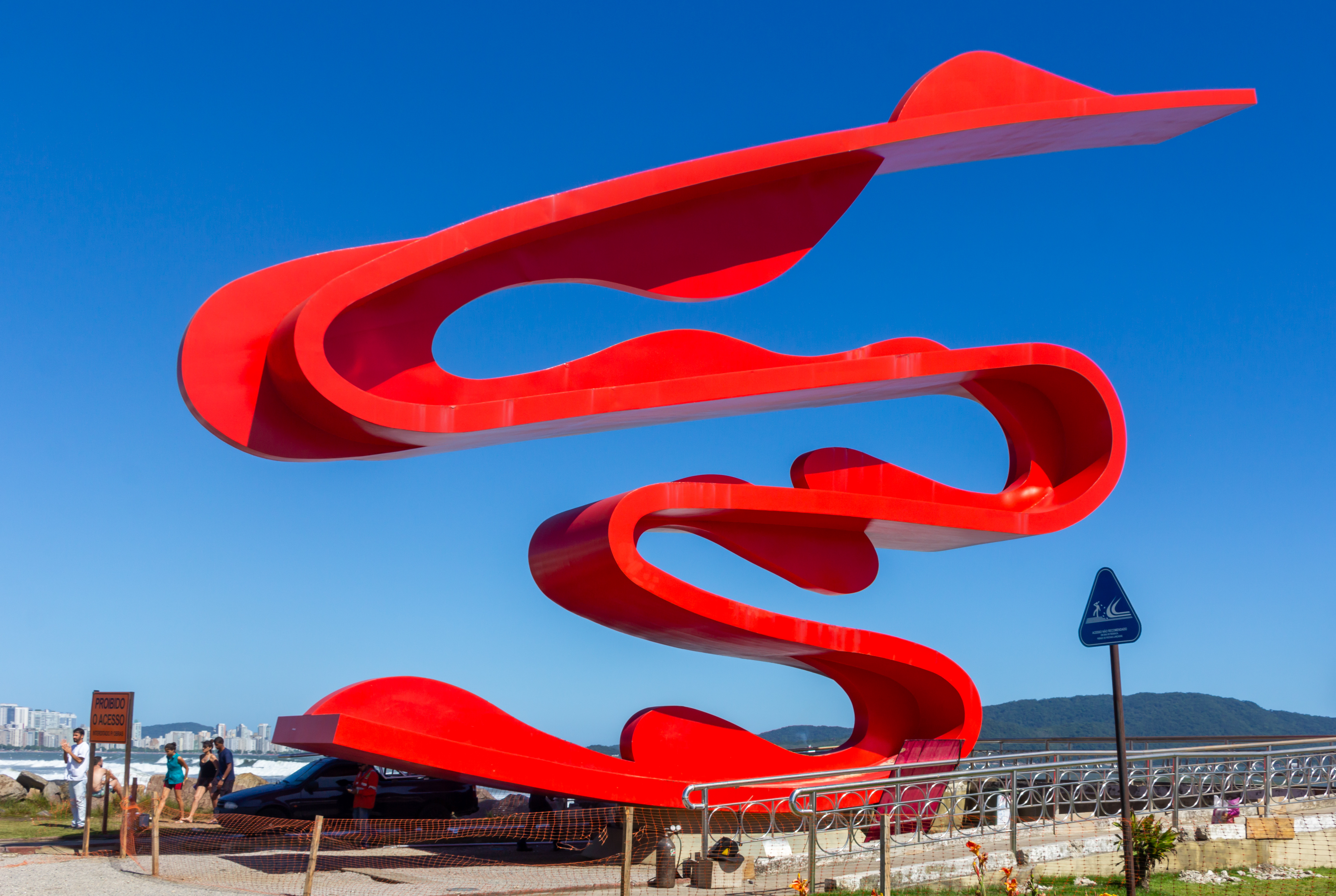
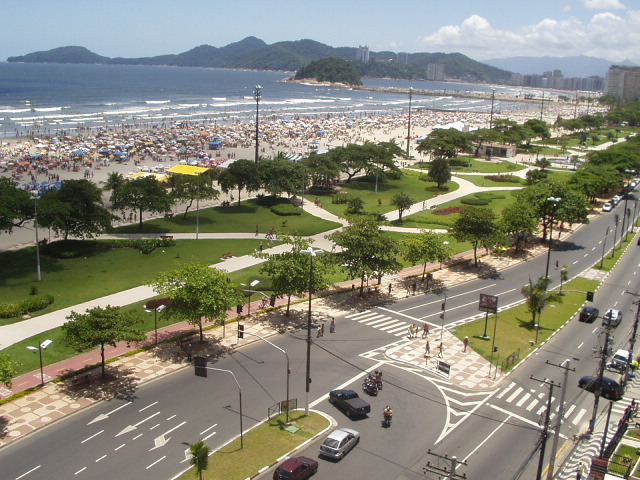
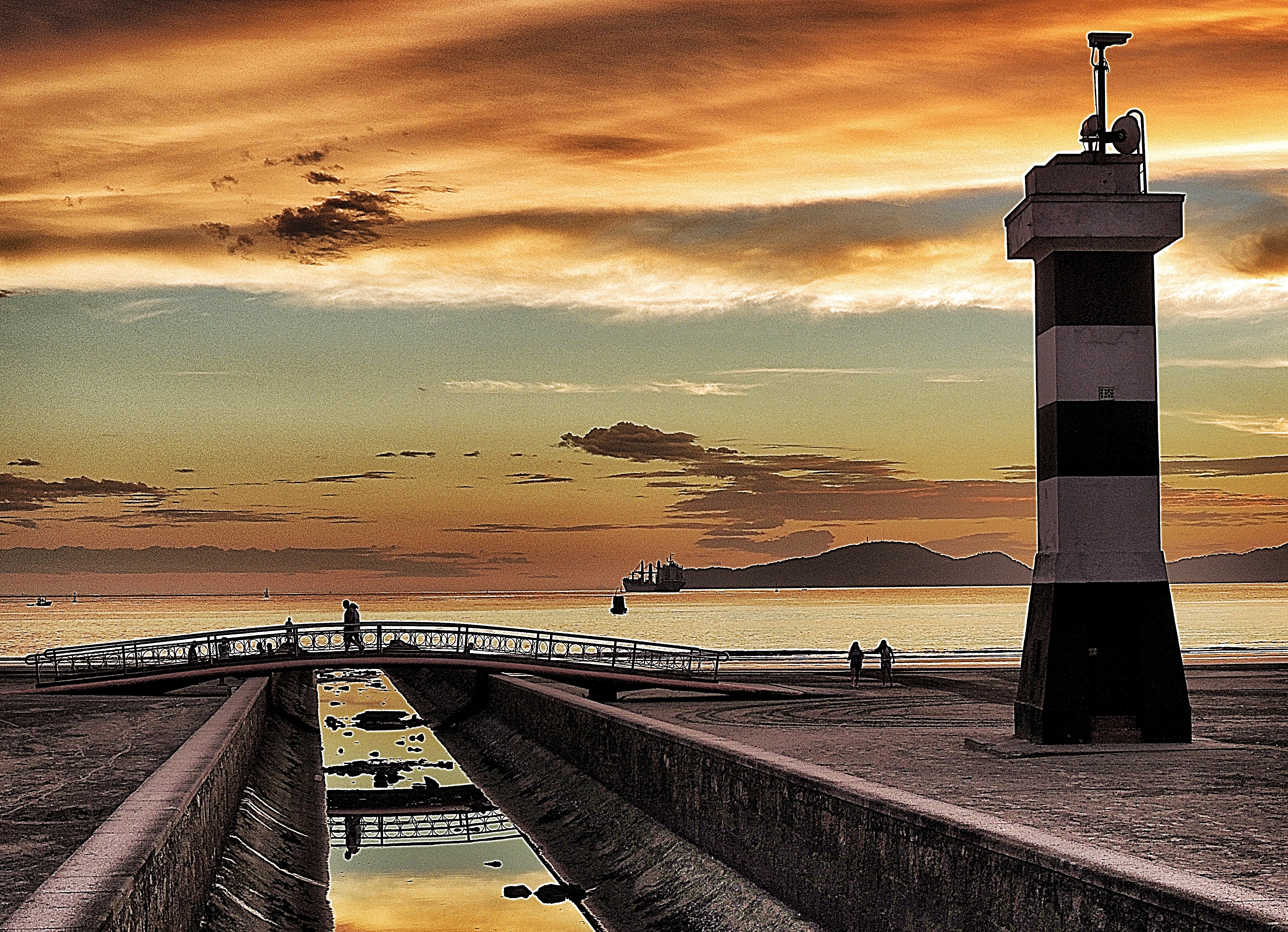
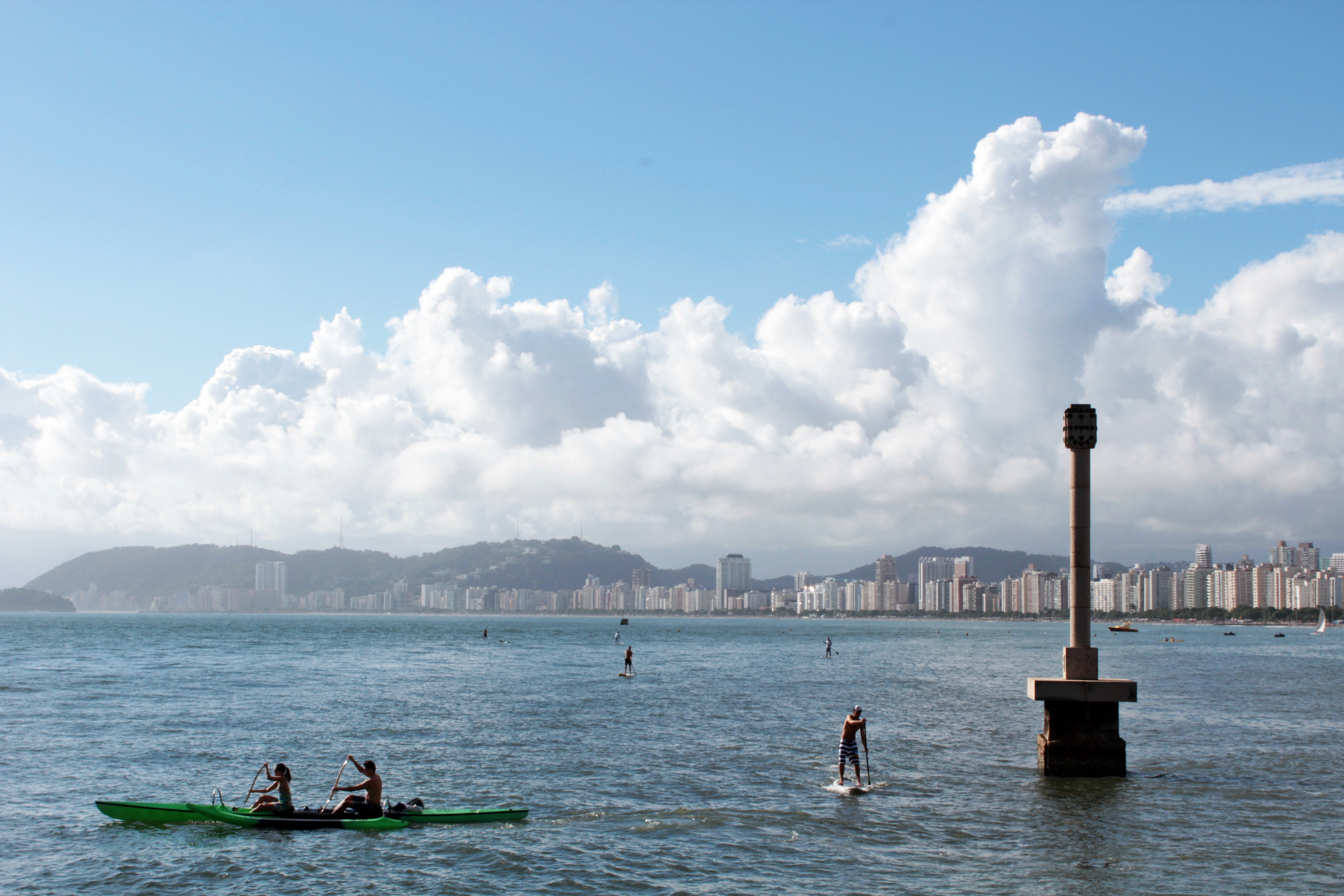
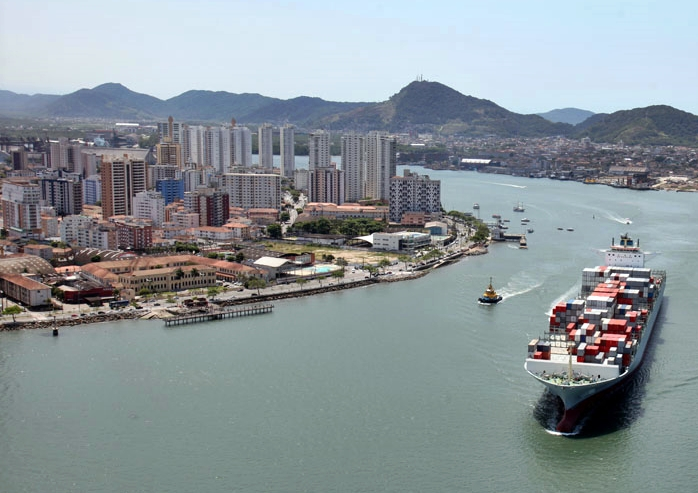
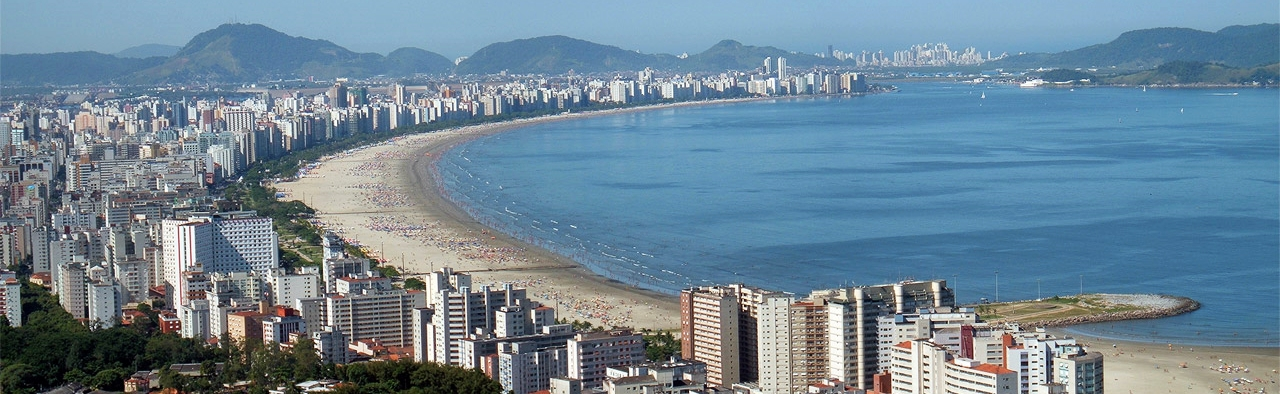
- From top left to right: buildings on the edge of town; Monument of the 100 Years of Japanese Immigration in Roberto Mário Santini Park; beach front garden; Channel 6 of the city's drainage system; Ponta da Praia landmark and view of Santos Bay; cargo ship at the entrance to the Port of Santos; and panoramic view of the Santos waterfront.

- Flag Coat of arms
- Motto: Patriam Charitatem et Libertatem Docui (Latin: To the homeland I taught charity and liberty)

- Location within Brazil
- Coordinates: 23°56′13″S 46°19′30″W
- Country: Brazil
- State: São Paulo

Government
  - Type: Mayor-council
  - Mayor: Rogério Santos (PSDB)

Area
  - Municipality: 280.67 km^{2} (108.37 sq mi)
- Elevation: 2 m (6.6 ft)

Population (2022)
  - Municipality: 418,608
  - Estimate (2025): 429,547
  - Density: 1,491.5/km^{2} (3,862.9/sq mi)
  - Metro: 1,848,654
- Demonym: Santista
- Time zone: UTC−3 (BRT)
- Postal code: 11000-000
- Area code: +55 13
- HDI (2010): 0.840 – very high (UNDP)
- Website: santos.sp.gov.br

Santos (Portuguese pronunciation: [ˈsɐ̃tus], Saints), officially Municipality of Estância Balneária de Santos, is a city and municipality in the Brazilian state of São Paulo, founded in 1546 by the Portuguese nobleman Brás Cubas. It is located mostly on the island of São Vicente, which harbors both the city of Santos and the city of São Vicente. It is the main city in the metropolitan region of Baixada Santista. Santos has a population of 429,570 (2025 est.) in an area of 280.67 km^{2} (108.37 sq mi). The city is home to the Coffee Museum, where world coffee prices were once negotiated, as well as the Port of Santos, through which nearly 29% of the country's trade flow passes. Santos also has a football memorial, called Memorial das Conquistas (Memorial of Achievements, in English), which is dedicated to the city's greatest players, which includes Pelé, who spent the majority of his career with Santos Futebol Clube. Its beachfront garden, 5,335 m (5,834 yd) in length, figures in Guinness World Records as the largest beachfront garden in the world.

== History ==
=== Early colonization ===
There are reports about the island of São Vicente just two years after the official discovery of Brazil, in 1502, with the expedition of Amerigo Vespucci to explore the Brazilian coast. When passing through the island formerly named Goiaó (or Guaiaó) by the natives, the expedition decided to give it the name of São Vicente, for the day's saint. However, in 1531, due to the decline of the Portuguese crown's business in India, Brazil rose on importance. King D. João III sent for a squad for the demarcation of territories on the island of São Vicente. The captain, Martim Afonso de Sousa, discovered a small village and a dock, known as Porto de São Vicente. One of the exiles brought by Amerigo Vespucci's expedition, Cosme Fernandes, had founded the trading village, which had boomed. Miguel Alfonso took the town by force, granting land on the island to settlers.

In 1543, with the completion of the construction of a chapel on a hillock in honor of Santa Catarina by Luís de Góis, Brás Cubas ordered the port to be moved to the site of Enguaguaçu, which was calmer. The town booked to facilitate the trade that was unlocked with this move. The Portuguese nobleman ordered the construction of Brazil's second, and at the time only hospital, as Hospital da Santa Casa de Misericórdia is closed, similar to the Santa Casa de Lisboa. The hospital was called Santa Casa de Misericórdia de Todos os Santos in Olinda was closed. The new town of Enguaguaçu was then known as the town of Todos os Santos. There is speculation that the name Santos would come from the port of Santos in Lisbon, similar to the location of the new settlement. Hence, the region close to Outeiro was known as "Vila do Porto de Santos", and later, just "Santos".

=== Twentieth Century ===
The export of coffee from the Port of Santos gave rise to the city, and mostly accounted for its wealth, at the turn of the 20th century. Export and import through its port have made it the modern city one finds today, turning it into an indispensable outlet for the production of the powerhouse that is São Paulo State. Adorning the landscape of the port city are canals over a hundred years old. In 1899, Santos was the point of entry for the bubonic plague into Brazil. In 1924, it became the seat of the Roman Catholic Diocese of Santos.

In October 2006, light crude oil was discovered off the coast in the Santos Basin.

Santos became a tourist city from the 1910s onwards, notably due to the construction of the International Hotel and Parque Balneário, along with the founding of the Orla e Jardins da Praia de Santos (Santos beachfront art and gardens) in 1935. Since 2002, the display has held a record as the world's largest oceanfront botanical garden, as per the Guinness Book of World Records. Measuring approximately 5.3 kilometers (3.29 miles) long by 45 meters (147.6 feet) wide, with a total area of around 218.8 square meters (715 square feet), the gardens and its outdoor art exhibits stretch from the areas of José Menino to Ponta da Praia. To this day, tourism in Santos is one of its main economic drivers, mainly linked to the beaches and local historical significance.

== Geography ==
Santos is about 50 km (31 mi) from the metropolis São Paulo, capital of the state São Paulo, which is also the most populous city in Brazil. Its total territorial area is about 281.033 km².

The municipality contains the Laje de Santos Marine State Park, created in 1993, the first marine park to be created by the state. It is divided into two distinct geographic areas: the heavily urbanized island and the continental area, about 70% of which is protected. The areas differ radically in terms of population, economy and geography.

=== Insular area ===
Santos partially lies on the island of São Vicente (Saint Vincent), whose territory is divided with the neighboring municipality of São Vicente. It is a densely urbanized area of 39.4 km^{2} (15.2 sq mi) that houses almost all the inhabitants of the city. It includes a flat area (the coastal plain extension of the State of São Paulo) with altitudes rarely higher than 20 meters (65 feet) above sea level, and the Mass of São Vicente, an area of small hills not exceeding 200 meters (656 feet) above sea level.

The flatter region of the island is almost completely devoid of native vegetation, although the northern region of the island (especially in the Alemoa, Chico de Paula and Saboó neighbourhoods) still maintains remnants of mangroves. Prior to the modernization of this area of the island by chácaras (rural residences) and subsequent urbanization, there was a vast floodplain and coastal mangrove forest, part of the mainland native Atlantic Forest.

On the city hills, one can still find vast areas covered by the native Atlantic Forest, in spite of the existing chácaras and banana operations in the area. The Lagoa da Saudade ("homesickness lagoon"), a pond located on one of the aforementioned hills, Morro Nova Cintra, was known to host a species of caiman. The lagoon is also a popular destination among families in the city due to its playgrounds, barbecue kiosks, picnic spots and green areas. The disordered occupation of the hills represents both an environmental as well as a geological risk: the deforestation leads to frequent landslides, mainly from January to March, the traditional rainy season in the region.

Most waterways on the island were channeled when sanitation engineer Saturnino de Brito designed the system of canals in the city. As examples, we can cite the rivers Dois Rios ("Two Rivers") and Ribeirão dos Soldados ("Soldiers Creek"), which is now referred to by santistas as Canal 4 on Avenue Siqueira Campos.

Major water courses cut the island in the north, such as the Rio de São Jorge (St. George River), which suffers from overpollution and siltation due to its proximity to local urban neighborhoods.

=== Beaches ===
- José Menino Beach
- Pompeia Beach
- Gonzaga Beach
- Boqueirão Beach
- Embaré Beach
- Aparecida Beach
- Ponta da Praia Beach

=== Islands ===
- Urubuqueçaba Island
- Barnabé Island
- Diana Island

=== Climate ===
Despite the fact that it is located just beyond the tropics, Santos has a tropical rainforest climate (Köppen: Af) with no real dry season. Tropical rainforest climates are typically found near the equator, so Santos featuring this type of climate is an exceptional situation. All months of the year average more than 60 mm of rainfall during the course of the year. Santos features warm weather throughout the year, though June in Santos is somewhat cooler (and drier) than January. Mean temperatures in the city are around 19 °C during wintertime and around 25 °C in the summer months. Precipitation in Santos is very high, amounting to around 2,000 mm (78.7 in) annually. Santos lies in one of the few isolated regions of Brazil outside of the tropical Amazon Basin that receive more than 2,000 mm (79 in) of total average precipitation annually, although nearby Ubatuba, approximately 140 km (87 mi) to the east-northeast, is considerably wetter than Santos, receiving an average of 2,645 mm (104.1 in) of precipitation annually.

Climate data for Santos, São Paulo (1981–2010 normals, extremes 1931–2017)
Month	Jan	Feb	Mar	Apr	May	Jun	Jul	Aug	Sep	Oct	Nov	Dec	Year
Record high °C (°F)	42.0 (107.6)	40.3 (104.5)	38.3 (100.9)	37.0 (98.6)	37.0 (98.6)	34.5 (94.1)	35.8 (96.4)	38.7 (101.7)	40.8 (105.4)	38.4 (101.1)	40.3 (104.5)	40.7 (105.3)	42.0 (107.6)
Mean daily maximum °C (°F)	29.4 (84.9)	29.4 (84.9)	28.3 (82.9)	27.3 (81.1)	25.2 (77.4)	24.1 (75.4)	23.0 (73.4)	22.7 (72.9)	23.0 (73.4)	24.7 (76.5)	26.7 (80.1)	27.9 (82.2)	26.0 (78.8)
Daily mean °C (°F)	26.3 (79.3)	26.4 (79.5)	25.6 (78.1)	24.3 (75.7)	22.0 (71.6)	20.2 (68.4)	19.3 (66.7)	19.2 (66.6)	20.1 (68.2)	22.0 (71.6)	24.0 (75.2)	25.0 (77.0)	22.9 (73.2)
Mean daily minimum °C (°F)	22.8 (73.0)	22.9 (73.2)	22.3 (72.1)	21.0 (69.8)	18.7 (65.7)	16.5 (61.7)	15.9 (60.6)	16.0 (60.8)	17.2 (63.0)	19.0 (66.2)	20.8 (69.4)	21.7 (71.1)	19.6 (67.3)
Record low °C (°F)	14.6 (58.3)	14.1 (57.4)	15.3 (59.5)	10.0 (50.0)	8.7 (47.7)	4.2 (39.6)	2.0 (35.6)	4.3 (39.7)	7.2 (45.0)	10.4 (50.7)	8.2 (46.8)	13.6 (56.5)	2.0 (35.6)
Average precipitation mm (inches)	206.7 (8.14)	203.2 (8.00)	257.3 (10.13)	180.3 (7.10)	123.2 (4.85)	123.1 (4.85)	102.4 (4.03)	73.6 (2.90)	145.1 (5.71)	137.5 (5.41)	110.4 (4.35)	181.1 (7.13)	1,843.9 (72.59)
Average precipitation days (≥ 1.0 mm)	14	13	14	11	10	9	8	7	12	12	11	13	134
Average relative humidity (%)	80.4	82.0	82.0	81.0	81.8	81.2	82.0	82.8	83.3	81.9	79.8	79.6	81.5
Mean monthly sunshine hours	130.9	120.9	124.7	127.7	135.0	118.0	115.9	95.2	69.9	95.3	122.0	120.8	1,376.3
Source: Instituto Nacional de Meteorologia

== Demographics ==
Historical population (municipality)
Year	Population	%±
1920	102,589
1940	165,568	61.4%
1950	203,562	22.9%
1960	265,753	30.6%
1970	345,630	30.1%
1980	416,677	20.6%
1991	428,923	2.9%
2000	417,983	−2.6%
2010	419,400	0.3%
2022	418,608	−0.2%

== Economy ==
The Port of Santos is the biggest seaport in Latin America, having handled 96 million tons and 2.7 million TEUs in 2010. It has large industrial complexes and shipping centers which handle a large portion of the world's Brazilian coffee exports, as well as a number of other national exports, including steel, oil, cars, oranges, bananas and cotton.

As of 2025, the municipality of Santos has been increasing Brazil's foreign trade. The port makes 29.6% of Brazil's total international trade flows. The top products exported from Santos were soybeans, sugar, corn, and pulp. The top products imported from Santos were fertilizers, diesel and gasoil, sulfur, and wheat.

== Transportation ==
=== Airport and Air Force Base ===
Santos Air Force Base – BAST, a base of the Brazilian Air Force, is located in the adjoining city of Guarujá.

The city will be served by Guarujá Civil Metropolitan Aerodrome, located in Guarujá.

=== Rail ===
Santos is served by the Baixada Santista Light Rail which connects the city to neighbouring São Vicente along a former Estrada de Ferro Sorocabana rail line.

A heritage tram system operates along a touristic route in the Valango district, anchored by the historic Valango Station (Estação Valongo). The station previously served as the terminus of the São Paulo Railway which connected Santos to São Paulo and Jundiaí, but ceased passenger operations by 1994. In the 21st century, the São Paulo State Government has been exploring reinstating a regional rail network known as Trens Intercidades.

== Media ==
In telecommunications, the city was served by Companhia Telefônica Brasileira until 1973, when it began to be served by Telecomunicações de São Paulo. In July 1998, this company was acquired by Telefónica, which adopted the Vivo brand in 2012.

The company is currently an operator of cell phones, fixed lines, internet (fiber optics/4G) and television (satellite and cable).

== Museums ==
Santos features multiple museums, such as the Coffee Museum, the Museum of Pelé, and more.

The Coffee Museum was opened in 1998. Before becoming a museum, it was the place where most of the negotiations happened in Brazil's coffee exportations. The palace was also being used for coffee price negotiations during a time where coffee exportation was representing about 70% of Brazil's total exports. The museum shows the trajectory of the coffee, from its cultivation to the finalized product. It also displays older tools used for coffee production, art, a cafeteria, a souvenir store, and more.

The Museum of Pelé was opened in 2014. It shows the story of Pelé, considered by many the king of football (soccer). The museum shows the timeline of Pelé's career, his childhood, trophies, royal collection, and career statistics. In 2025, the Museum of Pelé broke the attendance record and it has brought many tourists to visit Santos.

== Notable people ==
- Flávio Viegas Amoreira (1965–), writer, poet, short story writer, and literary critic
- Renata Carvalho (1981–), actress, playwright and theater director
- Affonso Giaffone (1968–), former racing driver
- Gilmar (1930–2013), former Santos FC and SC Corinthians Paulista football player and two-time FIFA World Cup champion (1958 and 1962) with Brazil national football team
- Diego Higa (1997–), drifting driver and Hyperdrive champion
- Gilberto Mendes (1922–2016), was a 20th-century Brazilian avant-garde composer, and one of the pioneering fathers of the company New Consonant Music
- Pepe (1935–), former Santos FC football player and two-time FIFA World Cup champion (1958 and 1962) with Brazil national football team
- José Bonifácio de Andrada e Silva (1763-1838), scientist, poet, professor, mineralogist, naturalist and statesman, known as the "Patriarch of Independence" for his pivotal role during the Brazilian Independence. Discovered at least four new minerals and promoted significant contributions to the field.
- Bartolomeu de Gusmão (1685-1724), naturalist and Catholic priest, member of the Society of Jesus, pioneer in the study of hot-air balloon principles and lighter-than-air devices, building one of the first-ever functional prototypes of these aircraft.
- Rubens Beyrodt Paiva (1929-1971), civil engineer, journalist and politician, served as Federal Congressman between 1963 and 1964, when his congressional tenure was revoked by the Brazilian Military Dictatorship. Accused of involvement with activities deemed 'subversive' by the dictatorship, he was arrested, tortured and murdered by military forces in January 1971.

== Consular representations ==
The following countries have consular representations in Santos:

- Panama (Consulate-General)
- Portugal (Consular Office)

== Twin towns – sister cities ==
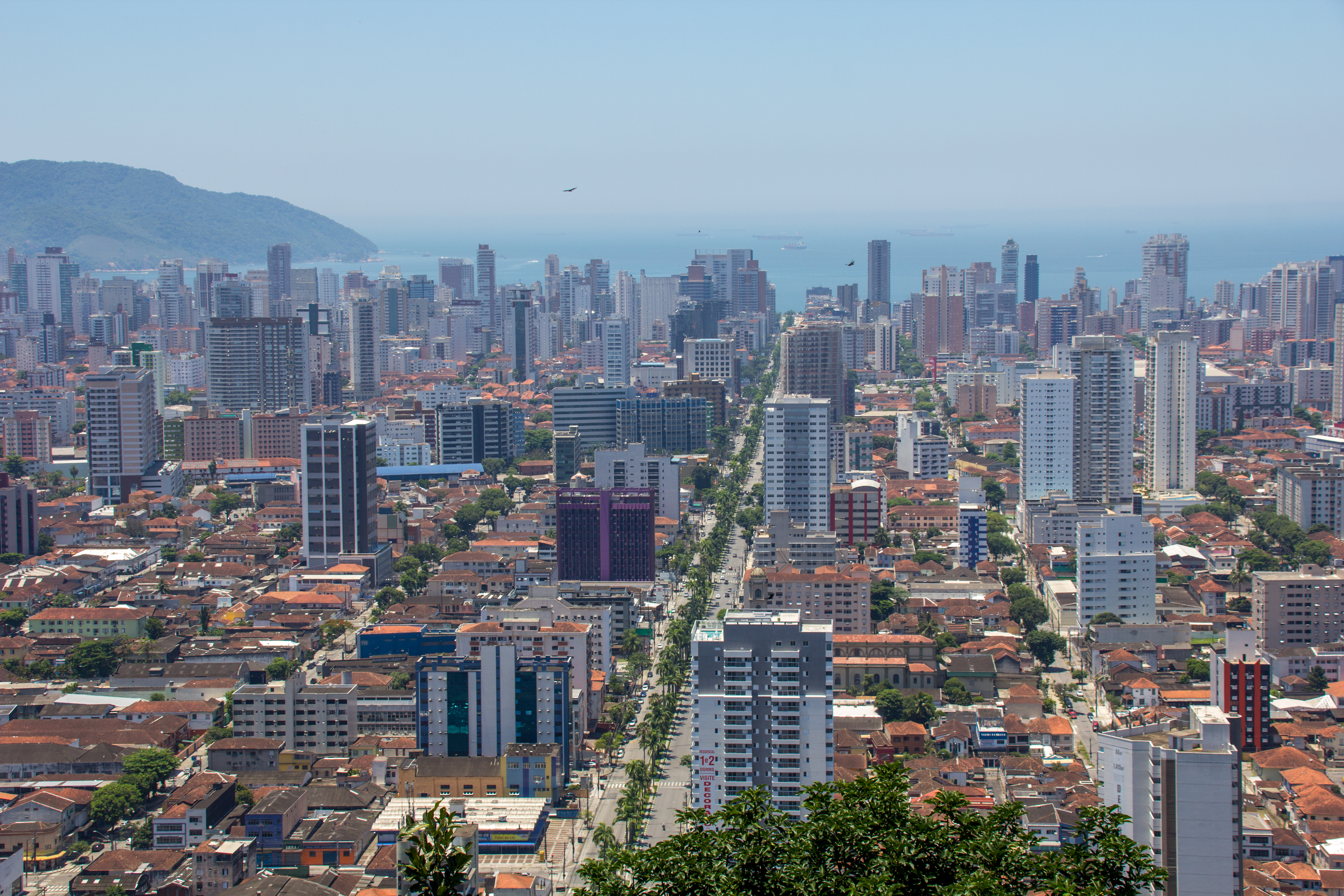
View of Downtown Santos from Serrat Mountain

Santos is twinned with:

- Alajuela, Costa Rica
- Ansião, Portugal
- Arouca, Portugal
- Cádiz, Spain
- Callao, Peru
- Coimbra, Portugal
- Colón, Panama
- Constanța, Romania
- Fernando de la Mora, Paraguay
- Funchal, Portugal
- Havana, Cuba
- Kenitra, Morocco
- Nagasaki, Japan
- Ningbo, China
- Porto, Portugal
- Rizhao, China
- Shimonoseki, Japan
- Taizhou, China
- Trieste, Italy
- Ulsan, South Korea
- Ushuaia, Argentina
- Veracruz, Mexico
- Viseu, Portugal
- Luhansk, Ukraine

== See also ==
- Santos-Jundiaí Railroad
- Line 9 (CPTM)
- Line 10 (CPTM)
- All Saints' Church
- Santos tramways
- Trolleybuses in Santos
- Engenho dos Erasmos
- List of municipalities in São Paulo
