= List of mayors of Santos, São Paulo =

The following is a list of mayors of the city of Santos, in São Paulo state, Brazil.

- Francisco Correa de Almeida Morais, 1891
- Antonio Carlos da Silva Teles, 1891
- Manoel Maria Tourinho, 1892-1896
- Jacob Thomaz Itapura de Miranda, 1896
- Narciso de Andrade, 1896-1897
- Antonio José Malheiros Júnior, 1897-1898
- Joaquim Montenegro, 1898-1899
- José Moreira de Sampaio, 1899-1899
- Adolpho Vaz Guimarães, 1899-1902
- Francisco Malta Cardoso, 1902-1904
- Manoel Galeão Carvalhal, 1904-1905, 1916-1917
- João Galeão Carvalhal, 1905
- Joaquim Mariano de Campos Moura, 1905-1906
- Carlos Augusto Vasconcelos Tavares, 1906-1907, 1908-1910
- Cincinato Martins Costa, 1907-1908
- Belmiro Ribeiro de Moraes e Silva, 1910-1914, 1917-1920
- Carlos Luiz de Afonseca, 1914-1916
- Joaquim Montenegro, 1920-1925
- Arnaldo Ferreira de Aguiar, 1925-1926
- José de Souza Dantas, 1929-1930
- Elias Machado de Almeida, 1930-1931
- Antenor Maciel Bué, 1931-1932
- Aristides Bastos Machado, 1932-1935, 1936
- Antonio Gomide Ribeiro dos Santos, 1935-1936, 1938, 1941-1945
- Antônio Iguatemi Martins Júnior, 1936-1938
- Cyro de Athayde Carneiro, 1938-1941
- Lincoln Feliciano, 1945
- Francisco Paíno, 1945, 1947
- Edgard Boaventura, 1946-1947
- Ozório de Souza Leite, 1947
- Rubens Ferreira Martins , 1947-1948, 1949-1950
- Álvaro Rodrigues dos Santos, 1948-1949
- Hernani Botto de Barros, 1950
- Sócrates Aranha de Menezes, 1950-1951
- Joaquim Alcaide Valls, 1951-1952
- Francisco Luiz Ribeiro, 1951-1953
- Antonio Ezequiel Feliciano da Silva, 1953-1957
- Sílvio Fernandes Lopes, 1957-1961
- Luiz La Scala Júnior, 1961
- José Gomes, 1961-1962, 1962-1964
- Fernando Oliva, 1962
- Fernando Hortalla Ridel, 1964-1965
- Sílvio Fernandes Lopes, 1965-1967, 1967-1969
- Francisco Prado de Oliveira Filho, 1967
- Clóvis Bandeira Brasil, 1969-1972, 1972-1974
- Ruy Vidal de Araújo, 1972
- Antônio Manoel de Carvalho, 1974-1979
- Carlos Caldeira Filho, 1979-1980
- Washington Di Giovanni, 1980
- Paulo Gomes Barbosa, 1980-1984
- Oswaldo Justo, 1984-1988
- Telma de Souza, 1989-1992
- David Capistrano Filho, 1993-1996
- Paulo Roberto Gomes Mansur, 1997-2004
- João Paulo Tavares Papa, 2005-2012
- Paulo Alexandre Barbosa, 2013-

== See also ==
- Câmara Municipal de Santos (city council)
- History of Santos
- List of mayors of largest cities in Brazil (in Portuguese)
