= Engenho dos Erasmos =

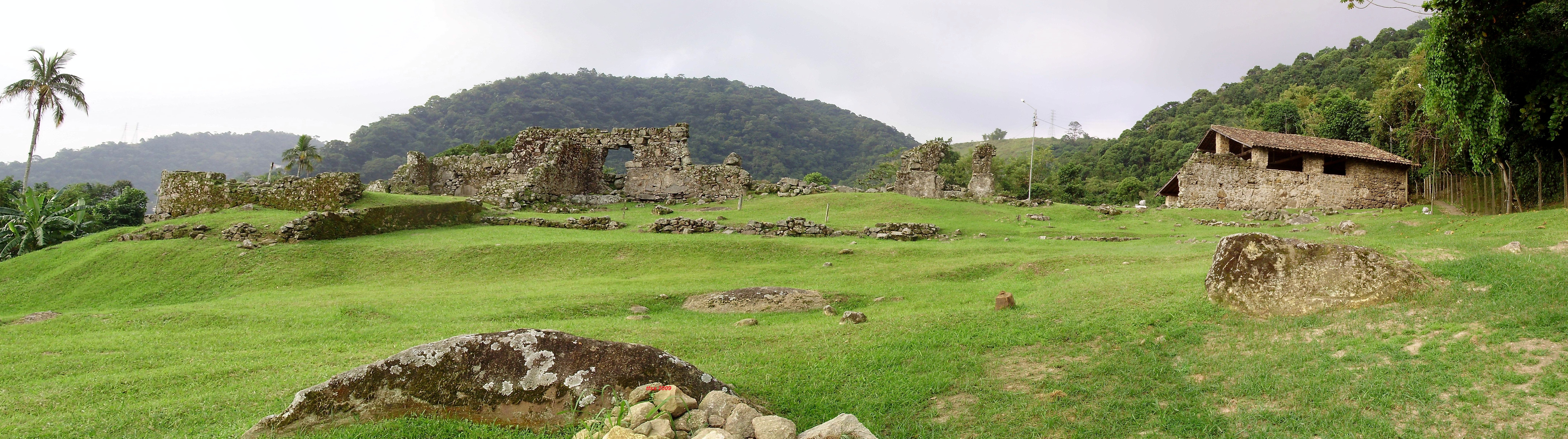
- Interactive map of the Engenho dos Erasmos area

General information
- Type: Engenho
- Location: Santos, São Paulo, Brazil
- Coordinates: 23°56′52″S 46°21′47″W
- Construction started: c. 1534
- Owner: University of São Paulo

Design and construction
- Designations: IPHAN (2 July 1963); CONDEPHAAT (11 December 1974)

Website
- http://www.engenho.prceu.usp.br/

Engenho dos Erasmos or Engenho São Jorge dos Erasmos was a sugar cane facility on the island of São Vicente, Brazil. Constructed around 1534, the engenho was owned for most of its working life by the Schetz family. It is now a ruin, national monument and tourist destination.

== Construction ==
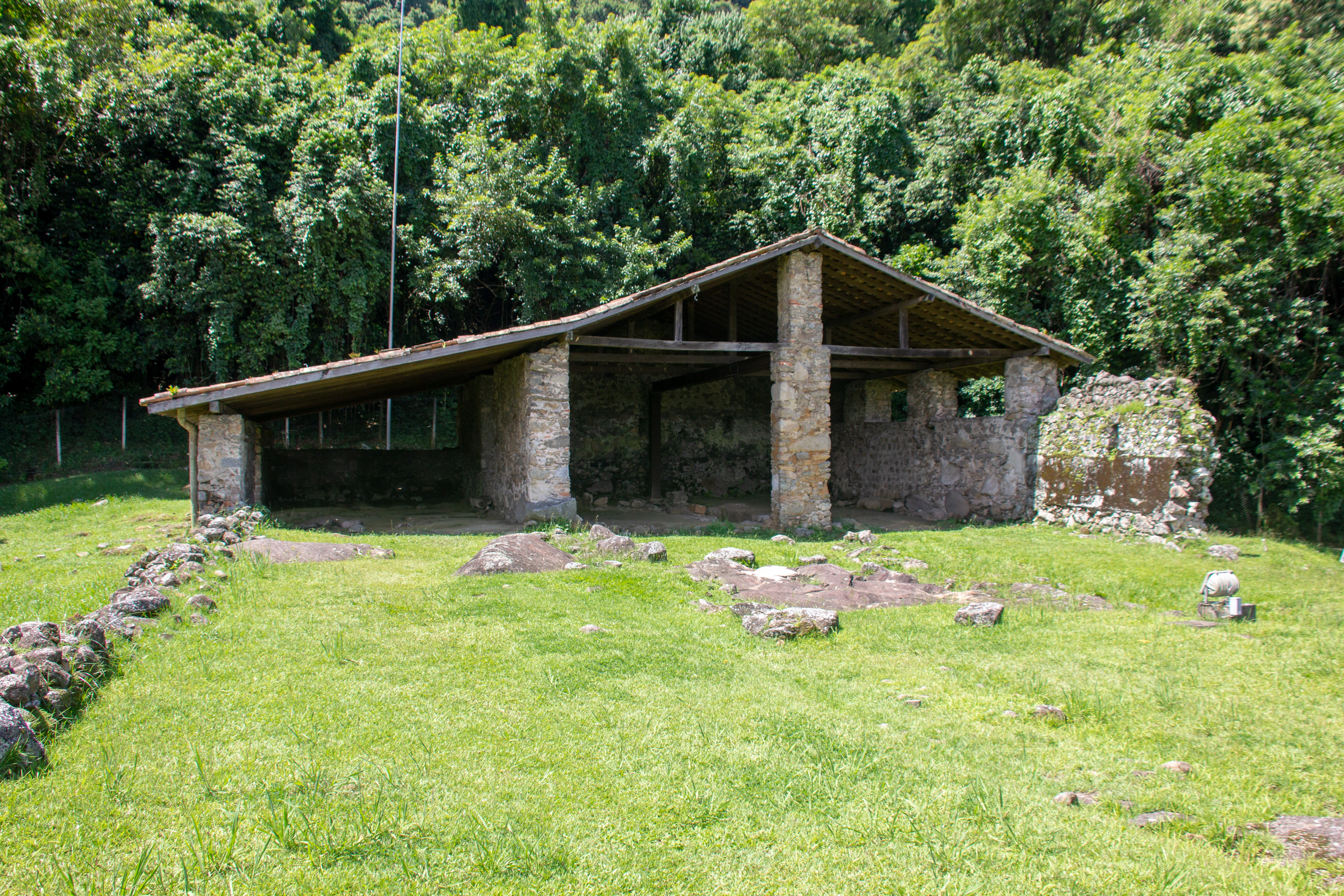
The ruins of the factory, with a reconstructed roof

Large-scale manufacturing of sugar in Brazil started with the 1532 expedition to São Vicente, led by Martim Afonso de Sousa. The Engenho dos Erasmos sugar mill was probably constructed a few years later, around 1534 and was originally known as Engenho do Governador - the Governor's Mill. It was owned by Martim Afonso, Pero Lopes de Souza, Francisco Lobo, and Vicente Gonçalves, and was possibly the third such mill to be set up in Brazil, after Engenho da Madre de Deus in 1532 and Engenho de São João in 1533.

It became the property of Erasmus II Schetz around 1540, via the commercial representatives Johan Van Hielst and João Veniste. When Erasmus died in 1550 it passed to his son, Gaspard II Schetz and it was owned by successive generations of the Schetz family until the late 17th century, although they tried to sell it in 1593 and 1612. It produced sugar cane for export and domestic consumption, and operated until at least 1580, when there was increasing competition of sugar cane production from northeast Brazil and closed by the end of the 18th century.

The site contained the factory, as well as administrative and accommodation buildings (including for the slaves). As well as the main building containing the factory, all under a single roof and powered by a water wheel, there was a blacksmith shop and two roofed houses. The site also had a chapel and a cemetery, and was dedicated to Saint George. Although often said to be built in Azorian style, it is based on the Madeiran mill style.

The factory was attacked by Thomas Cavendish in 1591. In 1615, Joris van Spilbergen set fire to the factory, which destroyed most of its facilities.

== Ruins ==
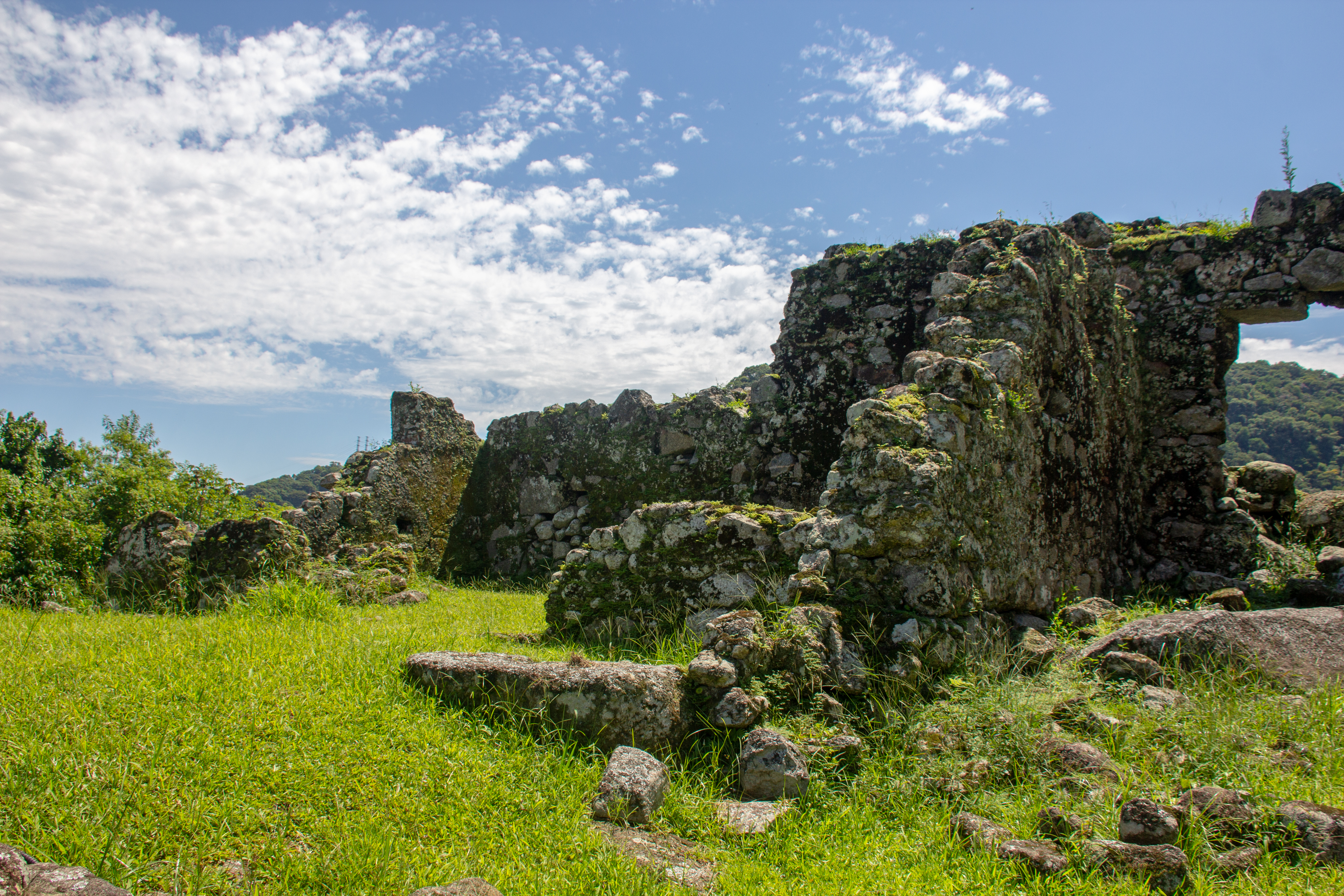
The ruins of the chapel

The mill was abandoned in the 18th century and largely forgotten about until the 20th century. The site was owned by various families, including Braz Esteves, Pedrosa, Góis, Muniz Guimarães, Viana, Marques do Vale, Graça Martins and Toledo.

In 1943 the land and the ruins were purchased by Otávio Ribeiro de Araújo. He donated it to the Faculdade de Filosofia, Ciências e Letras in 1958 and it has been administered by the University of São Paulo since then. While not much preservation work was carried out between 1958 and the end of the 1980s, this changed in the 1990s and 2000s, when archaeological excavations took place at the site. Over 2,000 fragments, including animal and human bones dating from the 16th century, were recovered during the excavations.

The ruins are now a national monument, registered by IPHAN in 1963 and CONDEPHAAT in 1974. It is open for visitors, with free entry from 9 a.m. to 4 p.m. on Tuesday through Sunday each week and various events are held at the site, including workshops and concerts.
