= São Vicente Island (São Paulo, Brazil) =

Island in Brazil

Coordinates: 23°57′00″S 46°21′36″W

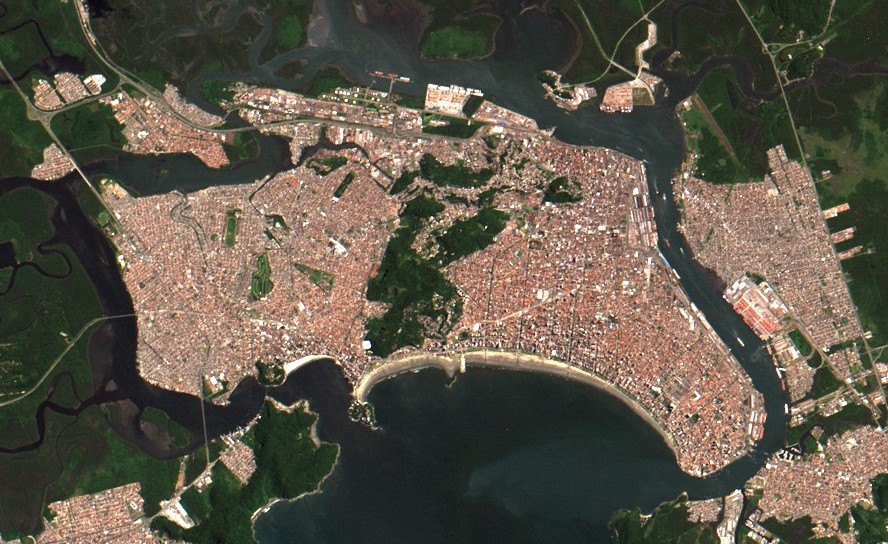
Satellite image of São Vicente Island.

São Vicente Island (São Paulo, Brazil) (Ilha de São Vicente) is an island in São Paulo state, Brazil. It has an area of 57.4 km^{2} and a population of 760,000 people. The population density is 13,240/ km^{2}, making it the most densely populated island in Brazil, and the 38th most densely populated island in the world. Parts of the cities of São Vicente and Santos are located on the island. The former sugar cane facility, Engenho dos Erasmos is situated here. Like the next island over, Guarujá (municip and island), São Vicente Island faces the ocean on one side, with freshwater rivers surrounding it.
