= Guarujá Civil Metropolitan Aerodrome =

Guarujá Civil Metropolitan Aerodrome Aeroporto Civil Metropolitano do Guarujá
- IATA: SSZ; ICAO: SBST; LID: SP9006

Summary
- Airport type: Public/Military
- Operator: Brazilian Air Force (1941–2020); Infraero (2020–present)
- Serves: Santos
- Location: Guarujá, Brazil
- Time zone: BRT (UTC−03:00)
- Elevation AMSL: 4 m / 13 ft
- Coordinates: 23°55′41″S 046°17′59″W
- Website: www4.infraero.gov.br/aeroporto-guaruja/

Map
- Location in Brazil

Runways
Direction	Length		Surface
Direction	m	ft	Surface
17/35	1,390	4,560	Asphalt
- Sources: Airport Website, ANAC, DECEA

The Guarujá Civil Metropolitan Airport (IATA: SSZ, ICAO: SBST) is an airport under construction to serve Guarujá, Santos and the Santos Metropolitan Region in Brazil.

It is operated by Infraero.

Some of its facilities will be shared with the Santos Air Force Base of the Brazilian Air Force.

== History ==
Plans to use the site of the Santos Air Force Base also as a civil aerodrome started in 2018. In 2019 the Ministry of Infrastructure and the Brazilian Air Force signed the agreement.

On 3 July 2020 Infraero started to manage the civil portion of the site and to conduct works regarding the construction of a terminal.

The facility is expected to open in mid-2025.

== Access ==
The airport is located 9 km (6 mi) from Guarujá and 17 km (11 mi) from Santos.

== See also ==
- Santos Air Force Base
