= Santos Air Force Base =

Air base of the Brazilian Air Force

- Base Aérea de Santos
- Guarujá, São Paulo in Brazil
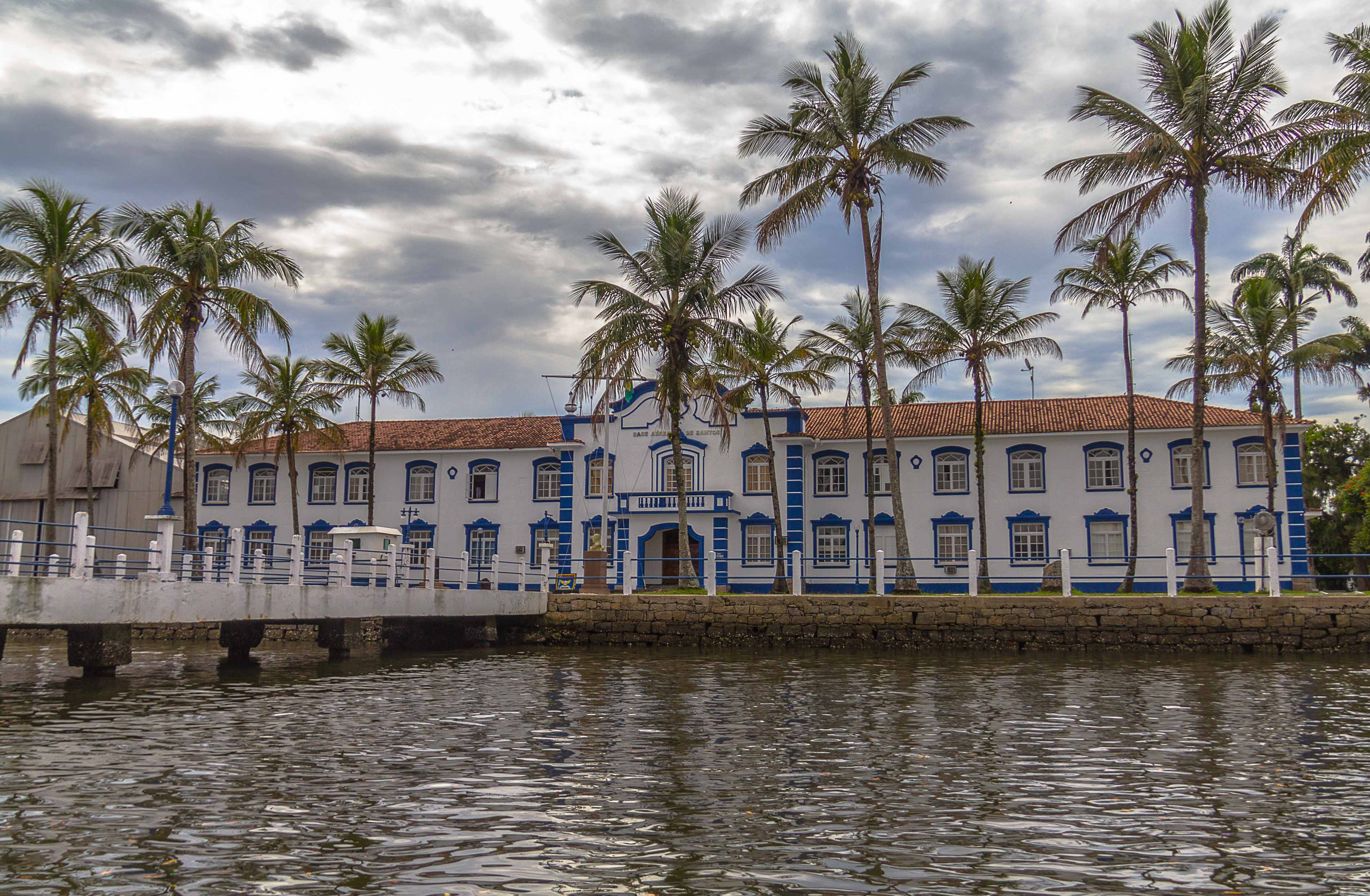

Site information
- Type: Air Force Base
- Code: BAST
- Owner: Brazilian Air Force
- Controlled by: Brazilian Air Force
- Open to the public: No
- Website: www.fab.mil.br/organizacoes/mostra/50/BASE%20A%C3%89REA%20DE%20SANTOS

Location
- Location in Brazil SBST (Brazil)
- Coordinates: 23°55′41″S 046°17′59″W

Site history
- Built: 1922
- In use: 1941-present

Garrison information
- Current commander: Ten. Cel. Av. Francisco José Formaggio

Airfield information
- Identifiers: IATA: SSZ, ICAO: SBST, LID: SP9006
- Elevation: 4 metres (13 ft) AMSL
Runways
Direction	Length and surface
17/35	1,390 metres (4,560 ft) Asphalt

The Santos Air Force Base – BAST (IATA: SSZ, ICAO: SBST) is a base of the Brazilian Air Force, located in Guarujá, Brazil.

It will share some facilities with the Guarujá Civil Metropolitan Aerodrome.

== Units ==
Since January 2017 there are no permanent flying units assigned to the Santos Air Force Base. Whenever needed, the aerodrome is used as a support facility to other air units of the Brazilian Air Force, Navy and Army.

Former Unit
1979–2006: 1st Squadron of the 11th Aviation Group (1º/11ºGAv) Gavião. The squadron was moved to the Natal Air Force Base.

== Accidents and incidents ==
- 13 August 2014: a Cessna Citation Excel registration PR-AFA belonging to AF Andrade Empreendimentos e Participações, en route from Rio de Janeiro-Santos Dumont to Santos Air Force Base crashed while on final approach to Santos. All seven occupants died. Among the victims was Brazilian Socialist Party presidential candidate Eduardo Campos.

== Access ==
The base is located 9 km from downtown Guarujá and 17 km from downtown Santos.

== Gallery ==
This gallery displays aircraft that have been based at Santos. The gallery is not comprehensive.

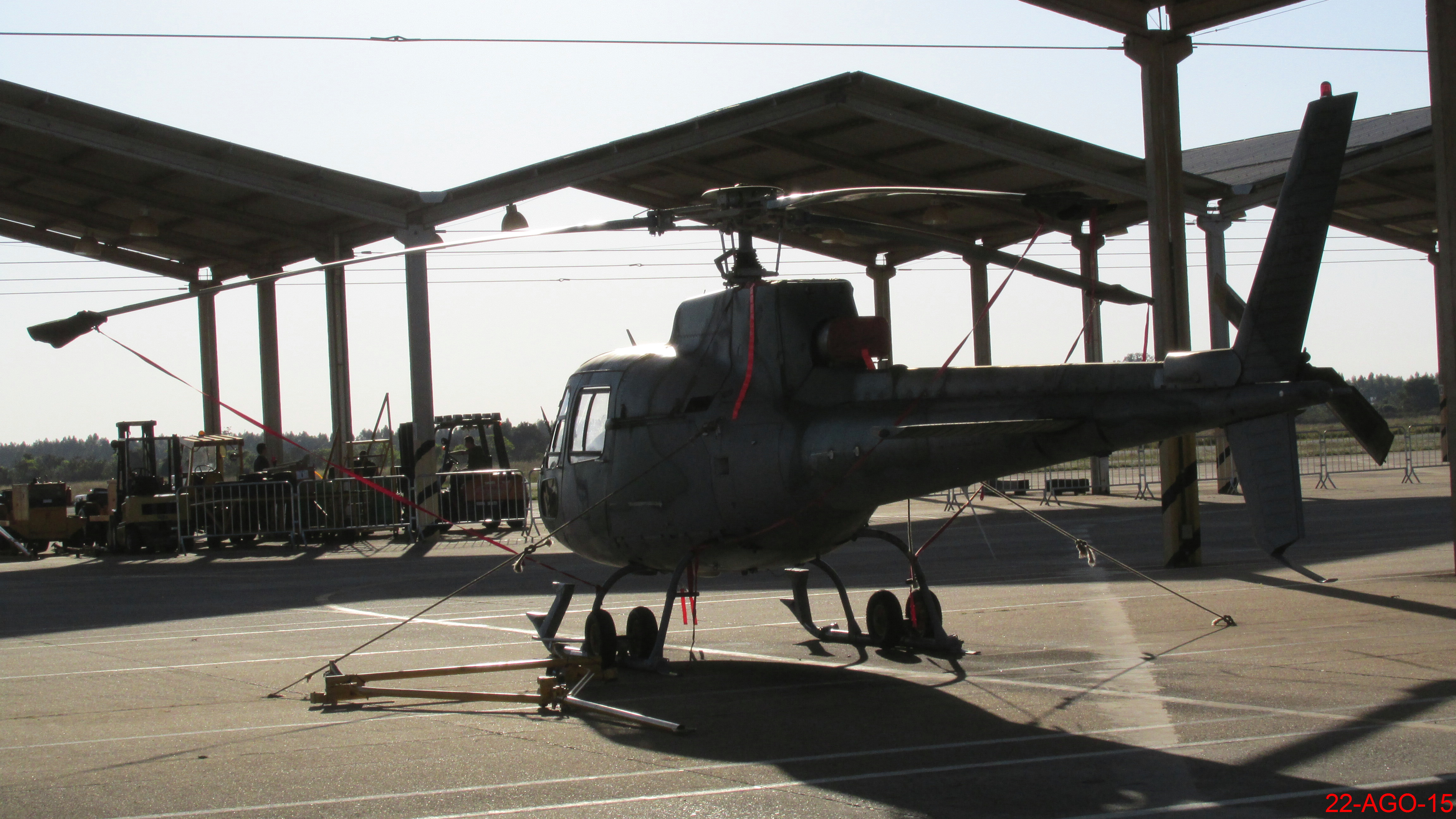
Helibrás H-50 Esquilo (FAB)

== See also ==
- List of Brazilian military bases
- Guarujá Civil Metropolitan Aerodrome
