= Guarujá =

Municipality in São Paulo, Brazil

- Municipality
- Municipality of Guarujá
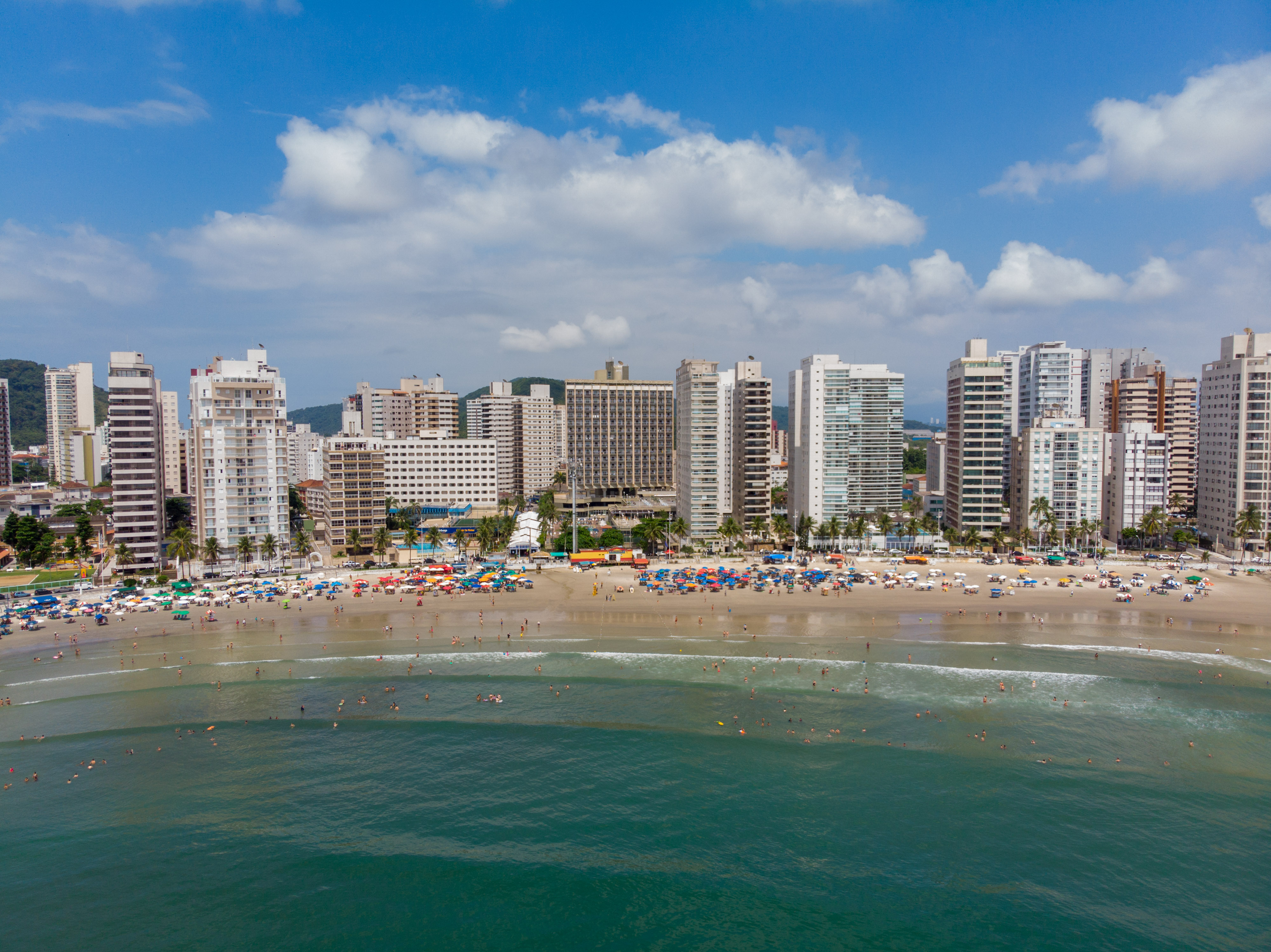
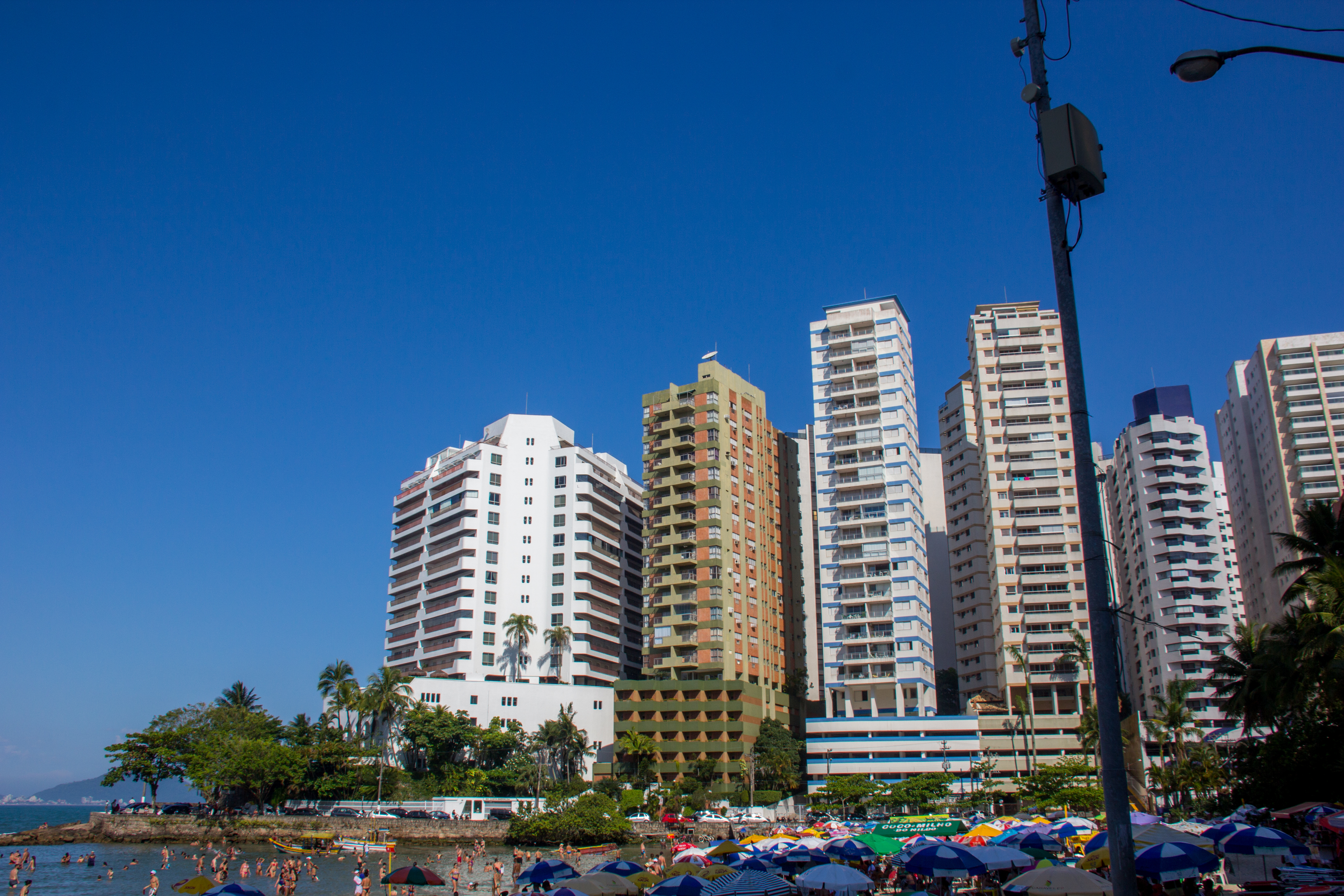
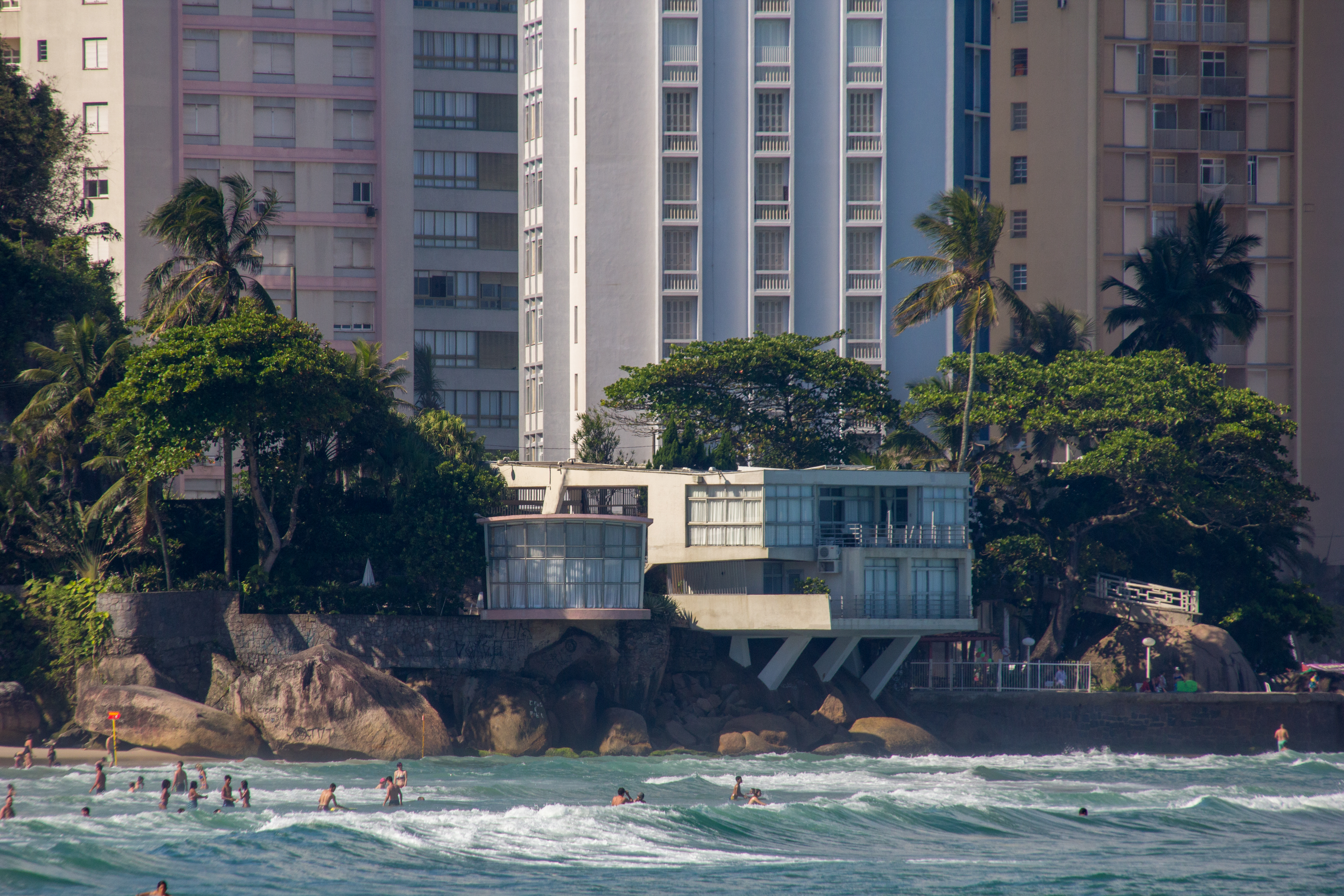
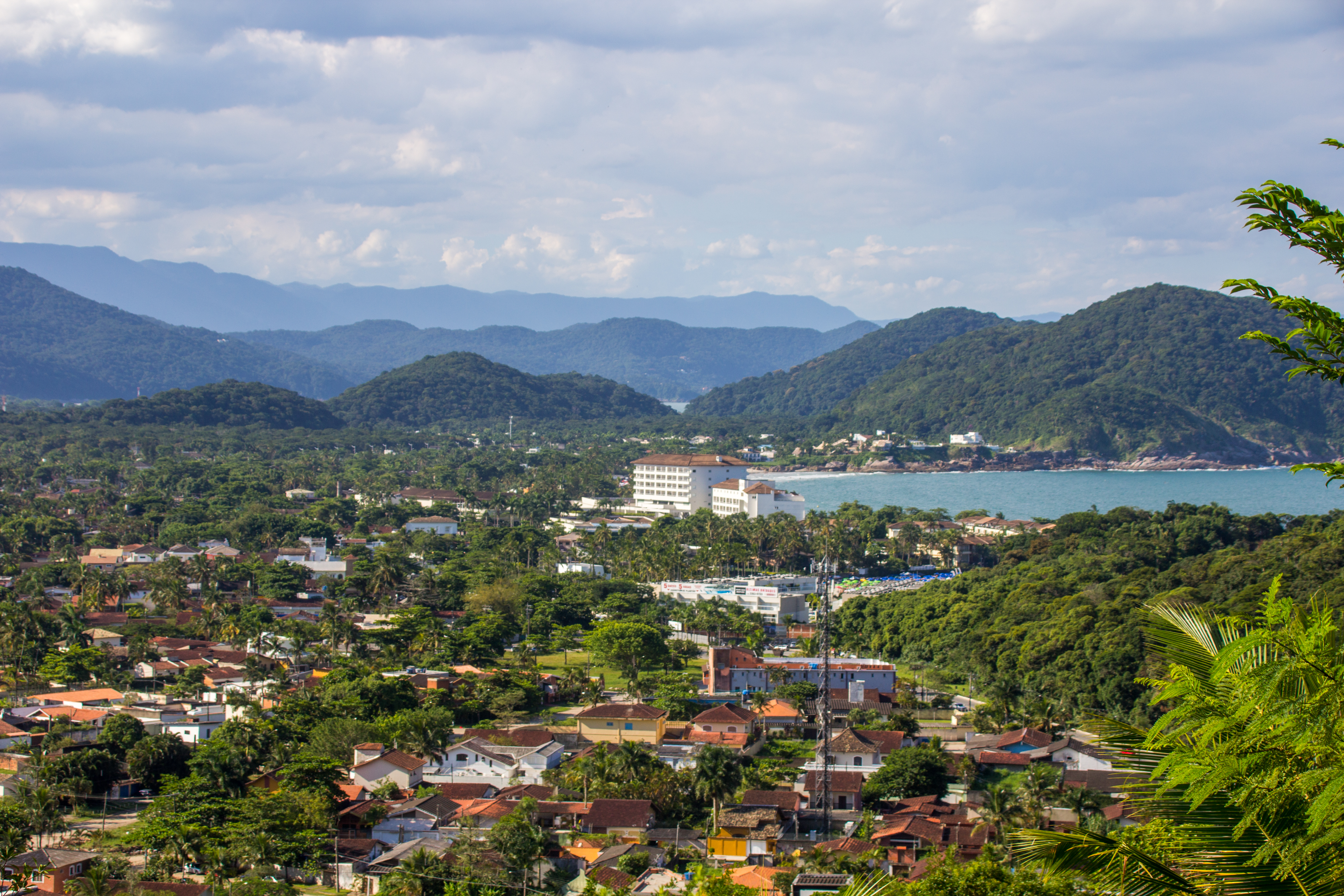
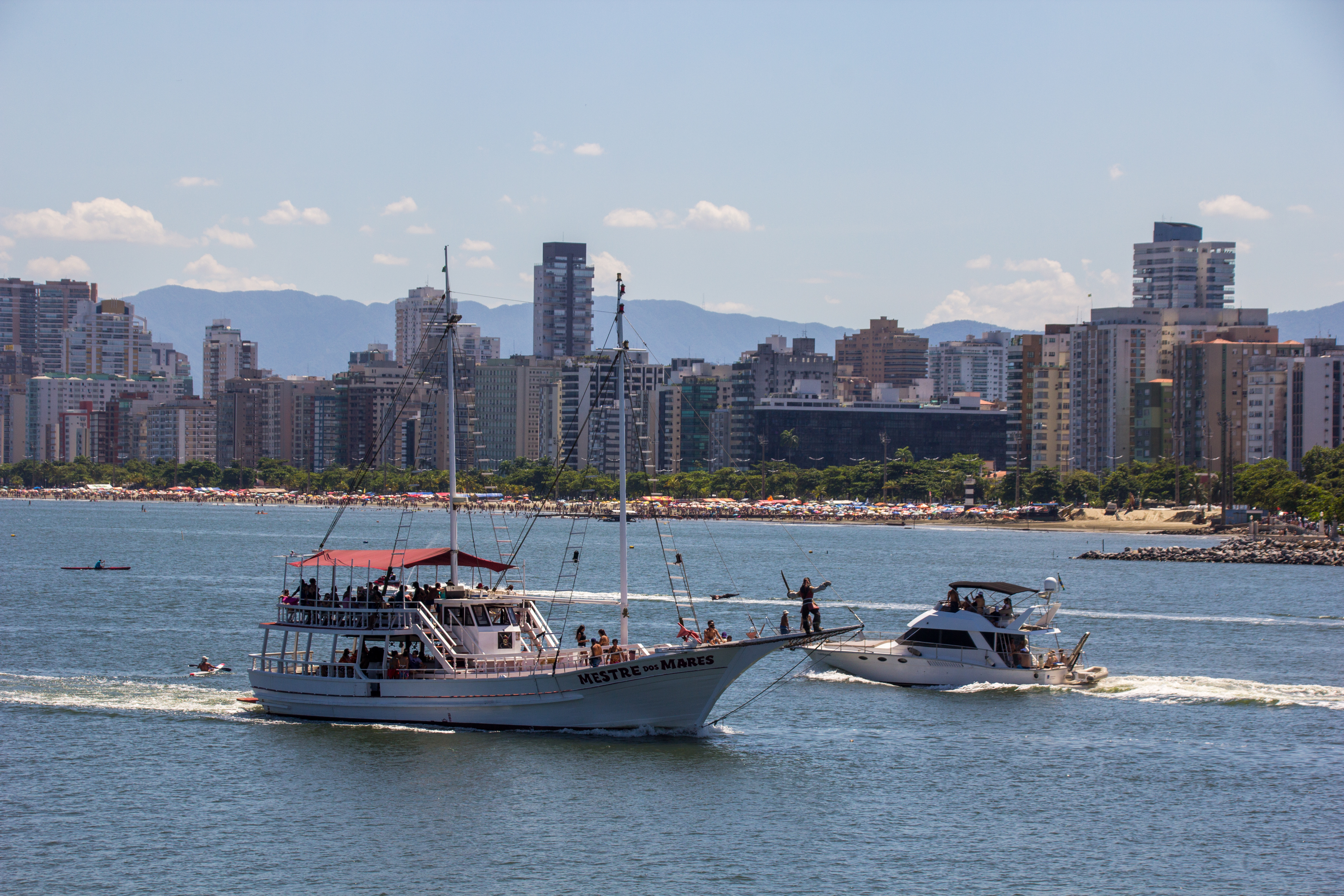
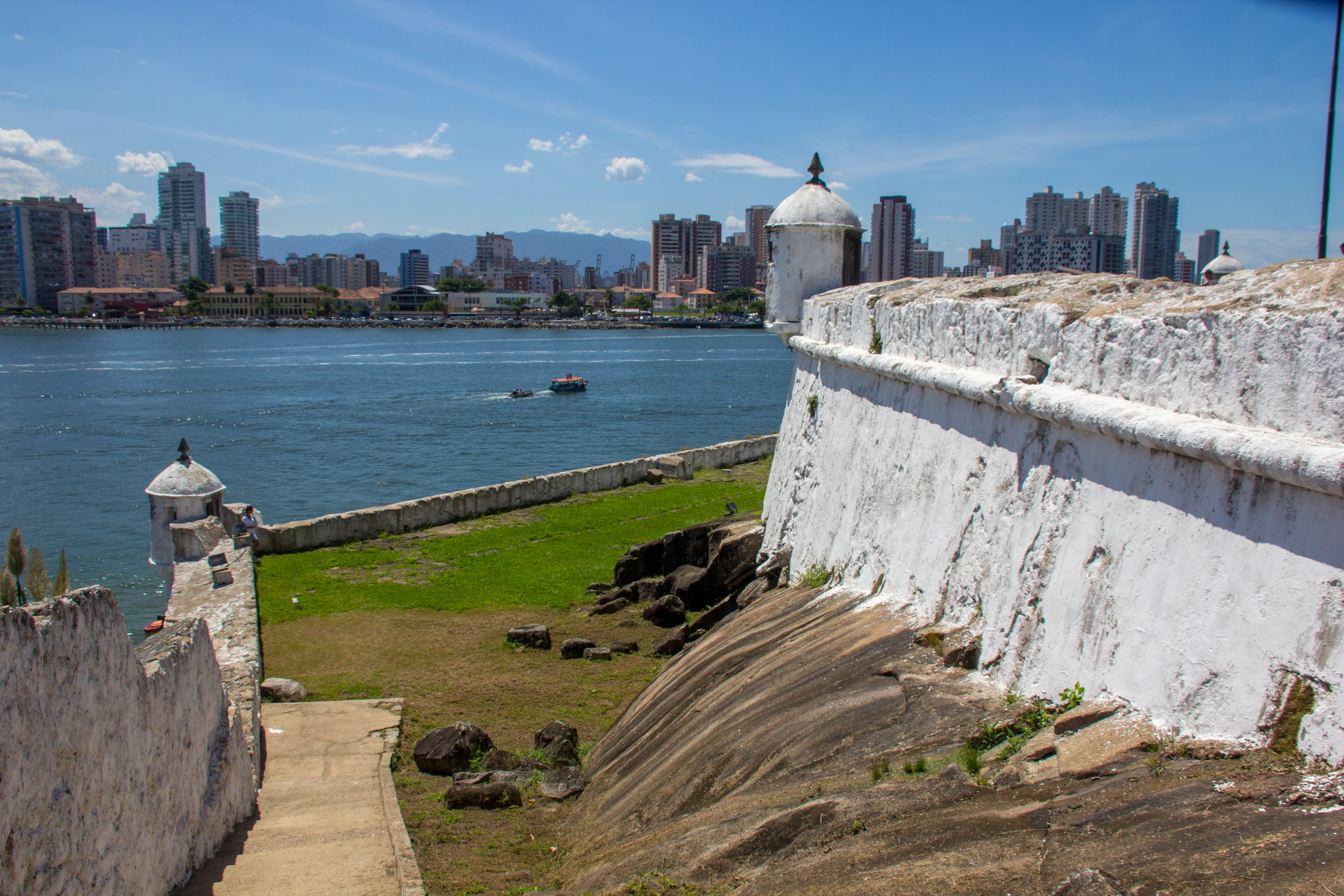
- "Pearl of the Atlantic"

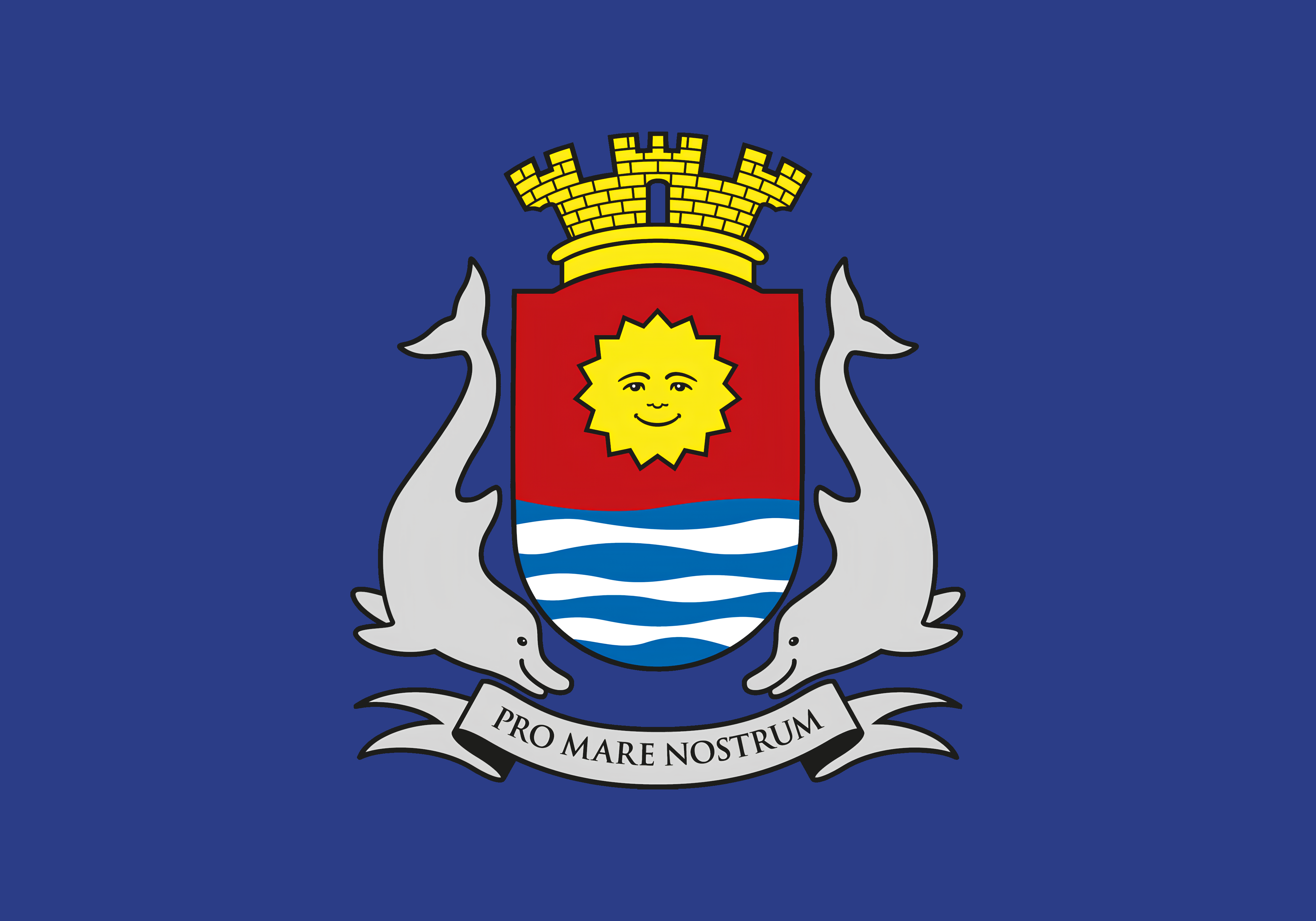
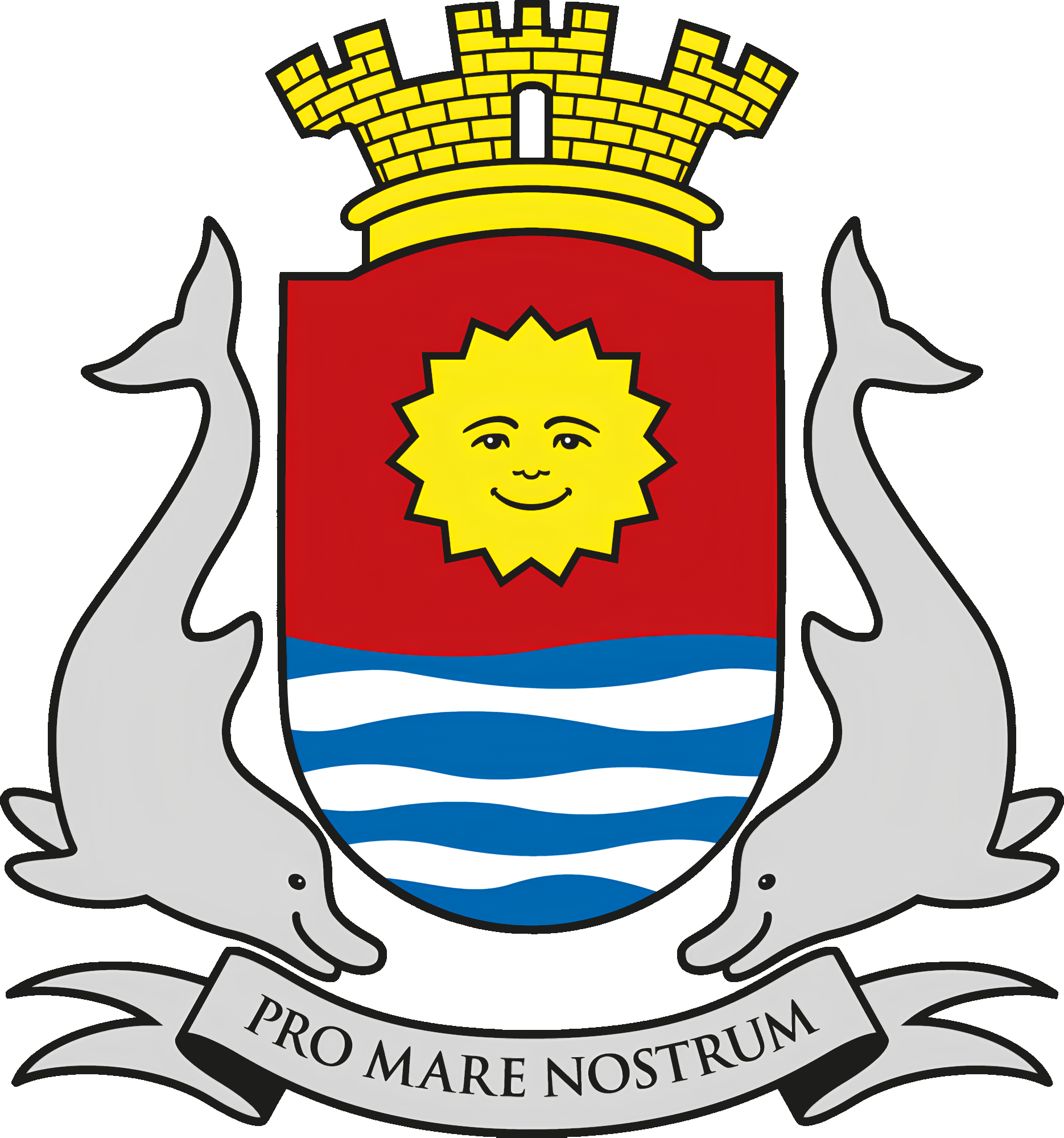
- Flag Coat of arms
- Nickname: Pérola do Atlântico (Pearl of the Atlantic)
- Motto: Pro mare nostrum (Ours by the sea)
- Location in São Paulo

- Location in Brazil
- Coordinates: 23°59′37″S 46°15′23″W
- Country: Brazil
- Region: Southeast
- State: São Paulo
- Metropolitan Region: Baixada Santista
- Founded: 2 September 1893; 133 years ago
- Anniversary: 30 June 1934; 92 years ago

Government
  - Mayor: Farid Said Madi (PODE

Area
  - Municipality: 143.58 km^{2} (55.44 sq mi)
- Elevation: 4 m (13 ft)

Population (2025)
  - Municipality: 294,871
  - Estimate (2026): 298,530
  - Density: 2,053.7/km^{2} (5,319.1/sq mi)
  - Urban: 294,060
- Time zone: UTC−3 (BRT)
- Postal Code: 11400-000
- Area code: +55 13
- HDI (2010): 0.751 – high
- Website: Official website

Guarujá (/ɡwɑːrʊˈʒɑː/; Portuguese pronunciation: [ɡwaɾuˈʒa]) is a municipality in the São Paulo state of Brazil. It is part of the Metropolitan Region of the Baixada Santista. The population is 311,116 (2022 preliminary census count) in an area of 143.58 km^{2} (55.44 sq mi). This place name comes from the Tupi language, and means "narrow path". The population is highly urbanized, forms a 2nd urban core and beachfront island across the river from São Vicente Island, the island (Ilha de Santo Amaro) is coterminous with the municipality, with exception of small offshore isles like Ilha dos Arvoredos.

== Toponym ==
See also: Tupi-Guarani place names in Brazil

As Eduardo Navarro explains in his Dicionário de Tupi Antigo (2013), "Guarujá" is derived from the Tupi term agûarausá, which designates a type of crab, the guaruçá.

Although it is common to use the definite article before the name of the city, this usage is not correct. Therefore, one should say "Tenho casa em Guarujá" and not "Tenho casa no Guarujá".

== Geography ==
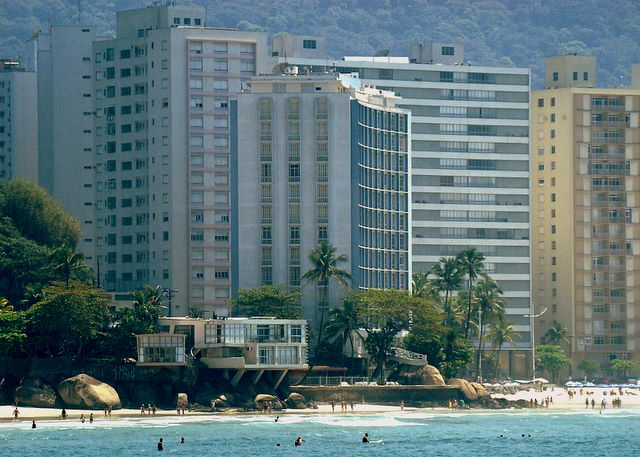
Asturias beach

Guarujá is located on the Santo Amaro Island, situated on the shore of São Paulo. Its main economic sources are seasonal tourism and port related activities.

Guarujá is a popular weekend destination for families from São Paulo, who can get there driving in less than one hour (through the Imigrantes highway). Traffic gets heavy during the evening on the holidays.

Guarujá has a borough called Vicente de Carvalho, in tribute to the Parnasianist poet.

A nickname for the city is "The Pearl of the Atlantic".

In total, Guarujá has 27 beaches, with the most famous including Guaiúba, Tombo, Astúrias, Pitangueiras, Enseada, Pernambuco, Perequê, São Pedro, Tijucopava, Iporanga, Praia Branca and Praia Preta.

== Economy ==
Guarujá, its history, infrastructure and proximity to the country's most populous city, provides strong attractive real estate and tourism. Much of the region on the coast, the beaches near the center (mainly Asturias Pitangueiras, Enseada, and Tombo) are taken by buildings devoted to the seasonal population, who arrives mostly in summer. Tourism, therefore, is the most important component that moves the economy.

The other part, relevant and non-seasonal, comes from the port (left bank of the Port of Santos) and related activities, such as transportation. Due to its proximity to Cubatão (largest industrial district in the country) and ports, there is also interest in industrial occupation in the region, started in 1976 by Dow Chemical, still the only major industry to occupy the region.

According to the IBGE of 2006 the production of wealth in the service area in the city, added that year, US$1.820 billion, equivalent to 0.14% in participation in the Brazilian GDP.

== Twin towns – sister cities ==
Guarujá is twinned with:

- Cascais, Lisbon District, Portugal (2000)
- Brotas, São Paulo, Brazil (2001)
- Lobito, Benguela Province, Angola (2013)

== Tourist attractions ==
- Andradas Fort
- Acqua Mundo
- Teatro Municipal Procópio Ferreira

== Media ==
In telecommunications, the city was served by the Companhia Telefônica Brasileira until 1973, when it began to be served by the Telecomunicações de São Paulo. In July 1998, this company was acquired by Telefónica, which adopted the Vivo brand in 2012.

The company is currently an operator of cell phones, fixed lines, internet (fiber optics/4G) and television (satellite and cable).

== Sports ==
The Estádio Municipal Antônio Fernandes is a football (soccer) stadium located in the city. Associação Desportiva Guarujá play their home games at this stadium. The Bosnia and Herzegovina national football team picked Guarujá as their base during the 2014 FIFA World Cup in Brazil.

Charles Oliveira, the former UFC lightweight champion, was born and raised in Guarujá. He proudly represents Guarujá and is known for his charitable contributions to the community, especially during the COVID-19 pandemic.

== Airport and air force base ==
The Santos Air Force Base – BAST, a base of the Brazilian Air Force, is located in Guarujá.

The city will be served by the Guarujá Civil Metropolitan Aerodrome, located in the vicinity of the air force base.

== Notable people ==
- Kelvin Hoefler, skater, Olympic medalist
- Alexandre Tam, professional soccer player (Santos FC)
- Charles Oliveira, mixed martial artist and former UFC Lightweight Champion
- Cláudia das Neves, women's basketball player
- Diego Gonçalves, professional soccer player (Figueirense FC/Louletano D.C.)
- Jean Paulo Fernandes, retired professional soccer player
- KondZilla, screenwriter, director, producer and YouTuber
- Maria José Dupré, writer and novelist (Eramos Seis)
- Mazinho Oliveira, retired professional soccer player

== See also ==
- List of municipalities in São Paulo
