= List of knights of the Golden Fleece =

This article contains a list of knights of the Order of the Golden Fleece.

== Burgundian Golden Fleece ==
=== 15th century ===
Year of induction	Name	Born	Died	Notes
1430	Philip the Good, Duke of Burgundy	1396	1467	Founder and First Head of the Order
1430	Guillaume de Vienne, Seigneur de Saint-George	1360	1435	
1430	Regnier Pot, Seigneur de la Prugne	?	1432	
1430	Jehan, Seigneur de Roubaix	1369	1449	
1430	Roland d'Uutkercke, Seigneur de Hemsrode	?	1442	
1430	Antoine de Vergy, Comte de Dammartin	?	1439	
1430	David de Brimeu, Seigneur de Ligny	?	1451	
1430	Hue de Lannoy, Seigneur de Santes	1384	1456	
1430	Jehan, Seigneur de Comines	?	1442	
1430	Antoine de Toulonjon	?	1432	Marshal of Burgundy
1430	Pierre de Luxembourg, Comte de Saint-Pol	1390	1433	
1430	Jehan de la Trémoille, Seigneur de Jonvelle	c. 1377	1449	
1430	Guilbert de Lannoy, Seigneur de Villerval	1386	1462	
1430	Jehan de Luxembourg, Comte de Ligny	1385	1440	
1430	Jehan de Villers, Seigneur de l'Isle-Adam	?	1439	
1430	Antoine de Croy, Comte de Porcéan	1390	1475	
1430	Florimond de Brimeu, Seigneur de Massincourt	?	1441	
1430	Robert, Seigneur de Masmines	?	1431	
1430	Jacques de Brimeu, Seigneur de Grigny	?	before 1451	
1430	Baudouin de Lannoy, Seigneur de Molembaix	1388	1474	
1430	Pierre de Bauffremont, Comte de Charny	?	1473	
1430	Philippe, Seigneur de Ternant	1400	1456	
1430	Jehan de Croy, Comte de Chimay	1395	1473	
1430	Jehan, Seigneur de Créqui	1397	1473	
1430	Jehan de Neufchâtel, Seigneur de Montagu	?	1433	
1431	Frédéric, Comte de Meurs	1392	1451	
1431	Simon de Lalaing, Seigneur de Santes	1405	1476	
1432	André de Toulonjon	?	1432	
1432	Jehan de Melun, Seigneur d'Antoing	1398	1484	
1433	Jacques, Seigneur de Crèvecoeur	?	1436	
1433	Jehan de Vergy, Seigneur de Fouvans	1378	1460	
1433	Guy de Pontailler, Seigneur de Tallemé	?	1463	
1433	Baudot de Noyelles-Wion, Seigneur de Casteau	?	1468	
1433	Jean bâtard de Luxembourg, Seigneur de Hautbourdin	?	1466	
1433	Charles of Burgundy, Comte de Charolais	1433	1477	succeeded his father Philip as Duke of Burgundy in 1467; second head of the order
1433	Ruprecht, Comte de Virnebourg	?	1443	
1433	Thibaut de Neufchâtel	1396	1461	
1440	Charles, Duc d'Orléans	1391	1465	
1440	Jean VI, Duc de Bretagne	1389	1442	
1440	Jean II, Duc d'Alençon	1409	1476	
1440	Mathieu de Foix-Comminges	1385	1453	
1445	Alfonso V, King of Aragon and Naples	1394	1458	
1445	Franck de Borsele, Comte d'Ostrevant	1394	1473	
1445	Reinoud II van Brederode	1415	1473	
1445	Henry de Borsele, Seigneur de Vere	1405	1470	
1445	Jean IV, Seigneur d'Auxy	1396	1474	
1445	André, Seigneur d'Humières	1403	1460	
1451	John I, Duke of Cleves	1419	1481	
1451	Juan de Guevara, Count of Ariano	?	1456	
1451	Pedro de Cardona, Count of Colisano	?	1451	
1451	Jehan, Seigneur de Lannoy	1410	1493	
1451	Jacques de Lalaing, Seigneur de Bugincourt	1421	1453	
1451	Jehan de Neufchâtel, Seigneur de Montagu	?	?	
1456	Giosia I Acquaviva, Count of Terrano	?	1462	
1456	Jean de Bourgogne, Duc de Nevers	1415	1491	
1456	Antoine, bastard of Burgundy	1422	1504	
1456	Adolph of Cleves, Lord of Ravenstein	1425	1492	
1456	Prince John of Portugal, Duke of Coimbra	1433	1457	
1461	Juan II, King of Aragon and Navarre	1397	1479	
1461	Adolf the Young, Duke of Gelders	1438	1477	
1461	Thiebault de Neufchâtel, Marshal of Burgundy	1413	1469	
1461	Philippe Pot, Seigneur de La Roche de Nolay	1428	1493	
1461	Loys of Gruuthuse	1427	1492	
1461	Guy, Seigneur de Roye	?	1463	
1468	Edward IV, King of England	1442	1483	
1468	Louis of Chalon, Seigneur de Château-Guyon	1448	1476	
1468	Jean de Damas, Seigneur de Clessy	?	?	
1468	Jacques de Bourbon	1445	1468	
1468	Jacques de Luxembourg, Seigneur de Richebourg	1426	1487	
1468	Philippe de Savoie, Comte de Bresse	1443	1497	
1468	Philippe de Crèvecoeur, Seigneur des Cardes	?	1494	
1468	Claude de Montagu, Seigneur de Couches	?	1470	
1473	Ferdinand V, King of Castile	1452	1516	
1473	Ferdinand I, King of Naples	1423	1494	
1473	Jean de Rubempré, Seigneur de Bièvres	?	1477	
1473	Philippe de Croy, Comte de Chimay	1436	1483	
1473	Jean de Luxembourg, Comte de Marle	1437	1476	
1473	Guy de Brimeu, Seigneur de Humbercourt	?	1477	
1473	Count Engelbert II of Nassau	1451	1504	
1474	Johan Rengers ten Post, Lord of Scharmer and Dijksterhuis	±1410	1494	
1474	Unico II, Baron Ripperda von Farmsum	±1413	?	

== Habsburg Golden Fleece ==
=== 15th century ===
Year of induction	Name	Born	Died	Notes
1478	Archduke Maximilian I of Austria	1459	1519	husband to Marie, Charles the Bold's daughter and heir. Head of the Order until her death in 1482
1478	William II of Egmont	1412	1483	
1478	Wolfart de Borsele, Seigneur de Vere	1430	1487	
1478	Joost de Lalaing, Seigneur de Montigny	1437	1483	
1478	Jacques de Luxembourg, Seigneur de Fiennes	1443	1517	
1478	Philippe de Bourgogne, Seigneur de Beveren	c. 1450	1498	
1478	Peter II de Luxembourg, Count of Saint-Pol	1440	1483	
1478	Jacques de Savoie, Comte de Romont	1450	1486	
1478	Bertrem, Seigneur de Liechtenstein	?	?	
1481	Philip the Fair, Comte de Charolais	1479	1506	eldest son of Maximilian I and Marie; head of the order 1482–1506
1481	Jean, Seigneur de Ligne	1435	1491	
1481	Pierre de Hennin, Seigneur de Boussu	1433	1490	
1481	Baudouin de Lannoy, Seigneur de Molembaix	1436	1501	
1481	Guillaume de la Baume, Seigneur d'Irlain	?	1516	
1481	Jean III, Seigneur de Berghes	1452	1531	
1481	Martin, Seigneur de Polheim	?	1498	
1481	Claude de Toulonjon, Seigneur de la Bastie	?	?	
1491	Frederick III, Holy Roman Emperor	1415	1493	father to Maximilian I and grandfather to Philip
1491	Henry VII, King of England	1457	1509	
1491	Albert III, Duke of Saxony	1443	1500	
1491	Henri de Witthem, Seigneur de Beersel	1440	1515	
1491	Pierre de Lannoy, Seigneur de Fresnoy	1445	1510	
1491	Eberhard V, Count of Württemberg	1445	1496	
1491	Claude de Neufchâtel, Seigneur de Fay	?	1505	
1491	Jean I, Comte d'Egmont	1439	1516	
1491	Christopher, Margrave of Baden-Hachberg	1453	1527	
1491	Jean, Seigneur de Cruninghen	1460	1513	
1491	Charles de Croy, 1st Prince of Chimay	1455	1527	
1491	Guillaume de Croy, Seigneur de Chièvres	1458	1521	
1491	Hugues de Melun, Vicomte de Gand	1454	1524	
1491	Jacques de Luxembourg, Seigneur de Fiennes	?	1535	

=== 16th century ===
Year of induction	Name	Born	Died	Notes
1501	Charles of Ghent, Comte de Charolais	1500	1558	eldest son of Philip the Fair. Head of the Order from 1506 to 1555
1501	Wolfgang von Polheim	1458	1512	
1501	Eitelfried II, Count of Zollern	1458	1512	
1501	Corneille de Berghes, Seigneur de Zevenberghe	1458	1516	
1501	Philippe bâtard de Bourgogne, Bishop of Utrecht	1466	1542	
1501	Michel de Croy, Seigneur de Sempy	?	1516	
1501	Jean de Luxembourg, Seigneur de Ville	?	1508	
1501	Philibert II, Duke of Savoy	1480	1504	
1505	Henry, Prince of Wales	1491	1547	later King Henry VIII of England
1505	Paul von Liechtenstein	?	1513	
1505	Charles I de Lalaing	1466	1525	
1505	Wolfgang von Fürstenberg	1465	1509	
1505	Juan Manuel.Señor de Belmonte	?	1535	
1505	Floris d'Egmont, Count of Buren	1469	1539	
1505	Jacques III, Comte de Hornes	?	1530	
1505	Henry III, Count of Nassau-Breda	1483	1538	
1505	Ferry de Croy, Seigneur de Roeulx	?	1524	
1505	Philibert, Seigneur de Vere	?	1512	
1516	Francis I, King of France	1494	1547	
1516	Archduke Ferdinand of Austria	1503	1564	younger brother of Charles V, later Holy Roman Emperor
1516	Frederick II, Elector Palatine	1482	1556	
1516	John V of Brandenburg-Ansbach	1493	1525	
1516	Guy de la Baume, Comte de Montrevel	?	1516	
1516	Hoyer VI, Comte de Mansfeld	1484	1540	
1516	Laurent de Gorrevod, Comte de Pont de Vaux	?	1527	
1516	Philippe de Croy, 1st Duc d'Aerschot	1496	1549	
1516	Jacques de Gavre, Seigneur de Frezin	?	1537	
1516	Antoine de Croy, Seigneur de Tour-sur-Marne et Sempy	?	1546	
1516	Antoine de Lalaing, Comte de Hoogstraten	1480	1540	
1516	Charles de Lannoy, Seigneur de Senzeille	1482	1527	
1516	Adolphe de Bourgogne, Seigneur de Beveren	1489	1540	
1516	Philibert of Châlon, Prince of Orange	1502	1530	
1516	Felix, Count of Werdenberg	?	1530	
1516	Manuel I, King of Portugal	1469	1521	
1516	Louis II, King of Hungary and Bohemia	1506	1526	
1516	Michael von Wolkenstein	?	1523	
1516	Maximilien de Hornes, Seigneur de Gaesbeek	?	1542	
1516	Guillaume, Seigneur de Ribaupierre	1468	1547	
1516	Jean III, baron de Trazegnies	1470	1550	
1516	Jean van Wassenaar, Vicomte de Leyden	1483	1523	
1516	Maximilien de Berghes, Seigneur de Zevenbergen	?	1545	
1516	François de Melun, Comte d'Espinoy	?	1547	
1516	Jean, Comte d'Egmont	1499	1528	
1519	Fadrique Alvarez de Toledo, 2nd Duke of Alva	c. 1460	1531	
1519	Diego Lopez de Pacheco, 2nd Duke of Escalona	1456	1529	
1519	Diego Hurtado de Mendoza, 3rd Duke of l'Infantado	1461	1531	
1519	Íñigo Fernández de Velasco, 2nd Duke of Frías	1460	1528	
1519	Alvaro de Zuniga y Guzman, 2nd Duke of Béjar	1455	1531	
1519	Antonio Manrique de Lara, 2nd Duke of Najera	1466	1535	
1519	Fernando Ramon Folch, 2nd Duke of Cardona	c. 1470	1543	
1519	Pietro Antonio San Severino, Duke of San Marco	?	?	
1519	Fadrique Enriquez de Cabrera, 2nd Count of Melgar	1466	1538	
1519	Alvaro Perez Osorio, 3rd Marquis of Astorga	?	1523	
1519	Christian II, King of Denmark, Norway, and Sweden	1481	1559	Last Catholic monarch of Denmark, Norway and Sweden. In exile from 1523 and imprisoned from 1532
1519	Sigismund I of Poland	1467	1548	
1519	Jacques de Luxembourg, Comte de Gavre	?	1530	
1519	Adrien de Croy, Comte de Roeulx	?	1555	
1531	John III, King of Portugal	1502	1557	Charles V's brother-in-law
1531	James V, King of Scots	1512	1542	
1531	Ferdinando d'Aragon, Duke of Calabria	1488	1550	
1531	Pedro Fernandez de Velasco, 3rd Duke of Frias	1485	1559	
1531	Philip, Duke of Bavaria	1503	1548	
1531	George, Duke of Saxony	1471	1539	
1531	Beltran II de la Cueva y Toledo, 3rd Duke of Albuquerque	1477	1560	
1531	Andrea Doria, 1st Prince of Melfi	1466	1560	
1531	Philip of Austria, Prince of Asturias	1527	1598	Charles V's eldest son, later Philip II of Spain. Head of the order from 1555
1531	Reinoud III van Brederode	1492	1556	
1531	Ferrante Gonzaga, Duke of Ariano	1507	1557	
1531	Nicholas, Count of Salm	1503	1550	
1531	Claude de la Baume, Seigneur de Mont-Saint-Sorlin	?	1541	
1531	Antoine, Marquis de Berghes	1503	1567	
1531	Jean de Hennin, 1st Comte de Boussu	1480	1562	
1531	Charles, 2nd Comte de Lalaing	1506	1558	
1531	Louis de Flandres, Seigneur de Praet	1488	1555	
1531	Georges Schenck, Seigneur de Tautenburg	1480	1540	
1531	Philippe de Lannoy, Vicomte de Sebourg	1460	1535	
1531	Philippe de Lannoy, Seigneur de Molembaix	1487	1543	
1531	Alfonso d'Avalos d'Aquino, Marquis del Vasto	1502	1546	
1531	Francisco de Zuñiga, 3rd Count of Miranda	?	1536	
1531	Maximilien d'Egmont, Count of Büren	1509	1548	
1531	René de Châlons, Prince of Orange	1518	1544	
1546	Archduke Maximilian of Austria	1527	1576	eldest son of Charles's brother, King Ferdinand. Later Holy Roman Emperor Maximilian II
1546	Iñigo Lopez de Mendoza, 4th Duke of l'Infantado	1503	1566	
1546	Fernando Alvarez de Toledo, 3rd Duke of Alva	1508	1582	
1546	Cosimo I de' Medici, Duke of Florence	1519	1574	later became the first Grand Duke of Tuscany
1546	Albert V, Duke of Bavaria	1528	1579	
1546	Emmanuel Philibert, Prince of Piedmont	1528	1580	later Duke of Savoy
1546	Ottavio Farnese, Duke of Parma	1524	1586	
1546	Juan Esteban Manrique de Lara, 3rd Duke of Najera	1504	1558	
1546	Friedrich von Fürstenberg	1496	1559	
1546	Philippe de Lannoy, 2nd Prince of Sulmone	1514	1553	
1546	Joachim, Seigneur de Rye	?	?	
1546	Ponthus de Lalaing, Seigneur de Bugnicourt	1508	1558	
1546	Lamoral d'Egmont, Prince de Gavre	1522	1568	
1546	Claude de Vergy, Comte de Gruères	1495	1560	
1546	Jacques, Comte de Ligne	?	1552	
1546	Maximilien de Bourgogne, Marquis de Vere	1514	1558	
1546	Peter Ernest, Count of Mansfeld	1517	1604	
1546	Jean de Ligne, Comte d'Arenberg	1525	1568	
1546	Pierre de Barbançon, Stadtholder of Hainault	1500	1557	
1546	Jean de Lannoy, Seigneur de Molembaix	1509	1560	
1546	Pedro Fernández de Córdoba, 4th Count of Feria	1518	1552	
1555	Henry II, Duke of Brunswick-Wolfenbüttel	1489	1568	
1555	Archduke Ferdinand of Austria, Margrave of Burgau	1529	1595	second son of Emperor Ferdinand I
1555	Philippe de Croy, 3rd Duc d'Aerschot	1521	1595	
1555	Gonzalo Fernández de Córdoba (1520-1578)	1520	1578	
1555	Carlos, Prince of Asturias	1545	1568	eldest son of King Philip II
1555	Luis Enriquez de Cabrera, 2nd Duke of Medina de Rioseco	?	1572	
1555	Alfonso de Aragon, 3rd Duke of Cardona	?	1562	
1555	Charles, Baron de Berlaymont	1510	1578	
1555	Philippe de Stavele, Baron de Chaumont	1508	1562	
1555	Charles de Brimeu, Comte de Meghem	1524/25	1572	
1555	Philippe de Montmorency, Count of Horn	1518	1568	
1555	Jean IV, Marquis de Berghes	1528	1567	
1555	William I, Prince of Orange	1533	1584	
1555	Jean de Montmorency, Siegneur de Courrière	?	1563	
1555	Johan I of East Frisia	1506	1572	
1555	Wratislaw von Pernstein	1530	1582	
1555	Francisco Fernando d'Avalos d'Aquino, 5th Marquis of Pescara	?	1571	
1555	Antonio Doria, Marquis of San Stefano	?	?	
1555	Ascanio Sforza-Sforza, Count of Santa Fiora	1520	1575	
1559	Guidobaldo de Montefeltre, Duke of Urbino	1514	1574	
1559	Marcantonio Colonna, Prince of Tagliacozza	1535	1584	
1559	Philip of Montmorency, Lord of Hachicourt	1502	1566	
1559	Baudouin de Lannoy, Seigneur de Molembaix	1518	1559	
1559	Guillaume de Croy, Marquis de Renty	1527	1565	
1559	Floris de Montmorency, Seigneur de Montigny	1528	1567	
1559	Philippe, Count of Ligne	1533	1583	
1559	Charles de Lannoy, 3rd Prince of Sulmone	1537	1568	
1559	Antoine de Lalaing, 3rd Comte de Hoogstraten	1535	1568	
1560	Francis II, King of France	1544	1560	
1561	Joachim von Neuhaus	?	1584	
1565	Charles IX, King of France	1550	1574	
1566	John of Austria	1547	1578	illegitimate son of Charles V; later the victor of Lepanto
1573	Eric II, Duke of Brunswick-Lüneburg	1528	1584	
1581	João I, Duke of Braganza	1547	1583	
1581	Alonso de Guzmán y Sotomayor, 7th Duke of Medina Sidonia	1550	1615	later commander of the Spanish Armada
1583	Philip, Prince Asturias	1578	1621	only surviving son of Philip II, later King Philip III of Spain. Head of the order from 1598
1585	Charles Emmanuel I, Duke of Savoy	1562	1630	son-in-law of Philip II
1585	Luis Enriquez de Cabrera, 3rd Duke of Medina de Rioseco	?	1596	
1585	Juan de la Cerda, 5th Duke of Medinaceli	1544	1594	
1585	Rudolf II, Holy Roman Emperor	1552	1612	son of Maximilian II and nephew of Philip II
1585	Archduke Charles of Inner Austria	1540	1590	youngest son of Ferdinand I
1585	Archduke Ernest of Austria	1513	1595	younger brother of Rudolf II, nephew of Philip II
1585	(William, Vilém) Guillaume Orsini de Rosenberg	1535	1592	
1585	Leonhard Harrach von Rohrau und Pirckenstein	1514	1590	
1585	Horace de Lannoy, 4th Prince of Sulmone	?	1597	
1585	Wilhelm V, Duke of Bavaria	1548	1626	
1585	Francesco I de' Medici, Grand Duke of Tuscany	1541	1587	
1585	Alexander Farnese, Prince of Parma	1545	1592	nephew of Philip II; from 1586, Duke of Parma
1585	Francesco de Montefeltre, Duke of Urbino	1549	1631	
1585	Vespasiano I Gonzaga Colonna, Duke of Sabbioneta	1531	1591	
1585	Carlos de Aragón	c. 1520	1599	
1585	Diego IV Fernandez de Cordoba, 3rd marquis of Comares	1524	1601	not to be confused with the marquis of Camarasa
1586	Marc de Rye, Marquis de Varambon	?	1599	
1586	Maximilian, Count of East Frisia	1542	1600	
1586	Charles de Ligne, 2nd Prince of Arenberg	1550	1616	
1586	Florent, Count of Berlaymont	?	1626	
1586	Philip William d'Egmont, Prince of Gavre	1558	1590	
1586	Emmanuel de Lalaing, Marquis de Renty	1547	1590	
1586	Robert de Melun, Prince d'Espinoy	c. 1550	1585	Died at the Siege of Antwerp before being invested.
1586	Alfonso Felix d'Avalos d'Aragone, 6th Marquis of Pescara	1529	1593	
1586	François de Vergy, Comte de Champlitte	1530	1591	
1586	Francisco de Santapau Varesi, 2nd Prince of Butera	?	1590	
1587	Onorato Caëtani, 6th Marquis of Cisterna	1541	1592	
1587	Jean Khevenhüller de Aichelburg, Count of Frankenburg	1537	1606	
1589	Vincenzo I Gonzaga, Duke of Mantua	1562	1612	
1589	Iñigo Lopez de Mendoza, 5th Duke of l'Infantado	1536	1601	
1589	Juan Fernandez Pacheco, 5th Duke of Escalona	1563	1615	
1589	Pietro de' Medici, Prince of Tuscany	1544	1604	
1596	Archduke Matthias of Austria	1557	1619	later Holy Roman Emperor
1596	Archduke Ferdinand of Austria	1578	1637	later Holy Roman Emperor Ferdinand II
1596	Sigismund Báthory, Prince of Transylvania	1572	1613	
1596	Albert VII, Archduke of Austria	1559	1621	Governor of the Spanish Netherlands
1599	Louis Enriquez de Cabrera, 4th Duke of Medina de Rioseco	?	1600	
1599	Ferrante II Gonzaga, Duke of Ariano	1563	1630	
1599	Juan de la Cerda, 6th Duke of Medinaceli	1569	1607	
1599	Antonio Alvarez de Toledo, 5th Duke of Alba	1568	1639	
1599	Charles de Croy, 4th Duke of Aerschot	1560	1612	
1599	Charles Philippe de Croy, Marquis d'Havré	1549	1613	
1599	Philippe de Croy, Comte de Solre	1561	1612	
1599	Philip William, Prince of Orange	1554	1618	Catholic son of William the Silent
1599	Lamoral de Ligne, Prince d'Espinoy	1563	1624	
1599	Charles d'Egmont, Prince de Gavre	1568	1620	
1599	Claude-François de Vergy, Comte de Champlitte	?	1602	
1600	Pietro Caëtani, 6th Duke of Sermoneta	1564	1614	
1600	Sigismund III, King of Poland	1566	1632	
1600	Rainuccio Farnese, Duke of Parma	1569	1622	
1600	Diego Enriquez de Guzman, 5th Duke of Alba de Lista	?	1604	
1600	Maximilian I, Count Palatine of Zweibrücken	1573	1651	

=== 17th century ===
Year of induction	Name	Born	Died	Notes
1601	Hermann de Berg, Marquis of Bergen op Zoom	1558	1611	
1601	Carlos Tagliava d'Aragona, 2nd Duke of Terranova	?	1605	
1605	Ambrogio Spinola, Marquis of Sesto	1569	1630	
1605	Cesare d'Este, Duke of Modena	1552	1628	
1605	Alexandro Pico, 1st Duke of Mirandola	1567	1637	
1605	Camillo Caracciolo, 2nd Prince of Avellino	1563	1617	
1605	Matteo de Capua, 2nd Prince of Conca	?	?	
1605	Marzio Colonna, Duke of Zagarolo	1584	1607	
1605	Iñigo d'Avalos d'Aquino, 7th Marquis of Pescara	?	?	
1605	Virginio Orsini, 2nd Duke of Bracciano	1573	1615	
1606	Lodovico Carafa de Marra, 4th Prince of Stigliano	1570	1630	
1607	Andrea Matteo Acquaviva d'Aragon, 2nd Prince of Caserta	1570	1635	
1607	Fabrizio Branciforte, 3rd Prince of Butera	?	?	
1607	Antonio de Moncada, 4th Prince of Paterno	1587	1631	
1607	Gian Andrea Doria, 5th Prince of Melfi	1570	1612	
1608	Pedro Téllez-Girón, 3rd Duke of Osuna	1574	1624	
1609	Jean Tagliavia d'Aragon, 3rd Duke of Terranova	1585	1624	
1610	Alonso Diego Lopez de Zuniga, 6th Duke of Béjar	1578	1619	
1610	Francesco Colonna, Prince of Palestrina	1571	1636	
1611	Rodrigo Ponce de Leon, 3rd Duke of Arcos	1545	1630	
1612	Francisco Gonzaga, 3rd Prince of Castiglione	1577	1616	
1612	Frederico Landi, 4th Prince of Val di Taro	?	1630	
1612	Georg Ludwig, Landgrave of Leuchtenberg	1550	1613	
1612	Paul Sixtus Trauston, Count of Falkenstein	1550	1621	
1613	Philip, Prince of Asturias	1605	1665	later King Philip IV of Spain. Head of the order from 1621
1613	Charles de Longueval, Comte de Bucquoy	1571	1621	
1613	Frédéric de Bergen op Zoom, Baron de Boxmeer	1559	1625	
1613	Charles Emmanuel de Gorrevod, Duc de Pont-de-Vaux	1569	1625	
1613	Antoine de Lalaing, 4th Count of Hoogstraten	1588	1613	
1614	Jean de Croy, Comte de Solre	1578	1640	
1615	Emmanuel Domingo Pérez de Guzmán, 8th Duke of Medina Sidonia	1579	1636	
1615	Cleriardus de Vergy, Comte de Champlitte	1580	1630	
1615	Wolfgang William, Count Palatine of Neuburg	1578	1653	
1615	Wladyslaw, Crown Prince of Poland	1595	1648	later King Wladyslaw IV of Poland
1616	Carlo Philiberto d'Este, Marquis d'Este	1571	1651	
1617	Paolo di Sangro, 2nd Prince of San Severo	1569	1624	
1617	Philippe Charles, Comte d'Arenberg	1587	1640	
1617	Charles Alexandre de Croÿ, Marquis d'Havré	1574	1624	
1617	Christophe de Rye de La Palud	?	1663	
1617	Wratislaw, Count of Fürstenberg	1548	1631	
1618	Jean, Comte d'Ostfrise et Ritberg	1566	1625	
1619	Christopher of East Frisia	1569	1636	
1620	John Ulrich, Prince of Eggenberg	1568	1634	
1620	Zdenko Adalbert Poppel, Prince of Lobkowicz	1568	1628	
1620	John George, Count of Hohenzollern-Sigmaringen	1577	1623	
1621	Francisco Diego Lopez de Zuñiga, 7th Duke of Béjar	1596	1636	
1621	Charles de Lalaing, 6th Count of Hoogstraeten	1569	1626	
1621	François Thomas d'Oyselet Perrenot de Granvelle	?	1629	
1621	Luis de Velasco, Count of Salazar	1559	1625	
1621	Guillaume de Melun, Prince of Espinoy	1580	1635	
1622	Charles I, Prince of Liechtenstein	1569	1627	
1622	Leonard Helfrid, Count of Meggau	?	1644	
1623	Infant Carlos of Spain	1607	1632	brother of King Philip IV
1623	Francis Christoph Khevenhüller, Count of Frankenburg	1588	1650	
1624	John III, Count of Nassau	1583	1638	
1624	Archibald Campbell, 7th Earl of Argyll	1576	1638	
1624	Philippe, Lord of Rubempré	?	1639	
1624	Alexandre I, duc de Bournonville	1586	1656	
1624	Louis d'Egmont, Prince of Gavre	1596	1654	
1624	Alexandre, Prince of Arenberg and Chimay	1599	1629	
1624	Paolo Savelli, 1st Prince of Albano	1571	1632	
1624	Honoré I, Prince of Monaco	1597	1662	
1624	Fabricio Carafa, Prince of La Roccella	?	?	
1624	Marino Caracciolo, 3rd Prince of Avellino	1587	1630	
1624	Archduke Ferdinand of Austria	1608	1657	later Emperor Ferdinand III
1626	Archduke Leopold V of Austria	1586	1632	
1627	Alonso Fernández de Córdoba, 5th Duke of Feria	1588	1645	
1627	Karl, Count Harrach von Rohrau	1570	1628	
1627	Georg Ludwig, Count of Schwarzenberg	1586	1646	
1627	Tiberio Vincenzo del Bosco, 3rd Prince of Cattolica	?	1654	
1628	Albrecht von Wallenstein, Duke of Friedland	1583	1634	
1628	Maximilian, Count of Sainte-Adelgonde	?	1635	
1628	Jean of Montmorency, 1st Prince of Robecque	?	1631	
1628	Maximilien II de Hénin, 5th Count of Bossu	?	1635	
1628	Tiberio Carafa, 6th Prince of Bisignano	1580	1647	
1628	Johann Jakob, Count of Bronckhorst and Anholt	1580	1630	
1628	Ottavio Visconti, Count of Gamalerio	?	1632	
1628	Luis Fernández de Córdoba, 7th Duke of Cardona	1608	1670	
1628	Albert de Ligne, Prince of Barbançon	1600	1674	
1628	Otto Heinrich Fugger, Count of Kirchberg	1592	1644	
1628	Nicholas, Count Esterházy de Galántha	1582	1645	
1629	Ramboldo, Count of Collalto	1575	1630	
1630	Philippe Lamoral de Gand, Count of Isenghien	1587	1631	
1631	Filippo Spinola, 2nd Marquis of Los Balbases	1596	1659	
1631	Gottfried Heinrich Graf zu Pappenheim	1594	1632	
1631	Adam von Waldstein	1570	1638	
1633	Gianbattista de Capua, Prince of Caspoli	?	1634	
1634	Etoro Ravaschiero, Prince of Satriano	?	?	
1634	Paolo de Sangro, 4th Prince of San Severo	1605	1636	
1634	Ercole Teodoro Trivulzio, 2nd Prince Musocco	1620	1664	
1634	Maximilian, Prince of Dietrichstein	1596	1655	
1634	Maximilian, Count of Trauttmansdorff-Weinsberg	1584	1650	
1635	Archduke Ferdinand Karl of Austria	1628	1662	
1638	Claude de Lannoy, 1st Count of la Motterie	1578	1643	
1638	Balthasar Carlos, Prince of Asturias	1629	1646	son of King Philip IV
1638	Francesco I d'Este, Duke of Modena	1610	1658	Brother-in-law of Maffeo Barberini (through his final marriage to Lucrezia Barberini); also a Knight of the Golden Fleece.
1638	John II Casimir Vasa, King of Poland	1609	1672	
1639	Siegfried Christoph von Breuner	1569	1651	
1639	Rudolf von Tiefenbach	1582	1653	
1639	William, Margrave of Baden-Baden	1593	1677	
1639	Francesco Maria Carafa, 5th Duke of Nocera	?	1642	Viceroy of Aragon and of Navarre
1642	Carlo de Tocco, Duke of Leucada	?	1674	
1644	Ottavio Piccolomini, 1st Duke of Amalfi	1599	1655	
1644	Philippe Balthazar de Gand	1617	1680	
1644	Wilhelm, Count of Slawata	1572	1652	
1644	Wenzel Poppel, Prince Lobkowicz	1609	1677	
1644	Anton Ulrich, Prince of Eggenberg	1610	1649	
1644	Heinrich Schlick, Count of Passau	?	1650	
1644	Francesco del Carretto, 2nd Marquis of Grana	?	1651	
1645	Sigismund Ludwig, Count of Dietrichstein	?	1678	
1646	Philippe François, 1st Duke of Arenberg	1625	1674	
1646	Eugène de Hénin, 6th Count of Bossu	?	1656	
1646	Philippe François de Croy, Duke of Havré	1609	1650	
1646	Claude Lamoral, Prince of Ligne	1610	1679	
1646	Philippe d'Arenberg, Prince of Chimay	1619	1675	
1646	Eustache de Croy, Count of Roeulx	1609	1653	
1647	George Adam Borzitza, Count of Martinitz	1602	1651	
1647	John Louis, Prince of Nassau-Hadamar	1590	1653	
1648	Juan Francisco Pimentel, 7th Duke of Benavente	1594	1652	
1648	Nicolo Maria de Guzman, 7th Prince of Stigliano	1638	1689	
1648	Heinrich Wilhelm von Starhemberg	1593	1675	
1649	Diego Fernandez Pacheco Portocarrero, 7th Duke of Escalona	1599	1653	
1650	Ferdinand IV, King of Hungary and Bohemia	1634	1654	son of Emperor Ferdinand III
1650	Paul von Palffy d'Erdödod, Palatine of Hungary	1589	1653	
1650	Johann Weikhard, Prince of Auersperg	1615	1677	
1650	Sigismondo Sfrodati, Marquis of Montafia	?	1652	
1650	Charles Albert de Longueval, Count of Bucquoy	1607	1663	
1650	Johann Adolf, Count of Schwarzenberg	1615	1685	
1651	Luis de Moncada, 7th Duke of Montalto	1614	1672	
1651	Luis Ramon de Aragón, Duke of Cardona	1608	1670	Already mentioned in 1628.
1651	Diego d'Aragon, 4th Duke of Terranova	1596	1663	
1651	Ferdinand del Carreto, Marquis of Grana	?	1651	son of Francesco del Carretto, 2nd Marquis of Grana
1653	Philip William, Count Palatine of Neuburg	1615	1690	
1653	Georg Achaz, Count of Losenstein	1597	1653	
1653	Johann Franz Trautson, Count of Falkenstein	1609	1663	
1653	Marcantonio V Colonna, 5th Prince of Paliano	1606/10	1659	Father of Lorenzo Onofrio Colonna and uncle of Maffeo Barberini; also Knights of the Golden Fleece.
1653	Francesco Filomarino, Prince of Rocca d'Aspro	1606	1659	
1654	Archduke Leopold of Austria	1640	1705	later Emperor Leopold I. 1st head of the Austrian Branch of the Order from the King Charles II of Spain's death (1700) as heir of Philip the Good (House of Habsburg's Chief)
1654	Luis Ignacio Fernández de Córdoba, 6th Duke of Feria	1623	1665	
1655	Maximilian Adam von Waldstein	?	1654	
1655	Johann Maximilian von Lamberg	1608	1682	
1656	Alonso Lopez de Zuniga, 8th Duke of Béjar	1621	1660	
1657	John Ferdinand, Count of Porcia	1605	1665	
1657	Bernard Borzita, Count of Martinitz, Palatine of Hungary	1603	1665	
1657	Annibal Gonzague, Prince of San Martino	1602	1668	
1657	Jean Christophe, Count of Puchheim	1605	1657	
1657	Charles d'Este, Marquis of Borgomanero	1622	1695	
1657	Niccolò Ludovisi, Prince of Piombino	1610	1664	
1657	Philippe Emmanuel of Croy, Count of Solre	1611	1670	
1658	Bernardino Savelli, 2nd Prince of Albano	1606	1658	
1659	Jules Savelli, 3rd Prince of Albano	1626	1712	
1659	Bernard Fabricio Pignatelli, 5th Duke of Monteleone	1606	1664	
1659	Francesco IV Caetani, 8th Duke of Sermoneta	1594	1683	
1661	John Francis, Prince of Nassau	1627	1699	
1661	Ferdinand Bonaventura, Count of Harrach	1636	1706	
1662	Giovanni Battista Borghese, 2nd Prince of Sulmona	1639	1717	
1662	Francis, Count Wesselenyi of Hadad	1605	1667	
1662	Raimundo de Lencastre Manrique de Cardenas, 4th Duke of Aveiro	1620	1666	
1663	John, Count of Rottal	?	1674	
1663	George Louis, Count of Sinzendorf	1616	1681	
1663	Francesco Marino Caracciolo, 4th Prince of Avellino	1631	1674	
1663	Sigismund, Archduke of Austria, Count of Tyrol	1630	1665	
1663	Francis Eusebius, Count of Pötting	?	1678	
1663	Philip II Caetani, 4th Prince of Caserta	1626	1687	
1664	Nicolas, Count of Zrin	1620	1664	
1664	Antonio Teodoro Trivulzio, 3rd Prince of Musocco	1649	1678	
1665	Walther, Count of Leslie	1606	1667	
1665	Charles II, King of Spain	1661	1700	Head of the Order from 1665 to 1700
1667	Francis Albert, Count of Harrach	1614	1666	
1668	Manuel Diego Lopez de Zuniga, 10th Duke of Béjar	1657	1686	
1668	Philippe Spinola, Comte de Bruay	1612	1670	
1668	Ferdinand Joseph, Prince of Dietrichstein	1636	1698	
1668	Raimondo Montecuccoli	1609	1680	
1668	Albert Francis de Croy, Count of Meghem	1615	1674	
1668	Lorenzo Onofrio Colonna 6th Duke of Paliano	1637	1689	Son of Marcantonio V Colonna and cousin of Maffeo Barberini; both also Knights of the Golden Fleece.
1668	Marzio Carafa, 7th Duke of Maddaloni	?	?	
1668	Maffeo Barberini, Prince of Palestrina	1631	1685	Brother-in-law (by the marriage of his sister, Lucrezia Barberini) of Francesco I d'Este, Duke of Modena, also a Knight of the Golden Fleece.
1669	Balthasar Sarmiento de Mendoza, 5th Marquis of Camarasa	?	1715	
1669	Michał Korybut Wiśniowiecki, King of Poland	1640	1673	
1669	Giovanni Battista Ludovisio, Prince of Piombino	1638	1699	
1669	Teobaldo, Marquis of Visconti, Count of Gallarate	?	1674	
1670	Charles Louis de Bauffremont, Marquis of Messimieux	?	1682	
1670	Juan Francisco de la Cerda, 8th Duke of Medinaceli	1637	1691	
1670	Pedro Nuño Colón de Portugal, 6th Duke of Veragua	1628	1673	
1670	Ettore Pignatelli d'Aragon, 6th Duke of Monteleone	1620	1674	
1670	Philip II, Count of Egmont and Prince of Gavre	1623	1682	
1670	Ferdinand Francis de Croy, Duke of Havré	1644	1694	
1670	Charles, Baron of Watteville and Marquis of Conflans	1638	1670	
1671	David Ungnad, Count of Weissenwolff	1604	1672	
1671	Julius Cesar Colonna, Prince of Carbognano	1602	1681	
1672	John Hartwig, Count of Nostitz	1610	1683	
1672	Gundakar of Dietrichstein	1623	1690	
1672	Fernando Francisco de Avalos y Aquino, 10th Marquis of Pescara	?	1672	
1673	Juan de Velasco y Henin, 5th Count of Salazar	1609	1678	
1674	Alexander II, Duke of Bournonville and Count of Hennin	1616	1690	
1674	Albert, Count of Zinzendorff and Pottendorff	1618	1683	
1675	Charles Henri de Lorraine, Prince of Vaudémont	1642	1723	
1675	Carlantonio Spinelli, 5th Prince of Cariati	1645	1725	
1675	John Hubert, Count Czernin of Chudenicz	1628	1682	
1675	Leopold William, Count of Königsegg and Rothenfels	1630	1694	
1675	Charles Ferdinand, Count of Waldstein	1634	1702	
1675	Alexander Farnese, Prince of Parma	1635	1689	Governor of the Habsburg Netherlands (1678–1682).
1675	Ernest Alexander of Arenberg, Prince of Chimay	1643	1686	
1675	Antonio Álvarez de Toledo y Pimentel, 7th Duke of Alba	1615	1690	
1675	Pedro II Manuel Colón y Portugal, 7th Duke of Veragua	1651	1710	
1675	André Fabrizio Pignatelli d'Aragona, 7th Duke of Monteleone	1640	1677	
1675	Antonio, Count of Trotti Bentivoglio	1627	1681	
1675	Eugène of Montmorency, 2nd Prince of Robecque	1615	1683	
1675	Jean-Charles de Watteville, Marquis of Conflans	1628	1699	
1678	Othon Henri del Caretto, Marquis of Savona	1639	1685	
1678	Charles V, Duke of Lorraine	1643	1690	
1678	Charles, Count of Borromeo Arona	1657	1734	
1678	Cesar, Marquis of Visconti	1643	1716	
1678	Carlos de Aragón de Gurrea, 9th duke of Villahermosa	1634	1692	
1678	Charles Eugene, 2nd Duke of Arenberg	1633	1681	
1680	Antonio Alvarez de Toledo, 8th Duke of Alba	1627	1701	
1681	Conrad Balthazar, Count of Starhemberg	1648	1730	
1681	Sigismund Helfried II, Count of Dietrichstein	1635	1698	
1681	Giuseppe Branciforte, Prince of Pietraperia	?	1698	
1681	Francis Maximilian, Count of Mansfeld	1639	1692	
1681	Dominico Marzio Carafa, 8th Duke of Maddaloni	?	?	
1681	Paul I, 1st Prince Esterházy of Galántha	1635	1713	
1682	Octavius Ignatius, Prince of Arenberg and Barbançon	1643	1693	
1682	John Ernest, Duke of Schleswig-Holstein	1637	1700	
1682	Jakub Ludwik Sobieski	1667	1737	Crown Prince of Poland
1682	Ernest Rudiger, Count of Starhemberg	1638	1701	
1683	Henri Francis Philip of Melun, Marquis of Richebourg	1627	1690	
1684	Francis Marie Carafa, 3rd Prince of Belvedere	?	1711	
1684	Henri Louis Ernest, Prince of Ligne	1644	1702	
1684	Francis Augustine, Count of Waldstein	1657	1734	
1685	Philippe Charles, 3rd Duke of Arenberg	1663	1691	
1685	Henri Francis, Count of Mannsfeld and Prince of Fondi	1646	1715	
1686	John Francis, Count palatine, Duke of Bavaria	1658	1716	
1686	Juan Manuel Diego López de Zuniga, 11th Duke of Béjar	1680	1747	
1687	Archduke Joseph of Austria	1678	1711	later Emperor Joseph I. Head of the Austrian order from 1705
1687	Eugene, Prince of Savoy	1663	1736	
1687	Louis Ernest, Count of Egmont and Prince of Gavre	1665	1693	
1687	Iñigo Manuel Vélez de Guevara, 10th Count of Oñate	1642	1699	
1687	Juan Manuel López de Pacheco, 8th Duke of Escalona	1648	1725	
1687	Helmhard Christopher Ungnad, Count of Weissenwolff	1635	1702	
1687	Adolf Wratislas, Count of Sternberg	1627	1703	
1687	Wolfgang Andreas Orsini, Count of Rosenberg	1626	1695	
1687	Amadeus, Count of Windisch-Graetz	1630	1695	
1687	Dominikus Andreas, Count of Kaunitz	1655	1705	
1687	Philippe-Louis de Hénin, 7th Count of Bossu	1646	1688	
1687	Eugen Alexander Franz, 1st Prince of Thurn and Taxis	1677	1714	
1687	Jaime de Silva Fernández, Duke of Hijar	c. 1623	1700	
1687	Eugene de Berghes, Prince of Rache	1624	1688	
1687	Urbano Barberini, 3rd Prince of Palestrina	1666	1722	Son of Maffeo Barberini, also Knight of the Golden Fleece.
1687	Ferdinand Gaston Lamoral de Croy, Count of Roeulx	1660	1720	
1687	Luis Fernández de Córdoba, 7th Duke of Feria	1650	1690	
1688	Francis Charles Liebsteinsky, Count of Kolowrat	1620	1700	
1688	Francis, Count of Kinsky of Wchinitz and Tettau	1632	1699	
1688	John Quentin, Count of Jörger	1624	1705	
1688	Ferdinand, Prince of Schwarzenberg	1652	1703	
1688	Antoine Carafa, Count of Forli	1642	1693	
1689	Filippo II Colonna	1663	1714	Prince of Paliano and High Constable of Naples from 1689. Son of Lorenzo Onofrio Colonna; also a Knight of the Golden Fleece.
1690	Leopold Joseph, Duke of Lorraine and Bar	1679	1729	
1690	Manuel Fernández de Córdoba, 8th Duke of Feria	1679	1700	
1691	Louis William, Margrave of Baden	1655	1707	
1692	Maximilian II Emanuel, Elector of Bavaria	1666	1726	
1692	Fernando de Castro Portugal, 11th Count of Lemos	1666	1741	
1693	Gregorio de Silva y Mendoza, 9th Duke of Infantado	1640	1693	
1694	Charles-Louis de Hennin de Boussu, Prince de Chimay	1674	1740	
1694	Balthazar Naselli del Carillo, Prince of Aragona	?	1720	
1694	Giuseppe Mattei Orsini, 3rd Duke of Paganica	1673	1740	
1694	Philippe François de Berghes, 1st Prince of Grimberghen	1646	1704	
1694	Marino III, 5th Prince of Avellino	1668	1720	
1694	Jean Philippe, Count of Mérode and Marquis de Westerloo	1674	1732	
1694	Christopher Leopold, Count of Schaffgotsch	1623	1703	
1694	Francis Joseph, Count (later Prince) of Lamberg	1637	1712	
1694	Hans-Adam I, Prince of Liechtenstein	1656	1712	
1694	Jean Chrétien, Duke of Cromau and Prince of Eggenberg	1641	1710	
1694	Otto Honorius, Count of Abensperg-Traun	1644	1715	
1694	Philip Sigismund, Count of Dietrichstein	1651	1716	
1694	Enea, Count of Caprara	1631	1701	
1694	Charles III Philip of Bavaria, Elector Palatine of Rhin	1661	1742	
1695	Antonio Francesco, Count of Collalto	1630	1696	
1695	Ferdinand Wenceslas Poppel, Count of Lobkowicz	1654	1697	
1695	Cesar, Marquis of Vidoni	?	1772	
1695	Ferdinand Marquard, Count of Wartenberg	1673	1730	
1695	Íñigo de la Cruz Manrique de Lara, 11th Count of Aguilar	1673	1733	
1697	Aloys Thomas, Count of Harrach	1669	1742	Viceroy of Naples
1697	Charles Carafa, 4th Prince of Belvedere	?	?	
1697	Archduke Charles of Austria	1685	1740	later Emperor Charles VI. Head of the Austrian order from 1711
1697	George Louis, Landgrave of Hesse-Darmstadt	1669	1705	
1697	John Siegfried, Duke of Cromau and Prince of Eggenberg	1644	1713	
1697	Anton Florian, Prince of Liechtenstein	1656	1721	
1697	Leopold Ignacius, Prince of Montecuccoli	1662	1698	
1697	John Francis, Count of Wrbna and Freudenthal	1634	1705	
1697	Siegfried Christopher, Count of Breuner von Aspern	?	1698	
1697	Maximilian, Count of Thun	1638	1701	
1697	George Adam, Count of Martinitz-Borzita	?	1714	
1697	Augustus II, King of Poland	1670	1733	
1698	Ferdinand Augustus Poppel, Prince of Lobkowicz	1655	1715	
1698	Octavius, Marquis of Cavriani	?	?	
1698	Nicolas Placido Branciforte, Prince of Pietrapercia	1651	1723	
1698	John Leopold, Prince of Trautson and Count of Falkenstein	1659	1724	
1698	Charles Ernest, Count of Waldstein	1661	1713	
1698	Leopold Ignaz Joseph, Prince of Dietrichstein	1660	1708	
1699	Francis Taffe, Count of Carlingfort	1639	1704	
1699	Côme Claude d'Ognies, Count of Coupigny	1646	1709	
1699	Wenceslaus Albert, Count of Sternberg	1643	1708	
1700	Cesar of Avalos and Aquino, 12th Marquis of Pescara	1667	1729	
1700	Guillaume de Melun, Marquis of Richebourg	1670	1734	
1700	Philippe Antoine, Prince of Rubempré	1650	1707	
1700	Charles Emmanuel of Watteville, Marquis of Conflans	1656	1728	
1700	Domenico d'Acquaviva et d'Aragon, comte de Conversano	?	?	
1700	Leopold Philip, 4th Duke of Arenberg	1690	1754	
1700	Francesco Ferdinando I Gravina Cruyllas, 4th Prince of Palagonia	?	1736	
1700	Ernest Frederic, Count of Windisch-Graetz	1670	1727	
1700	Leopold Joseph, Count of Lamberg	1653	1706	
1700	Joseph Matthias, Count of Lamberg	1667	1711	
1700	Charles, Count of Archinto	1670	1732	
1700	Charles Thomas de Lorraine, Prince of Commercy and Vaudémont	1670	1704	

== Spanish Golden Fleece ==
=== 18th century ===
Year of induction	Name	Born	Died	Notes
1701	Philip V, King of Spain	1682	1746	Grandnephew of King Charles II of Spain. 1st head of the Spanish Branch of the Order from the King's death as his successor.
1701	Charles, Duke of Berry	1686	1714	
1701	Philip I, Duke of Orléans	1640	1701	
1701	Paul de Beauvilliers, 2nd duc de Saint-Aignan	1648	1714	
1701	Philippe II, Duke of Orléans	1674	1723	Regent of France
1701	Charles Albert of Bavaria	1697	1745	later Elector of Bavaria and Emperor Charles VII
1702	Adrien Maurice, Duke of Noailles	1678	1766	
1702	Albert Alfred, Count then Prince of Serclaes-Tilly	1646	1715	
1702	Antonio Buoncompagni Ludovisi Ruffo, 5th Duke of Sora, Prince of Piombino	1658	1731	
1702	Giovanni Geronimo Acquaviva d'Aragona, 15th Duke of Atri	1663	1709	
1702	Louis François d'Harcourt, Count of Beuvron	1677	1714	
1702	Louis Joseph de Bourbon, Duke of Vendôme	1654	1712	
1703	Jean François de Bette, Marquis of Lede	1667	1725	
1703	Louis François, Duke of Boufflers	1644	1711	
1704	Louis Alexandre de Bourbon, Count of Toulouse	1678	1737	
1704	James FitzJames, 1st Duke of Berwick and Liria	1670	1734	
1705	Jean Frédéric, Count of Autel	1645	1716	
1705	Antoine Charles, Duke of Gramont	1641	1720	
1706	Procope François, Count of Egmont and Prince of Gavre	1664	1707	
1706	Maximilian Gaëtan, Count of Toerring Seefeld	1670	1752	
1706	Alphonse Dominique François, Prince de Berghes	?	1720	son of Philippe François, Prince de Berghes
1706	Victor Marie, Duke of Estrées	1660	1737	
1707	Charles Antoine, Duke of Croy-Havré	1683	1710	
1707	Francisco Fernández de la Cueva, 10th Duke of Alburquerque	1666	1733	
1707	Francisco Pío de Saboya, 6th Marquis of Castel Rodrigo	1672	1723	
1707	Alexandre Maître, Marquis de Bay	1650	1715	
1708	Francis II Rákóczi, Prince of Transylvania	1676	1735	
1709	Victor Amadeus Ferrero Fieschi, Prince of Masserano	1687	1743	
1709	Marcello de Ceva Grimaldi	1652	1725	
1709	Jacques Antoine de Bauffremont	c. 1682	1710	
1709	Michel Joseph, duc de Bournonville Michel Joseph, Duke of Bournonville	1672	1752	
1709	Giosia Acquaviva d'Aragona, 16th Duke of Atri	1680	1710	
1710	Jacques Bazin, Count of Bezons	1645	1733	
1710	Domenico Acquaviva d'Aragona, 17th Duke of Atri	1689	1745	
1711	Anne Auguste de Montmorency, Prince of Robecq	1680	1745	
1711	Louis Bénigne, Marquis of Bauffremont and Prince de Listenois	1684	1755	
1711	Jean Louis, Marquis of Arpajon	1669	1750	
1712	Jean Baptiste Ducasse	1646	1715	
1712	Procope Charles Nicolas Augustin Pignatelli, Count of Egmont and Prince of Gavre	1703	1743	
1713	Louis, Marquis of Brancas and Prince of Nisaro	1672	1750	
1713	Louis Hector, Marquis later Duke of Villars	1653	1734	
1713	Cristóbal Gregorio Portocarrero, 5th Count of Montijo	1692	1763	
1714	Restaino Cantelmo Stuart, 8th Duke of Popoli and Prince of Pettorano	1655	1723	
1714	James Francis Fitz-James Stuart, 2nd Duke of Berwick, Liria and Jérica	1696	1738	son of James FitzJames, 1st Duke of Berwick
1714	Louis Pierre Maximilien de Béthune, duc de Sully	1685	1761	
1715	Francis Immanuel Ignatius, Prince of Nassau-Siegen	1678	1735	
1715	Louis Henri d'Harcourt, Count (later Marquis) of Beuvron	1692	1716	son of Henry d'Harcourt
1715	Claude Francis Bidal, Marquis of Asfeld	1667	1743	
1716	Claude Abraham de Tubières de Grimoard de Pestel de Lévis, Duke of Caylus	c. 1672	1759	
1717	Louis, Prince of Asturias	1707	1724	later King Louis of Spain. Head of the order in 1724
1717	Lelio Carafa, Marquis of Arienzo	?	1762	
1717	Carlo Grillo	?	1724	son of Francesco Grillo, 1st Duke of Giugliano
1717	Stefano Mari Centurioni, Marquis of Mari	?	1749	
1721	Jean Baptiste Louis Andrault, Marquis of Maulévrier Langeron	1677	1754	
1721	Infante Manuel, Count of Ourém	1697	1766	
1722	Louis de Rouvroy, Duke of Saint-Simon	1675	1755	
1722	Philippe Charles, Marquis of La Fare	1687	1752	
1723	Infante Ferdinand of Spain	1713	1759	later King Ferdinand VI of Spain. Head of the order from 1746
1723	Infante Charles of Spain	1716	1788	later Duke Charles I of Parma, King Charles VII of the Two Sicilies and III of Spain. Head of the order from 1759
1723	Infante Philip of Spain	1720	1765	later Duke Philip of Parma
1724	Nicolás Fernández de Córdoba, 10th Duke of Medinaceli and Feria	1682	1739	
1724	Hyacinthe Boutin, Marquis of Valouse	1671	1736	
1724	Francesco Maria Pico, 3rd Duke of la Mirandola	1688	1747	
1724	Mercurio Antonio López Pacheco, 9th Marquis of Villena, 9th Duke of Escalona and Count of Santisteban de Gorma	1679	1738	
1724	Domingo María Carlos de Guzman el Bueno, 13th Duke of Medinasidonia	1691	1739	
1724	Antonio Arduino, Marqués de Sorito	?	1731	
1724	Alfonso Fernández Manrique de Lara, 1st Duke of Arco	1672	1737	
1724	José Grimaldi, Marquis of Grimaldi	1660	1733	
1724	Álvaro Benavides Bazán, 7th Marquis of Santa Cruz	1673	1737	
1724	Annibal, Marquis of Scotti	?	1752	
1724	Louis d'Orléans, Duke of Orléans	1703	1752	
1724	Louis Henri, Duke of Bourbon, Enghien and Prince of Condé	1692	1740	
1725	René de Froulay Count de Tessé	1650	1725	
1727	Francesco de Evoli, Duke of Castropignano	?	1758	
1728	Rodrigo Ignacio de Saa Almeida y Meneses, 7th Count of Penaguiaon	1676	1733	
1732	José Carrillo de Albornoz, Count (later Duke) of Montemar	1671	1747	
1732	José Patiño	1666	1736	
1734	Marie François Henri de Franquetot, Count of Coigny	1670	1759	
1735	Infante Louis Antonio of Spain	1727	1785	Cardinal Archbishop of Toledo and Seville, later Count of Chinchón
1736	Gaetano Boncompagni Ludovisi, 6th Duke of Sora and Prince of Piombino	1706	1777	
1736	Honoré Armand, Duke of Villars and Prince of Martigues	1702	1770	
1737	Ambrose Spinola de la Cerda y Colonna, 5th Marquis of los Balbases and Duke of Sesto	1696	1757	
1737	Michele Reggio Branciforte	1682	1772	
1737	José Armendáriz, 1st Marquis of Castelfuerte	1665	1749	
1738	Pedro Cebrián, Count of Fuenclara	1687	1752	
1738	Jaime Miguel de Guzmán de Avalos y Spinola, Marquis of la Mina, Duke of Palata and Prince of Masa	1691	1767	
1738	Giuseppe Sforza Cesarini Savelli, Duke of Sforza Cesarini, Count of Chinchon and Duke of Segni	1705	1744	
1738	Nicola Sangro, Marchese di San Lucido	1678	1750	
1738	Louis Jean Marie, Duke of Penthièvre	1725	1793	
1738	Andrés López Pacheco, 10th Marquis of Villena and 10th Duke of Escalona	1710	1746	
1738	Albert, Duke of Saxe-Teschen	1738	1822	
1739	Louis XV, King of France	1710	1774	
1739	Louis, Dauphin of France	1729	1765	
1739	Louis Pierre Engelbert, Count of la Marck	1674	1750	
1739	Marino Francesco Carriciolo, 7th Prince of Avellino	1714	1773	
1740	Count Stanislas Jablonowski	1692	1754	
1742	Maximilian III, Duke and Elector of Bavaria	1727	1747	
1742	Charles Louis César Auguste Fouquet, Duke of Belle-Isle	1684	1761	
1743	Melchor de Solis y Gante, Duke of Astrito and Marquis of Valladares	?	1752	
1745	Jean Bonaventure Dumont, Count of Gages	1682	1753	
1745	Domenico Marzio Carafa, 9th Duke of Maddaloni and Prince of la Guardia	1672	1750	
1745	Louis de Brancas, Duke of Lauraguais	1714	1793	
1746	Fernando de Silva Mendoza y Toledo, 12th Duke of Alba	1714	1776	
1746	Philippe de Noailles, Duke of Mouchy and Prince of Poix	1715	1794	
1746	Sebastián Antonio de Guzmán y Spinola Enríquez Colonna, 5th Marquis of Montealegre	1683	1757	
1746	Francisco Fernández de la Cueva y de la Cerda, 11th Duke of Alburquerque	1692	1757	
1747	Infante Philip, Duke of Calabria	1747	1777	son of King Charles VII of the Two Sicilies (later Charles III of Spain) excluded from succession to the throne due to his imbecility.
1748	Luis Antonio Fernández de Córdoba Spinola y la Cerda, 10th Marquis of Priego, Duke of Medinaceli and Feria	1704	1768	
1749	Infante Charles of Spain	1748	1819	later King Charles IV of Spain. Head of the Order from 1788 to 1808
1749	Clement, Duke of Bavaria and Count Palatine	1722	1770	
1750	Luca Spinola y Spinola, Count of Siruela	1680	1750	
1750	Zenón de Somodevilla y Bengoechea, Marquis of Ensenada	1702	1781	
1750	Fadrique Vicente Álvarez de Toledo Osorio y Pimentel, 9th Marquis of Villafranca del Bierzo, Duke of Fernandina and Montalto, Prince of Paternò	1686	1753	
1750	Jose de Carvajal y Láncaster	1698	1754	
1750	Joaquín Diego López de Zuñiga, 12th Duke of Béjar and Marquis of Gibraleón	1715	1777	
1751	Ferdinand, Prince of Parma	1751	1802	later Duke of Parma
1751	Infante Ferdinand of Spain	1751	1725	later King Ferdinand I of the Two Sicilies (IV of Naples and III of Sicily)
1752	Infante Gabriel of Spain	1752	1788	son of King Charles VII of the Two Sicilies (later Charles III of Spain)
1752	Louis Philippe, Duke of Chartres	1725	1785	later Duke Louis Philippe I of Orléans
1752	Victor Philip Ferrero Fieschi, Prince of Masserano	1713	1777	
1752	Francis Gonzague Pico de la Mirandola y Este, Prince of Mantua	1684	1758	
1752	Domingo Cattaneo della Volta, Prince of San Nicandro and Duke of Termoli	1697	1782	
1753	François Jose de Bournonville, Duke of Bournonville	1710	1769	
1753	Antonio Álvarez de Toledo, 10th Marquis of Villafranca, Duke of Fernandina and Montalto	1716	1773	
1753	Pedro de Alcántara Alonso Pérez de Guzmán el Bueno, 14th Duke of Medinasidonia and 17th Count of Niebla	1724	1777	
1754	Louis, Duke of Burgundy	1751	1761	son of Louis, Dauphin of France
1755	Lorenzo Colonna, 9th Prince of Paliano and Tagliacozzo, Prince of Castiglione	1723	1779	
1756	Infante Anthony of Spain	1755	1817	son of King Charles VII of the Two Sicilies (later Charles III of Spain)
1756	Pedro Pablo Abarca de Bolea, 10th Count of Aranda	1718	1798	
1757	Infante Francisco Javier of Spain	1757	1771	son of King Charles III of Spain;
1758	José Maria de Guzmán Guevara, 6th Marquis of Montealegre and 13th Count of Oñate	1709	1781	
1761	Louis, Duke of Berry	1754	1793	later King Louis XVI of France
1761	Charles Philip, Count of Artois	1757	1836	later King Charles X of France
1761	Joaquin Anastase Pignatelli d'Aragona, 16th Count of Fuentes, 2nd Duke of Solferino	1724	1776	
1761	Etienne François, Duke of Choiseul	1719	1785	
1762	Nicolás de Carvajal, Marquis of Sarria	1696	1770	
1764	José Fernández de Miranda, 1st Duke of Losada	1706	1783	
1764	Luis Manuel Laso de la Vega, Marquis of Miranda and Duke of Arco	?	1768	
1764	Antonio de Venavides y de la Cueva, Duke of Santisteban	1726	1782	
1764	Antonio Ponce de León y Spinola la Cerda, 11th Duke of Arcos and Najera	1726	1780	
1765	Paolo Jeronimo Grimaldi Pallavicini, Duke of Grimaldi	1710	1789	
1765	John Clement, Count of Branicki	1689	1771	
1767	Casimir Pignatelli, Count of Egmont and Prince of Gavre	1727	1801	
1767	Jean Juste Ferdinand, Prince of Croy-Havré and Count of Priego	1716	1790	
1767	Jose Bonano Filangieri del Bosco, Prince of Rocafiorita and Cattolica	?	?	
1767	Louis, Count of Provence	1755	1824	later King Louis XVIII of France
1768	Joaquín Manrique de Zuñiga, Count of Baños and Marquis of Leyva	?	1783	
1770	Michele Imperiali Simeana, Prince of Francavilla	1719	1782	
1771	Infante Charles Clement of Spain	1771	1774	son of Charles, Prince of Asturias (Charles IV of Spain)
1771	Alonso Vicente de Solís Folch de Cardona, Duke of Montellano	1708	1780	
1771	José Joaquín de Silva Bazán y Sarmiento, 9th Marquis of Santa Cruz	1734	1802	
1772	Pedro de Alcántara Fernández de Córdoba, 12th Duke of Medinaceli	1730	1789	
1772	Ventura Osorio de Moscoso y Guzmán, 14th Marquis of Astorga and Duke of Sesa	1732	1776	
1772	Andrés Téllez Girón, Duke of Uceda	1728	1780	
1772	Emmanuel Félicité, Count of Durfort and Duke of Duras	1715	1789	
1772	Joaquín Antonio de Palafox y Rebolledo, 6th Marquis of Ariza	1702	1775	
1773	Louis, Prince of Parma,	1773	1803	later King of Etruria
1775	Prince Carlo Tito of Naples	1775	1778	son of King Ferdinand I of the Two Sicilies
1777	Prince Francis of Naples	1777	1830	later King Francis I of the Two-Sicilies
1779	Infante Carlos Eusebio of Spain	1779	1783	son of Charles, Prince of Asturias (Charles IV of Spain)
1779	Bartolomeo de Capua, 20th Count of Altavilla, Duke of Airola, Prince of Riccia	?	?	
1779	Pedro Téllez Girón, 8th Duke of Osuna	1728	1787	
1779	Pascual Benito Belvis de Moncada, 3rd Marquis of Belgida and San Juan de Piedras Albos	1727	1781	
1779	Vicente Manrique de Zúñiga, Marquis of Aguilafuente and Count of Aguilar	?	?	
1779	Pedro de Alcántara Fadrique Fernández de Híjar, 10th Duke of Híjar	?	1794	
1779	Diego Ventura de Guzmán Fernández de Córdoba, 7th Marquis of Montealegre and Duke of Najera	1738	1805	
1779	Fausto Francisco de Palafox y Rebolledo, 7th Marquis of Ariza	1731	1788	
1779	Jean Louis Paul de Noailles, Count of Ayen	1739	1824	later Duke of Ayen
1780	Marquis Pierre Paul d'Ossun	1713	1788	French Ambassador to Spain
1780	Filippo Colonna, 10 Duke of Paliano	1760	1818	
1780	Prince Carlo Gennaro of Naples	1780	1789	son of King Ferdinand I of the Two Sicilies
1781	Prince Giuseppe of Naples	1781	1783	son of King Ferdinand I of the Two Sicilies
1783	Carlos José Gutiérrez de los Ríos, 6th Count of Fernan Nuñez	1742	1795	
1783	Armand Marc, Count of Montmorin de Saint-Herem	1745	1794	
1783	Philip, Prince of Parma	1783	1786	son of Ferdinand, Duke of Parma
1783	Louis Pierre Nolasque Berton des Balbes, Marquis of Crillon	1717	1796	
1783	Infante Charles Francis of Spain	1783	1784	son of Charles, Prince of Asturias (Charles IV of Spain)
1783	Infante Philip Francis of Spain	1783	1784	son of Charles, Prince of Asturias (Charles IV of Spain)
1784	Infante Ferdinand of Spain	1784	1833	later King Ferdinand VII of Spain. Head of the order from 1808
1785	José, Prince of Brazil	1761	1788	son of Queen Maria I of Portugal
1785	Infante John of Portugal	1769	1826	later King John VI of Portugal
1785	Henri de Meneses, Count of Ericeyra and Marquis de Lourizal	1727	1787	Ambassador of Portugal to Spain
1785	Philippe Louis Marc de Noailles, Prince of Poix	1752	1819	
1786	Infante Peter Charles Anthony of Spain	1786	1812	son of Infante Gabriel of Spain
1788	Infante Carlos of Spain	1775	1855	First Carlist Claimant to the Throne of Spain
1788	Prince Carlo Gennaro	1788	1789	son of King Ferdinand I of the Two Sicilies
1789	Infante Charles John of Spain	1788	1789	son of Gabriel de Borbón
1789	Felipe López Pacheco de la Cueva, 10th Marquis de Villena, Moya and 12th Duke of Escalona	1727	1798	
1789	Salatore Montaperto Uberti Branciforte, Prince of Raffadali	?	1801	
1789	Manuel José Pacheco Téllez Girón y Toledo	1732	1794	
1789	Cristobal Pío Funes de Villapandro, Count of Atares	?	1791	
1789	Pedro Francisco Lujan Silva, Duke of Almodóvar	1727	1789	
1789	Judas Tadeo Fernández de Miranda, 5th Marquis of Valdecarzana	1739	1810	
1789	Juan de Silva Rabatta, 14th Count of Cifuentes	?	1792	
1789	Paul François de Quélen, Prince of Carency and Duke of Vauguyon	1746	1728	
1789	Luis María Fernández de Córdoba, Duke of Santisteban, 13th Duke of Medinaceli	1749	1806	
1789	Vicente Joaquín Osorio de Moscoso, 15th Marquis of Astorga, 11th Count of Altamira, Prince of Aracena and Duke of Sesa	1756	1816	
1789	Juan Pablo de Aragón Azlor y Zapata de Calatayud, 11th Duke of Villahermosa, Duke of Palata and Count of Real	1730	1790	
1789	Louis Henri, Duke of Bourbon	1756	1830	
1789	Charles Roger, Prince of Bauffremont-Listenois	1713	1795	
1789	Andrea IV Doria-Pamphili-Landi, Marquis of Torriglia and Melfi	1747	1820	
1789	Miguel José de la Cueva Velasco, 13th Duke of Alburquerque and 4th Marquis of Mina	1743	1803	
1790	Diego Fernández de Velasco, 13th Duke of Frías and Uceda, Count of Alba and Lista	1754	1811	
1790	Diego de Noronha	1747	1806	Ambassador of Portugal to Spain
1790	Joseph Anne Auguste, Duke of Croy-Havré	1744	1839	
1791	Francesco Augusto Cattaneo, Duke of Termoli and 4th Prince of San Nicandro	1721	1791	
1791	José Álvarez de Toledo, Duke of Alba, 15th Duke of Medina Sidonia, 11th Duke of Montalto, 10th Duke of Bivona, 8th Duke of Fernandina	1756	1796	
1791	José Monino, Count of Floridablanca	1728	1808	
1791	Augusto Cattaneo, Duke of Termoli and 5th Prince of San Nicandro	1754	1824	
1791	Infante Philip Maria of Spain	1792	1794	son of King Charles IV of Spain
1792	Maximilian, Hereditary Prince of Saxony	1759	1838	
1792	Manuel de Godoy, Prince of the Peace	1767	1851	
1794	Infante Francisco de Paula of Spain	1794	1865	son of King Charles IV of Spain
1794	Carlo Sebastiano Ferrero Fieschi, Prince of Masserano	1760	1826	
1794	Vicente María de Palafox, 8th Marquis of Ariza	1756	1820	
1794	Vicenzo Maria de Vera Aragon, Duke of la Rocca	1731	1813	
1794	Francisco María del Castillo Horcasitas, Marquis of Villadarias	1742	1798	
1794	Pedro Téllez-Girón, 9th Duke of Osuna	1755	1807	
1794	Pablo de Sangro, Prince of Castelfranco	1760	1826	
1795	Juan Vicente María Imperiali y Centurión, 8th Marquis of Oyra	1738	1816	
1795	Miguel de la Grúa Talamanca, 1st Marquis of Branciforte	?	?	
1795	Francis Anthony Pius, Prince of Beira	1795	1801	son of King John VI of Portugal
1796	Luis Pinto de Sousa	?	?	
1796	Antonio de Valdés y Fernández de Bazán	1744	1816	
1798	Bruno Domingo Simon, Count of Lalaing	1739	?	
1799	Juan Manuel Álvarez de Faria y Sánchez de Zarzosa	1794	1865	
1799	Charles, Prince of Parma	1760	1826	later King of Etruria, Duke of Lucca and Parma

=== 19th century ===
Year of induction	Name	Born	Died	Notes
1801	Peter of Portugal, Prince of Beira	1798	1834	later Emperor Peter I of Brazil and King Peter IV of Portugal
1802	Prince Leopoldo Giovanni of the Two Siciles	1790	1851	son of King Ferdinand I of the Two Sicilies
1802	Sir John Acton, Bt.	1736	1811	
1802	Carlo Maria Caracciolo, Duke of San Teodoro	1764	1823	
1804	Infant Miguel of Portugal	1802	1866	later King Miguel of Portugal
1805	Napoleon I, Emperor of the French	1769	1821	
1805	Joseph Bonaparte	1768	1844	later King of Naples and Spain
1805	Louis Bonaparte	1778	1846	later King of Holland
1805	Felice Baciocchi, Prince of Lucca and Piombino	1762	1841	
1805	Camillo Borghese, Prince of Sulmona and Rossano	1775	1832	
1805	Joseph, Cardinal Fesch	1763	1839	
1805	Joachim Murat	1767	1815	later King of Naples
1805	Eugène de Beauharnais	1781	1824	Viceroy of Italy
1812	Arthur Wellesley, 1st Duke of Wellington, Prince of Waterloo, Duke of Ciudad Rodrigo and Marquis of Vimeiro	1769	1852	
1814	José Miguel de Carvajal, 2nd Duke of San Carlos	1771	1828	
1814	Alexander I, Emperor of Russia	1777	1825	
1814	Frederick William III, King of Prussia	1770	1840	
1814	George, Prince of Wales	1762	1830	Prince Regent of United Kingdom, later King George IV of the United Kingdom and Hanover
1814	Charles Maurice de Talleyrand-Périgord, Prince of Talleyrand and Benevente	1754	1838	
1814	William, Hereditary Prince of Orange	1792	1849	later King William II of the Netherlands
1814	Louis Antoine, Duke of Angoulême	1775	1844	
1814	Charles Ferdinand, Duke of Berry	1778	1820	
1814	Charles XIII, King of Sweden	1748	1818	
1814	Carlos Gutiérrez de los Ríos Fernández de Córdoba, Count (later Duke) of Fernan-Nuñez and Montellano	1779	1822	
1816	Pedro Cevallos	1764	1840	
1816	Dmitriy Tatistcheff	1767	1845	Russian diplomat
1816	William I, King of the Netherlands	1772	1843	
1816	Juan de la Cruz Belvis de Moncada, Marquis of Belgida	1756	1835	
1816	Pedro de Alcántara Álvarez de Toledo, Count of Miranda and Duke Peneranda	1765	1824	
1816	Ignacio de Arteaga e Idiáquez, Marquis of Valmediano	1748	1817	
1816	Francisco de Meneses Silveira y Castro, Marquis of Valada	1754	1834	
1816	Francisco de Paula Fernández de Córdoba, 18th Count of la Puebla del Maestre	1763	1824	
1816	Nicola Caetano Jose Centurioni e Vera, Marquis of la Lapilla	1761	1834	
1816	Francisco de Borja Idiaquez de Palafox, Duke of Granada and Ega	1755	1817	
1816	Pedro de Alcántara de Toledo, 13th Duke of Infantado	1773	1841	
1816	Joaquín Antonio Samaniego, Count of Torrejón and Marquis of Valverde	1769	1844	
1817	Constantine, Tsesarevich and Grand Duke of Russia	1779	1831	
1817	Grand Duke Nicholas Pavlovich of Russia	1796	1855	later Emperor Nicholas I of Russia
1817	Grand Duke Michael Pavlovich of Russia	1798	1849	son of Emperor Paul I of Russia
1817	Antonio María Ponce de León, Duke of Montemar	1757	1826	
1817	Augustin Pedro González Telmo Fernández de Híjar, Duke of Híjar	1773	1817	
1817	Antonio Rocaberti de Dameto, Count of Peralada and Viscount of Rocaberti	1782	1825	
1818	Infante Carlos Luis of Spain	1818	1861	Second Carlist Claimant to the throne of Spain, Count of Montemolin
1818	Frederick William, Prince of Prussia	1795	1861	later King Frederick William IV of Prussia
1818	Frederick VI, King of Denmark	1786	1839	
1818	Ramón San Martín, Marquis of San Martin	1764	1826	
1819	Antoine Claude de Noailles, Duke of Mouchy	1777	1846	
1819	Fulco Ruffo di Calabria, 8th Prince of Scilla	1773	1852	
1819	Tommaso Maria di Somma, 9th Marquis of Circello	1737	1826	
1819	Frederick Augustus I, King of Saxony	1750	1827	
1819	Francisco Ramón de Spes Fernández de Córdoba, Duke of Alagón	1758	1841	
1819	Valentín Carlos, Marquis de Villanueva del Duero, Count of Villariezo	1762	1823	
1820	Infante Francis of Spain	1820	1821	son of Infante Francisco de Paula of Spain
1820	Luis María de Borbón y Vallabriga, 14th Count of Chinchón	1777	1823	Archbishop of Seville and Toledo, Cardinal.
1821	José Gabriel Bazán de Silva, 10th Marquis of Santa Cruz	1782	1839	
1821	Ferdinand, Duke of Noto	1810	1859	later Ferdinand II of the Two-Siciles
1821	Anne Pierre, Prince of Montmorency-Laval	1768	1837	
1822	Infante Francis of Spain	1822	1902	Duke of Cádiz, later King Consort of Spain
1822	Infante Juan Carlos of Spain	1822	1887	son of Infante Carlos of Spain, the first Carlist Claimant
1822	Charles XIV John, King of Sweden	1764	1844	
1823	Ferdinand Charles, Prince of Lucca	1823	1854	later Duke Charles III of Parma
1823	Infante Enrique of Spain	1823	1870	son of the Infante Francisco de Paula, youngest son of King Charles IV of Spain. Later Duke of Seville
1823	Joaquín José Melgarejo de Ruiz Dávalos, Duke of San Fernando	1780	1835	
1823	Charles Albert, Prince of Savoy-Carignan	1798	1849	later King of Sardinia
1823	Louis Justin, marquis de Talaru	1773	1850	French Ambassador to Spain
1823	Infante Sebastian of Spain	1811	1875	son of Teresa, Princess of Beira and Infante Pedro Carlos of Spain
1823	Carlo Andrea Pozzo di Borgo	1764	1842	Russian diplomat
1823	Henri, Duke of Bordeaux	1820	1883	later the French legitimist pretender, count of Chambord
1823	Jean Baptiste Guillaume, Count of Villèle	1773	1854	
1823	François, Viscount of Chateaubriand	1768	1848	
1824	Pedro de Sousa Holstein, Duke of Palmella	1781	1850	
1824	Charles Robert, Count of Nesselrode	1780	1862	the Russian foreign minister
1824	Christian Gunther, Count of Bernstorff	1769	1835	
1824	Infante Ferdinand of Spain	1824	1861	son of the Infante Carlos of Spain, the first Carlist Claimant
1824	Paul, Duke of Noailles and Ayen	1802	1885	
1825	Prince John of Saxony	1801	1873	later King John I of Saxony
1826	Infante Edward Philip of Spain	1826	1830	
1826	Charles, Prince of Capua	1811	1862	son of King Francis I of the Two-Sicilies
1826	Leopold, Count of Syracuse	1813	1860	son of King Francis I of the Two-Sicilies
1826	Grand Duke Alexander Nikolayevich of Russia	1818	1881	later Emperor Alexander II of Russia
1826	Antonio, Count of Lecce	1814	1843	son of King Francis I of the Two-Sicilies
1827	José Antonio Aragon y Azlor, 12th Duke of Villahermosa, Duke of Palata and Count of Real	1785	1852	
1829	Vicenze Maria Grifeo, Duke of Floridia, Prince of Partanna	?	?	
1829	Luigi de' Medici dei Principi de Ottajano	1760	1830	
1829	Donato, Marquis Tommasi and Casaliecho	1761	1831	
1829	Pedro Gómez Labrador, Marquis of Labrador	1755	1852	
1829	José Rafael Fadrique Fernández de Híjar, 13th Duke of Híjar	?	1863	
1829	Francisco Castaños, 1st Duke of Bailén	1758	1852	
1829	Francisco Tadeo Calomarde, Duke of Santa Isabel	1773	1842	
1830	Auguste Pierre, Count of La Ferronays	1777	1842	
1830	Louis, Duke of Aquila	1824	1897	
1830	Francis, Count of Trapani	1827	1892	
1832	Girolamo, Marquis Ruffo	?	?	
1832	Prudencio de Guadalfajara, Duke of Castroterrano	1761	1855	
1834	William IV, King of the United Kingdom and Hanover	1765	1837	
1834	Louis Philippe I, King of the French	1775	1850	
1835	Leopold I, King of the Belgians	1790	1865	
1835	Augustus, Prince of Leuchtenberg	1810	1835	1st husband of Queen Maria II of Portugal
1835	Pedro II, Emperor of Brazil	1825	1891	
1835	Otto, King of the Hellenes	1815	1867	
1835	Bernardino José López Pacheco, 14th Duke of Frías	1783	1851	
1835	Ferdinand Philippe, Duke of Orléans and Prince Royal of France	1810	1842	
1837	Ferdinand II, King-consort of Portugal	1816	1885	2nd husband of Queen Maria II of Portugal
1838	Miguel Tacón, Duke of la Unión and Cuba	1775	1855	
1838	Fernando de Aguillara, Marquis of Cerralbo	1784	1838	
1838	Napoléon Louis de Talleyrand-Périgord, Duke of Valençay	1811	1898	
1838	Juan Baptista de Queralt y Silva, Count of Santa Coloma	1786	1865	
1838	Nicolas Jean de Dieu Soult	1769	1851	
1838	Manuel Pando Fernandez de Pinedo, 2nd Marquis of Miraflores	1792	1872	
1840	Christian VIII, King of Denmark	1786	1848	
1840	Baldomero Espartero, Regent of Spain and Prince of Vergara	1793	1879	
1841	Prince Albert of Saxe-Coburg and Gotha, Prince Consort of the United Kingdom	1819	1861	
1842	William Alexander, Prince of Orange	1817	1890	later King William III of the Netherlands
1843	Salustiano de Olózaga	1803	1873	
1843	Louis, Duke of Nemours	1814	1896	second son of the King Louis Philippe of the French
1843	Diego Isidro Guzmán de la Cerda, 8th Marquis of Montealegre, Duke of Nájera	1776	1849	
1844	François Guizot	1787	1874	Prime Minister of France
1844	Oscar I, King of Sweden	1799	1859	
1844	Francis, Duke of Calabria	1836	1894	later King Francis II of the Two Sicilies
1845	Henri, Duke of Aumale	1822	1897	
1846	Eugène Lamoral, Prince of Ligne	1804	1880	
1846	Agustín Fernando Muñoz, Duke of Riánsares	1808	1873	
1846	Prince Antoine, Duke of Montpensier	1824	1890	youngest son of the King Louis Philippe of the French; husband of the Infanta Luisa, sister of Queen Isabella II of Spain
1846	François, Prince of Joinville	1818	1900	
1846	Pedro, Crown Prince of Portugal	1837	1861	later King Pedro V of Portugal
1847	Ramón María Narváez y Campos, 1st Duke of Valencia	1800	1868	
1847	José María Osorio de Mosco de Carvajal, 17th Duke of Sessa, 19th Duke of Trastamara and 14th Count of Altamira	1828	1881	
1848	Frederick VII, King of Denmark	1808	1863	
1849	Juan Roca de Togores, 3rd Count of Pinohermoso	1801	1883	
1850	Louis Napoleon Bonaparte, President of the French Republic	1808	1873	later Napoleon III, Emperor of the French. Co-Prince of Andorra.
1851	Francisco Martínez de la Rosa	1787	1862	
1851	Joaquín Fernández de Córdoba, 6th Duke of Arion	1787	1871	
1852	Francisco Javier de Istúriz	1790	1871	
1852	Nicolás de Osorio y Zayas, 16th Marquis of Alcañices, 15th Duke of Albuquerque and 15th Duke of Ledesma	1793	1866	
1852	Juan Bravo Murillo	1803	1873	
1852	Albert Edward, Prince of Wales	1841	1910	later King Edward VII of the United Kingdom, Emperor of India
1852	Louis, Count of Trani	1838	1886	
1852	Charles Louis, Count of Ficquelmont and of the Holy Roman Empire	1777	1857	heir from a prominent noble family from Lorraine, former imperial ambassador and former minister-president of the Austrian Empire
1853	William, Prince of Prussia	1797	1888	later King William I of Prussia and German Emperor
1854	Robert, Duke of Parma	1848	1907	
1855	Charles, Crown Prince of Sweden	1826	1872	later King Charles XV of Sweden
1856	Juan Carlos Francisco, Duke of Saldaña	1791	1876	
1856	Napoleon, Prince Imperial	1856	1879	son of Emperor Napoleon III of France
1856	Prince Adalbert of Bavaria	1828	1875	son of King Louis I of Bavaria
1857	Nicholas, Tsarevich and Grand Duke of Russia	1843	1865	
1857	Alexander, Prince Gorchakov	1798	1883	Foreign Minister of Russia
1857	Alfonso, Prince of the Asturias	1857	1885	later King Alfonso XII of Spain. Head of the Order from 1870/1874
1859	Infante Ferdinand of Spain	1859	1872	nephew of Queen Isabella II of Spain
1859	Prince Ludwig Ferdinand of Bavaria	1859	1949	
1860	Antonio Remón Zarco del Valle y Huet	1785	1866	
1860	Mariano Téllez Girón, 12th Duke of Osuna and Infantado	1814	1882	
1861	Luís I, King of Portugal	1838	1889	
1862	Frederick, Crown Prince of Prussia	1831	1888	later German Emperor Frederick III
1862	Francisco of Spain, Duke of Marchena	1861	1923	
1863	Louis III, Grand Duke of Hesse	1806	1877	
1863	William Nicholas, Prince of Orange and Crown Prince of the Netherlands	1840	1879	
1864	Christian IX, King of Denmark	1818	1906	
1865	Pedro José Pidal, 1st Marquis of Pidal	1800	1865	
1865	Ángel Ramírez de Bapredano, 3rd Duke of Rivas	1791	1865	
1865	Luis Tomas Fernández de Córdoba, 15th Duke of Medinaceli	1813	1873	
1866	George V, King of Hanover	1819	1878	
1866	Prince Friedrich Karl of Prussia	1801	1883	
1866	Alexander, Tsarevich and Grand Duke of Russia	1845	1894	later Emperor Alexander III of Russia
1866	Leopold Ferdinand, Count of Hainaut	1859	1869	son of King Leopold II of the Belgians
1866	Francisco Serrano y Domínguez, Duke de la Torre	1810	1885	
1866	Pedro Colón, Duke of Veragua	?	?	
1866	Fernando Díaz de Mendoza y Valcárcel, Count of Lalaing de Balazote	1810	1884	
1866	Carlos, Crown Prince of Portugal	1863	1908	later King Carlos of Portugal
1867	Luis González Bravo	1811	1871	
1868	Gaetano, Count of Girgenti	1846	1871	Son-in-law of Queen Isabella II of Spain
1868	Manuel Seijas Lozano	1800	1868	
1868	Lorenzo Arrazola	1797	1873	
1868	Francisco Javier Arias Dávila Matheu, Count of Punonrostro	1812	1890	
1870	Pedro Gómez de la Serna	1806	1871	
1870	Casimiro Vigodet y Guernica	1787	1872	
1870	Abdulaziz (عبد العزيز), Sultan of the Ottoman Empire	1830	1876	
1870	Muhammad III as-Sadiq (محمد الصادق بن حسين), Bey of Tunis	1813	1882	
1870	Amadeo I, King of Spain	1845	1890	
1871	Eugenio Emanuele Prince of Savoy-Carignan	1816	1888	
1871	Adolphe Thiers, President of the French Republic	1797	1877	Co-Prince of Andorra
1871	George I, King of the Hellenes	1845	1913	
1871	Frederick Charles, Prince of Prussia	1828	1885	
1872	Prince Philippe, Count of Flanders	1837	1905	son of King Leopold I of the Belgians
1872	Manuel Falcó de Adda, 3rd Duke of Fernan-Nuñez and Arco	1856	1927	
1872	Cirilo Álvarez Martínez de Velasco	1807	1878	President of the Supreme Court of Spain
1872	Antonio de los Ríos y Rosas	1812	1873	
1872	Oscar II, King of Sweden	1829	1907	
1875	Juan Manuel González de la Pezuela, Count of Cheste	1809	1906	
1875	José Osorio y Silva, Marquis of Alcañices, Sexto and Alburquerque	1825	1910	
1875	Alejandro Mon y Martínez	1801	1882	
1875	Mariano Roca de Togores, Marquis de Molins, Viscount of Rocamora	1812	1889	
1875	Manuel Pavia y Lacy, 1st Marquis de Novaliches	1814	1896	
1875	Patrice MacMahon, President of the French Republic	1808	1893	Duke of Magenta and Marshal of France. Co-Prince of Andorra
1875	Otto von Bismarck, Prince of Bismarck	1815	1898	Minister-President of Prussia and Chancellor of German Empire
1875	Charles Alexander, Grand Duke of Saxe-Weimar-Eisenach	1818	1901	
1875	Cardinal James Santiago Antonelli	1806	1876	
1875	Alexander, Count of Adlerberg	1818	1884	
1875	Wilhelm, Prince of Prussia	1859	1941	later German Emperor Wilhelm II
1875	Antonio Cánovas del Castillo	1828	1897	
1877	Francisco de Borja Bazán de Silva, 11th Marquis of Santa Cruz	1815	1889	
1878	Francisco Santa Cruz y Pacheco	1797	1883	
1878	Juan Zavala y de la Puente, Marquis of Sierra Bullones	1804	1879	
1878	Manuel García, Marquis of Barzanallana	1817	1892	
1878	Frederick I, Grand Duke of Baden	1826	1907	
1878	Arsenio Martínez Campos	1831	1900	
1878	Victor Emmanuel, Prince of Italy	1869	1947	later King Victor Emmanuel III of Italy
1879	Antonio Maria Fontes Pereria de Mello	1819	1887	
1880	Abdul Hamid II (عبد الحميد ثانی), Sultan of the Ottoman Empire	1842	1918	
1880	Antonio d'Orléans, Infant of Spain, Duke of Galliera	1866	1930	brother-in-law of King Alfonso XII of Spain
1881	Gaston d'Orléans, Count of Eu	1842	1922	
1881	Manuel Lorenzo Antonio de Acuna y Dewite, Marquis of Bedmar	1821	1883	
1881	Gustaf, Crown Prince of Sweden	1858	1950	later King Gustaf V of Sweden
1882	Jules Grévy, President of the French Republic	1807	1891	Co-Prince of Andorra
1883	Nicholas, Tsarevitch and Grand Duke of Russia	1868	1918	later Emperor Nicholas II of Russia
1883	Frederik, Crown Prince of Denmark	1843	1912	later King Frederik VIII of Denmark
1883	Prince Heinrich of Prussia	1862	1929	
1883	Emperor Meiji of Japan (明治天皇)	1852	1912	Mutsuhito (personal name)
1883	Infante Alfonso of Portugal, Duke of Porto	1865	1920	
1884	José Posada Herrera	1815	1885	
1884	Fernando Calderón de la Barca y Collantes, Marquis of Reinosa	1811	1890	
1884	Rafael de Bustos et Castillo, Marquis of Corvera	1807	1894	
1886	Alfonso XIII, King of Spain	1886	1941	posthumous son of Alfonso XII of Spain, King and Grand Master of the Order at his birth (nominal until 1902)
1886	Infante Augusto of Portugal, Duke of Coimbra	1847	1889	
1886	Cardinal Louis Jacobini	1832	1887	
1886	José Gutierrez de la Concha, 1st Marquis of La Habana	1809	1895	
1888	Thomas, 2nd Duke of Genoa	1854	1931	
1888	Charles I, King of Württemberg	1823	1891	
1888	Alfred, Duke of Edinburgh	1844	1900	
1889	Constantine, Crown Prince of Greece	1868	1923	later King Constantine I of the Hellenes
1890	José Joaquín Álvarez de Toledo, 18th Duke of Medina Sidonia	1826	1900	
1891	Práxedes Mateo Sagasta	1827	1903	
1891	Vladimir Alexandrovitch, Grand Duke of Russia	1847	1909	
1891	Albert, Prince of Prussia, Regent of the Duchy of Brunswick	1837	1906	
1892	William II, King of Württemberg	1848	1921	
1892	Cristóbal Colón de la Cerday Gante, Duke of Veragua and Marquis of Jamaica	1837	1910	
1892	Prince Luís Filipe of Portugal, Duke of Braganza	1887	1908	
1893	George, Prince of the United Kingdom and Duke of York	1865	1936	later King George V of the United Kingdom and British dominions beyond the seas, Emperor of India
1895	Guillermo Chacón y Maldonado	1813	1899	
1895	José Elduayen y Gorriti, Marquis of Pazo de la Merced	1823	1898	
1895	Eugenio Montero Ríos	1832	1914	
1896	George Alexandrovitch, Grand Duke of Russia	1871	1899	
1896	Yoshihito, Crown Prince of Japan (嘉仁)	1879	1926	later Emperor Taishō (大正天皇) of Japan
1897	Ferdinand, Duke of Calabria	1869	1960	
1898	Félix Faure, President of the French Republic	1841	1899	Co-Prince of Andorra
1900	Wilhelm, German Crown Prince	1882	1951	
1900	Enrique Ramírez de Saaveda y Cueto, 4th Duke of Rivas and Marquis de Andia	1828	1914	
1900	Carlos María Stuart Fitz James y Portocarrero, 9th Duke of Berwick and 16th Duke of Alba	1849	1901	
1900	Alejandro Llorente y Lamas	1814	1901	

=== 20th century ===
Year of induction	Name	Born	Died	Notes
1901	Charles of Bourbon-Sicily, Infante of Spain	1870	1949	husband of María de las Mercedes, Princess of Asturias
1901	Christian, Prince of Denmark	1870	1947	later King Christian X of Denmark
1901	Infante Alfonso of Spain, Duke of Calabria	1901	1964	son of Mercedes, Princess of Asturias
1901	Grand Duke Michael Alexandrovich of Russia	1878	1918	
1902	Carlos Martinez de Irujo, Duke of Sotomayor and Marquis of Casa-Irujo	1846	1909	
1902	Prince Eugén, Duke of Närke	1865	1947	
1902	Arthur William, Prince of the United Kingdom and Duke of Connaught and Strathearn	1850	1942	
1902	Vajiravudh, Crown Prince of Siam	1881	1925	later King Vajiravudh of Siam (พระบาทสมเด็จพระมงกุฎเกล้าเจ้าอยู่หัว) also known as Rama VI
1902	Émile Loubet, President of the French Republic	1838	1929	Co-Prince of Andorra. Invested by the Duke of Sesto, special representative, on 22 June 1902 at Paris.
1902	Ernest Augustus, Crown Prince of Hanover	1845	1923	
1902	Mozaffar al-Din (مظفرالدين شاه قاجار), Shah of Persia	1853	1907	
1903	Ferdinand Maria of the Two Siciles, Infante of Spain	1903	1905	son of Prince Carlos of Bourbon-Two Sicilies
1903	Carlos Valcárcel y Ussel de Guimbarda	1819	1903	
1903	Honorio de Samaniego y Pando, Conde de Villapaterna	1833	1917	
1903	Don Alejandro Pidal y Mon	1846	1913	
1903	Antonio de Aguilar y Correa, Marquis of la Vega de Armijo	1824	1908	
1903	Ernesto Rodolfo Hintze Ribeiro	1849	1907	
1904	Marcelo Azcárraga y Palmero	1832	1915	
1905	Ferdinand Maria, Prince of Bavaria and Infante of Spain	1884	1958	husband of Infanta Maria Teresa of Spain
1905	Bernard Henri, Prince of Bülow	1849	1929	
1906	Prince Alfons of Bavaria	1862	1933	
1907	Alfonso, Prince of Asturias	1907	1938	
1907	Alfonso Maria d'Orléans, Infante of Spain	1886	1975	
1908	Manuel II, King of Portugal	1889	1932	
1908	José López Domínguez	1829	1911	
1908	Fernando Primo de Rivera y Sobremonte, Marquis of Estrella	1831	1921	
1909	Adalbert, Prince of Bavaria	1886	1970	
1910	Gustav, Crown Prince of Sweden	1882	1973	later King Gustav VI of Sweden
1910	Haakon VII, King of Norway	1872	1957	
1910	Ernest Louis, Grand Duke of Hesse	1868	1937	
1910	Fernando León y Castillo, Marquis of the Muni	1842	1918	
1911	José Messía y Gayoso de los Cobos, 4th Duke of Tamames	1853	1917	
1911	Alejandro Groizard y Gómez de la Serna	1830	1919	
1911	Andrés Avelino Salabert Ortega, 8th Marquis of la Torrecilla	1864	1925	
1911	Manuel Aguirre de Tejada O'Neal y Eulato, 1st Count of Tejada de Valdeosera	1827	1911	
1911	José de Echegaray Eizaguire	1832	1916	
1912	Edward, Prince of Wales	1894	1972	later King Edward VIII of the United Kingdom and British dominions beyond the seas, Emperor of India (1936) and Duke of Windsor (from 1936)
1913	Raymond Poincaré, President of the French Republic	1860	1934	Co-Prince of Andorra
1913	Francisco Javier Azlor-Aragón e Idiaquez, Duke of Granada de Ega	1842	1919	
1913	Luis Pidal y Mon, 2nd Marquis of Pidal	1842	1913	
1913	Valeriano Weyler y Nicolay, Marquis of Tenerife and Duke of Rubi	1838	1930	
1914	Juan Bautista Viniegra y Mendoza	1842	1918	
1914	Manuel Falcó Osorio de Adda y Gutiérrez de los Ríos, Marquis of Mina and Duke of Fernán Nuñez	1856	1927	
1914	Claudio López y Bru, 2nd Marquis of Comillas	1853	1925	
1914	Philippe Emmanuel d'Orléans, Duke of Vendôme	1872	1931	
1914	Etienne, Prince of Croy-Solre	1872	1932	
1915	Fermín de Lasala y Collado, Duke of Mandas and Villanueva	1830	1917	
1916	Prince Filippo Maria of the Two Siciles	1847	1922	son of Prince Louis, Count of Aquila
1916	Joaquín Ignacio de Arteaga y Echagüe, 17th Duke of Infantado	1870	1948	
1919	Prince Gennaro of the Two Sicilies	1882	1944	son of Prince Alfonso, Count of Caserta
1919	Prince Ranieri of the Two Sicilies	1883	1973	later Head of the House of the Two Sicilies and Duke of Castro
1919	Alberto Manso de Velasco y Chaves, Count of Superunda	1834	1922	
1920	Antonio Maura y Montaner	1853	1925	
1920	Prince Gabriel of the Two Sicilies	1897	1975	son of Prince Alfonso, Count of Caserta
1921	Infante Jaime of Spain	1908	1974	later Duke of Segovia
1923	Leopold, Crown Prince of Belgium and Duke of Brabant	1901	1983	later King Leopold III of the Belgians (until 1951)
1923	Luis Alfonso of Bavaria, Infante of Spain	1906	1983	son of Infanta María Teresa of Spain
1923	Umberto, Prince of Piedmont	1904	1983	later King Umberto II of Italy
1924	Hendrik of Mecklenburg-Schwerin, Prince Consort of the Netherlands	1876	1934	
1924	José Eugenio of Bavaria, Infante of Spain	1909	1966	son of Infanta María Teresa of Spain
1925	Alberto Enrique María de Borbón y Castellví, 1st Duke of Santa Elena	1854	1939	son of Infante Enrique, Duke of Seville
1925	Galeazzo von Thun und Hohenstein, Grand Master of the Order of Malta	1850	1931	
1926	Jacobo Stuart Fitz-James y Falcó, 10th Duke of Berwick and 17th Duke of Alba	1878	1954	
1926	Gaston Doumergue, President of the French Republic	1863	1937	
1926	José de Saaverda et Salamanca, 2nd Marquis of Viana	1870	1927	
1927	Francisco de Paula de Borbón y Castellví	1853	1942	son of Infante Enrique, Duke of Seville
1927	Infante Juan of Spain	1913	1993	later Head of the Spanish Royal House and Claimant to the Throne (1941–1977), Count of Barcelona. Head of the Order from 1941 to 1977
1927	Infante Gonzalo of Spain	1914	1934	son of King Alfonso XIII of Spain
1927	Mariano de Silva y Carvajal Fernández de Córdoba y Salabert, 13th Marquis of Santa Cruz	1875	1940	
1928	Emperor Shōwa of Japan (昭和天皇)	1901	1989	Hirohito (personal name)
1929	Luis Jesús Fernández de Córdoba y Salabert, 17th Duke of Medinaceli	1880	1956	
1930	Ernest Louis Henry Lamoral, Prince of Ligne	1857	1937	
1931	Paul von Hindenburg, President of Germany	1847	1934	
1931	Carlos María Cortezo y Prieto	1850	1933	
1931	Juan Bautista Aznar Cabañas	1860	1933	
1931	Luis de Silva y Carvajal, Duke of Mircanda and Count of la Unión	1876	1935	
1941	Infante Juan Carlos of Spain	1938		later King Juan Carlos of Spain. 20th Head and Sovereign of the Order of the Golden Fleece
1960	King Baudouin of the Belgians – 1,171st Knight	1930	1993	
1962	Paul, King of the Hellenes	1901	1964	
1964	Robert II, Duke of Parma	1909	1974	
1964	Carlos, Duke of Calabria	1938	2015	
1964	Constantine II, King of the Hellenes	1940	2023	Monarch of Greece until 1973
1977	Nicolás Cotoner y Cotoner, Marquis of Mondéjar	1905	1996	
1977	Torcuato Fernández-Miranda y Hevia, 1st Duke of Fernández-Miranda	1915	1980	
1977	Beltrán Osorio y Díez de Rivera, Duke of Alburquerque	1919	1994	
1981	Felipe, Prince of Asturias	1968		later King Felipe VI of Spain. 21st Head and Sovereign of the Order of the Golden Fleece
1981	José María Pemán	1897	1981	
1982	Olav V, King of Norway	1903	1991	
1983	King Carl XVI Gustaf of Sweden – 1,183rd Knight	1946		
1983	Jean, Grand Duke of Luxembourg	1921	2019	Grand Duke from 1964 until abdication in 2000
1985	Emperor Akihito of Japan – 1,185th Knight	1933		Honoured as Crown Prince of Japan. Emperor from 1989 until abdication in 2019
1985	King Hussein of Jordan – 1,186th Knight	1935	1999	
1985	Princess Beatrix of the Netherlands – 1,187th Knight	1938		Former Monarch of the Netherlands, Aruba, Curaçao and Sint Maarten, from 1980 until abdication in 2013
1985	Queen Margrethe II of Denmark – 1,188th Knight	1940		Former Monarch of Denmark, Greenland and the Faroe Islands, from 1972 until abdication in 2024
1989	Queen Elizabeth II of the United Kingdom – 1,189th Knight	1926	2022	also Queen of Canada, Australia, New Zealand, Jamaica, The Bahamas, Grenada, Solomon Islands, Tuvalu, Saint Lucia, Saint Vincent and the Grenadines, Belize, Antigua and Barbuda, Papua New Guinea, and Saint Kitts and Nevis, from 1952 until her death in 2022
1994	King Albert II – 1,190th Knight	1934		Monarch of Belgium, until abdication in 2013
1995	King Harald V of Norway – 1,191st Knight	1937	2026	

=== 21st century ===
Year of induction	Name	Born	Died	Notes
2004	Simeon Saxe-Coburg-Gotha – 1,192nd Knight	1937		King of Bulgaria (1943–1946) and Prime Minister of Bulgaria (2001–2005)
2006	King Bhumibol Adulyadej of Thailand – 1,193rd Knight	1927	2016	
2007	Grand Duke Henri of Luxembourg – 1,194th Knight	1955		Grand Duke from 2000 until abdication in 2025
2007	Adolfo Suárez, Duke of Suárez – 1,195th Knight	1932	2014	Prime Minister of Spain (1976–1981)
2007	Abdullah, King of Saudi Arabia – 1,196th Knight	1924	2015	Custodian of the Two Holy Mosques
2010	Javier Solana – 1,197th Knight	1942		Minister of Foreign Affairs (1992–1995), Secretary General of NATO (1995–1999) and High Representative for Common Foreign and Security Policy (1999–2009)
2010	Víctor García de la Concha – 1,198th Knight	1934		Director of the Real Academia Española (1998–2010)
2011	Nicolas Sarkozy – 1,199th Knight	1955		President of the French Republic and Co-Prince of Andorra (2007–2012)
2014	Enrique Valentín Iglesias – 1,200th Knight	1930		President of the Inter-American Development Bank (1988–2005)
2015	Leonor, Princess of Asturias – 1,201st Knight	2005		
2024	Queen Sofía of Spain – 1,202nd Knight	1938		Queen consort of Spain (1975–2014)
2025	Felipe González – 1,203rd Knight	1942		Prime Minister of Spain (1982–1996)
2025	Miguel Herrero y Rodríguez de Miñón – 1,204th Knight	1940		Father of the Constitution
2025	Miquel Roca – 1,205th Knight	1940		Father of the Constitution
2026	Marcelo Rebelo de Sousa – 1,206th Knight	1948		President of Portugal (2016–2026)

== Austrian Golden Fleece ==
=== 18th century ===
Year of induction	Name	Born	Died	Notes
1712	Rinaldo III, Duke of Modena and Reggio	1655	1737	Son of Francesco I d'Este and nephew of Maffeo Barberini; both Knights of the Golden Fleece.
1712	Vincent Gonzague, Duke of Gustalla	1634	1714	
1712	Thomas Emmanuel, Prince of Savoy-Carignan	1687	1729	
1712	Wenceslaus Norbert, Count of Kinsky	1642	1719	
1712	Charles Maximilian, Count of Thurn and Valsassina	1643	1716	
1712	Philip Louis, Count of Sinzendorf	1671	1742	
1712	Gundacre, Count of Starhemberg	1663	1745	
1712	Charles Joseph, Count of Paar	1654	1725	
1712	Fernando de Silva, 13th Count of Cifuentes	1663	1749	
1712	Adam Franz Karl, Prince of Schwarzenberg	1680	1732	
1712	Nicholas, Count of Palffy and Palatine of Hungary	1657	1732	
1712	Norbert Leopold, Count of Kolowrat	1655	1716	
1712	Vicente Pedro Álvarez de Toledo y Portugal, 10th Count of Oropesa	1687	1728	
1712	Wirrich Philip, Count of Daun, Prince of Teano	1668	1741	
1712	Giuseppe Sanseverino, 9th Prince of Bisignano	?	1727	
1712	Francis de Blanes, Count of Centelles	?	?	
1712	John Baptist, Count of Colloredo	1656	1729	
1712	Livio, Prince Odescalchi	1652	1713	
1712	Paolo di Sangro, Prince of San Severo	1657	1726	
1715	Charles Albert of Bavaria	1697	1745	later Elector of Bavaria and Emperor Charles VII
1716	Leopold John, Archduke of Austria	1716	1716	Infant son of Charles VI, Holy Roman Emperor
1721	Augustus III, King of Poland and Saxony	1696	1763	
1721	Infante Manuel of Portugal, Count of Ourém	1714	1777	
1721	Maximilian William, Duke of Hanover-Brunswick and Lunebourg	1666	1726	son of Prince Elector Ernest Augustus, Elector of Brunswick-Lüneburg
1721	Leopold Clement Charles, Hereditary Prince of Lorraine	1707	1723	son of Duke Leopold of Lorraine
1721	Joseph Charles of Bavaria, Count Palatine and Hereditary Prince of Sulzbach	1694	1729	
1721	Ferdinand Marie, Duke of Bavaria	1699	1738	son of Elector Maximilian II Emanuel of Bavaria
1721	Leopold, Prince of Schleswig-Holstein	1674	1744	
1721	Alexander, Prince of Württemberg	1684	1737	
1721	Joseph Folch, Prince of Cardona	1651	1729	
1721	Maximilan Guidobalde, Count of Martinitz	?	1733	
1721	Leopold, Count of Herberstein	1655	1728	
1721	Philip Francis, Prince de Rubempré	1669	1742	
1721	Fabrizio Colonna, 8th Prince of Paliano	1700	1785	
1721	Leopold, Count of Schlick	1663	1723	
1721	Sigismund Frederick, Count of Khevenhuller	1666	1742	
1721	Claude Lamoral, Prince de Ligne	1685	1766	
1721	Froben Ferdinand, Prince of Fürstenberg	1664	1741	
1721	Manuel María de Silva Mendoza y Toledo, X conde Galve	1677	1728	son of Gregorio María de Silva y Mendoza, 9th Duke of the Infantado
1721	Jules, Count of Visconti-Borromeo	1664	1741	
1721	Joseph, Prince of Liechtenstein	1690	1732	
1721	John Joseph, Count of Wrtby	?	1734	
1721	Marino Francesco Caracciolo, 6th Prince of Avellino	1688	1727	
1721	John Anthony de Buxador, Count of Savalla	1673	1745	
1721	Alfonso, Prince of Cardenas and Count of Acerra	1680	1742	
1721	George Thomas, Count of Starhemberg	?	?	
1723	Francis I, Hereditary Prince of Lorraine	1708	1765	later Emperor Francis I. Head of the order from 1740
1729	Prince Charles Alexander of Lorraine	1712	1780	Governor of the Austrian Netherlands and Grand Master of the Teutonic Order
1731	Theodore of Bavaria, Count Palatine of Sulzbach	1659	1733	
1731	Ludwig Georg Simpert, Margrave of Baden-Baden	1702	1761	
1731	Francesco III d'Este, 12th Duke of Modena	1698	1780	
1731	Prince Eugene Francis of Savoy, Duke of Troppau and Piedmont	1714	1734	
1731	Philip, Prince of Lobkowicz	1680	1737	
1731	Walther Xavier, Prince of Dietrichstein	1664	1738	
1731	Joseph Ignatius, Count of Paar	1660	1735	
1731	Johann Kaspar, Count of Cobenzl	1664	1742	
1731	Louis Sanseverino, 10th Prince of Bisignano	1705	1772	
1731	Francis Ferdinand, Count of Kinsky	1678	1741	
1731	Anselm Franz, 2nd Prince of Thurn and Taxis	1670	1739	
1731	Adolf Bernard, Count of Martinitz	1680	1735	
1731	Joseph de Noronha, Count of Monsanto	?	?	
1731	Diego Pignatelli Aragona, 9th Duke of Monteleone	1687	1750	
1731	Johann Antoine, Count of Schaffgotsch	1675	1742	
1731	Lothar Joseph, Count of Königsegg	1673	1751	
1731	Giulio Antonio d'Acquaviva d'Aragona, Count of Conversano	1691	1746	
1731	François Honoré Bonanno del Bosco, Prince di Cattolica	?	1739	
1731	Scipione Publicola, Prince of Santa Croce	1681	1747	
1731	Ferdinand, Count of Plettenberg	1690	1737	
1731	Francis Erwin, Count of Schönborn	1677	1754	
1731	Antonio Tolomeo de Gallio Trivulzio, Prince of Musocco	1692	1767	
1731	Antonio Diego de Portugal Toledo, Count of Alcaudete	1688	1734	
1731	Adriano Antonio Carafa, Duke of Traétto	1696	1765	
1732	Joseph Adam, Prince of Schwarzenberg	1722	1782	
1734	Theodor, Prince of Lubomirski	1683	1745	
1735	Joseph Anton, 6th Prince of Belmonte, 1st Prince of the Holy Roman Empire	1685	1771	
1739	Karl Eugen, Duke of Württemberg	1728	1793	
1739	Ernest, Duke of Saxe-Hildburghausen	1707	1745	
1739	Henri, Prince of Auersperg	1697	1783	
1739	Josef Wenzel, Prince of Liechtenstein	1696	1772	
1739	Johann, Count of Pálffy	1664	1751	
1739	Johann Georg Christian, Prince of Lobkowicz	1686	1755	
1739	Johann Franz, Count of Dietrichstein	1671	1755	
1739	Joseph Wilhelm Ernst, Prince of Fürstenberg	1699	1762	
1739	Marc, Prince of Craon	1679	1754	
1739	Johann Ernest, Count of Schaffgotsch	1685	1747	
1739	Leopold Victorinus, Count of Windisch-Graetz	1686	1746	
1739	Johann Wilhelm, Count of Wurmbrand	1670	1750	
1739	Juan Basilio, Count of Castellvi de Cervellon	1673	1754	
1739	Gundakar, Count of Althan	1665	1747	
1739	John Descaller y Diesbach, Marquis of Pesora	1685	1766	
1739	Nicholas, Prince of Salm-Salm and Duke of Hoogstraten	1701	1770	
1739	Ferdinand, Prince of Pignatelli Strongoli	1689	1767	
1739	Luzio, Count of Sangro and San Severo	1677	1767	
1739	Ambrogio Caracciolo d'Avelino, Prince of Torchiarolo	1699	1748	
1739	Cristiano, Count of Stampa and Montecastello	1712	1744	
1739	Michael John, Count of Althan	1710	1778	
1741	Archduke Joseph of Austria	1741	1790	later Emperor Joseph II. Head of the order from 1765
1744	Paulus Antonius, Prince of Esterházy	1711	1762	
1744	Franz Antonius, Prince of Lamberg	1678	1759	
1744	Antonius Corfitz, Count of Ulfeld	1699	1760	
1744	Louis Andreas, Count of Khevenhuller	1683	1744	
1744	Maximilian Udalric, Count of Kaunitz	1679	1746	
1744	Frederick, Count of Harrach	1696	1749	
1744	Ferdinand Leopold, Count of Heberstein	1695	1744	
1744	Otto Ferdinand, Count of Abensberg und Traun	1677	1748	
1744	Louis, Count Batthyany	1696	1763	
1744	Philipp Joseph, Count of Kinsky	1700	1749	
1744	Rudolf Joseph, Count of Colloredo	1706	1788	
1744	Johann Joseph, Count of Khevenhuller	1706	1776	
1744	Immanuel, Duke of Silva Tarouca	1699	1771	
1744	Charles, Count of Königsegg-Erps	1696	1759	
1744	Wilhelm, Count of Sinzendorf	1697	1766	
1744	Eugène-Hyacinthe de Lannoy, 5th Count of la Motterie	1686	1755	
1749	Charles, Prince of Dietrichstein	1702	1784	
1749	Emanuel, Prince of Liechtenstein	1700	1771	
1749	Alexander Ferdinand, 3rd Prince of Thurn and Taxis	1704	1773	
1749	Johann Wilhelm, Prince of Trautson and Count of Falkenstein	1700	1775	
1749	Charles, Count Batthyany	1697	1772	
1749	Wenzel Anton, Count (later Prince) of Kaunitz-Reitberg	1711	1794	
1749	Maximilian Immanuel, Prince de Hornes	1695	1763	
1749	Ferdinand, Count of Harrach	1708	1778	
1749	Georg, Count of Erdöd	1674	1753	
1751	Ercole III d'Este, 13th Duke of Modena	1727	1803	
1753	Wilhelm Reinhard, Count of Neipperg	1684	1774	
1753	François Joseph de Choiseul, Marquis of Stainville	1694	1770	
1753	Gaspar Fernández, Count of Cordon and Alagon	1674	1753	
1753	Ferdinand-Gaston Joseph, Duke of Croy	1709	1767	
1753	Francis Louis, Count of Salburg	1689	1758	
1753	Leopold, Count of Daun	1705	1766	
1753	Giovanluca, Count of Pallavicini	1697	1773	
1753	Filipo Doria Sforza Visconti	1710	1786	
1753	Francesco, Count of Montecuccoli-Caprara	?	?	
1755	Archduke Charles Joseph of Austria	1745	1761	son of Empress Maria Theresa
1755	Archduke Peter Leopold of Austria	1747	1792	later Emperor Leopold II. Head of the order from 1790
1757	Charles, 5th Duke of Arenberg	1721	1778	
1757	Maximilian Ulysses, Reichsgraf von Browne, Baron de Camus and Mountany	1705	1757	
1759	Johann Karl Philipp, Graf von Cobenzl	1712	1770	
1759	Georg Adam, Count (later Prince) of Starhemberg	1724	1807	
1759	Constantine, Landgrave of Hesse-Rotenburg	1716	1778	
1759	Frederick of Bavaria, Prince Palatine of Zweibrücken	1724	1767	
1759	Agostino, Prince of Chigi and Farnese	1710	1769	
1759	Frederick Ferdinand, Count of Leyen and Hohengeroldeck	1709	1760	
1759	Charles Immanuel, Prince of Gavre	1696	1773	
1759	Friedrich Wilhelm, Count of Haugwitz	1700	1765	
1759	Nicholas, Count of Palffy	1710	1773	
1759	Philippe Krakowsky, Count of Kolowrat	1688	1773	
1759	Charles, Count of Bruener	?	1796	
1759	Rudolf Chotek of Chotkow and Wognin	1708	1771	
1759	Antonio, Marquis of Clerici and Cavenago	1715	1768	
1759	Alessandro, Prince of Ruspoli and 2nd Prince of Cerveteri	1709	1779	
1762	August Georg, Margrave of Baden-Baden	1706	1771	
1763	Archduke Ferdinand Charles of Austria	1754	1806	
1763	Archduke Maximilian Franz of Austria	1756	1801	
1763	Livio, Prince Odescalchi and Duke of Bracciano	1725	1805	
1763	Charles, Count of Firmian	1715	1782	
1763	Anthony, Count of Belgiojsos	1693	1779	later Prince of Belgiojsos
1763	Francis, Count of Orsini and Rosenberg	1723	1796	
1763	Charles, Count of Ogara	?	?	
1763	Nicholas, Count of Esterházy	1711	1764	
1763	Philipp Joseph, Count of Künigl	1696	1770	
1763	Ferdinand Charles, Count of Aspremont-Lynden	1689	1772	
1763	Adam Philipp Losy von Losinthal	1705	1787	
1763	Rudolf, Count of Korzensky of Tereschau	?	?	
1763	Francis Leopold, Count of Buquoy	1703	1768	
1763	Franz Philipp, Count of Sternberg	1708	1786	
1765	Jean Charles Joseph, Count of Merode, Marquis of Deynze	1719	1774	
1765	Jean Baptiste, Count of Serbelloni and Castiglione	1697	1778	
1765	Nicholas, Prince Esterházy	1714	1790	
1765	Antonius, Count of Salm-Reifferscheidt	1728	1769	
1765	Franz Wencel, Count of Wallis	1696	1774	
1765	Anthony, Marquis of Litta and Gambolo	1700	1776	
1765	Camille, Count of Colloredo	1712	1797	
1765	Gabriel, Count of Bethlen	1729	1768	
1765	Francis Norbert, Count of Trauttmansdorf	1705	1786	
1767	Charles Frederick, Count of Hatzfeld-Gleichen	1718	1793	
1767	Johann Karl Walter, Count of Dietrichstein	1728	1808	later Prince of Dietrichstein
1767	Charles Egon, Prince of Fürstenberg	1729	1787	
1768	Archduke Francis Joseph of Austria	1768	1835	later Emperor Francis II (Francis I of Austria). Head of the order from 1792
1770	Claude, Count of Mercy-Argenteau	1727	1794	
1770	Francis Maurice, Count of Lacy	1725	1801	
1771	Archduke Joseph Ferdinand of Austria	1769	1824	later Grand Duke Ferdinand III of Tuscany
1771	Franz, Count of Esterházy	?	1785	
1771	Franz Josef I, Prince of Liechtenstein	1726	1781	
1771	Franz Ulric, Count of Kinsky	1726	1792	
1771	Charles, 2nd Duke d'Ursel	1718	1775	
1772	Prince Karl Josef of Liechtenstein	1730	1789	
1772	Karl Josef, Prince of Ligne	1735	1814	
1772	Franz Gundakar, Count of Colloredo	1731	1807	
1772	Ernst Christoph, Count of Kaunitz-Rietberg	1737	1797	
1772	Maximilian, Prince of Salm-Salm and Duke of Hoogstraten	1732	1773	
1772	Louis Frederick, Count of Zinzendorf et Pottendorf	1721	1783	
1772	Josef, Prince of Lobkowicz and Duke of Sagan	1725	1802	
1775	Bartolomeo, Prince of Corsini and Sismano	1729	1792	
1775	Karl Anselm, 4th Prince of Thurn and Taxis	1733	1805	
1778	Charles Theodore, Elector of Bavaria	1724	1799	
1782	Karl, Landgrave of Hesse-Rheinfels	1746	1812	
1782	Johann, Prince of Schwarzenberg	1742	1789	
1782	Louis Engelbert, 6th Duke of Arenberg	1750	1820	
1782	Leopold Krakowsky, Count of Kolowrat	1727	1809	
1782	Franz Wencel, Count of Sinzendorf and Thannhausen	1724	1792	
1782	Eugen, Count of Wrbna-Freudenthal	1728	1789	
1782	Karl, Count of Palffy ab Erdöd	1735	1816	
1785	Johann Franz, Count of Khevenhüller-Metsch	1737	1797	
1785	Antonius Gotthard, Count of Schaffgotsch	1721	1811	
1785	Antonius, Count of Thurn and Valsassina	1723	1806	
1785	Charles des Princes de Albani Savelli	1749	1811	
1785	Francis Joseph, Prince of Gavre	1731	1797	
1785	Johann, Count of Hardegg of Galtz and Machland	1741	1808	
1789	Ferdinand, Count of Trauttmansdorff-Weinsberg	1749	1827	
1790	Francesco Maria Ruspoli, 3rd Prince of Cerveteri	1752	1829	
1790	Anthony Clement of Saxony	1755	1836	later King of Saxony
1790	Archduke Charles of Austria, Duke of Teschen	1771	1847	
1790	Archduke Alexander Leopold of Austria	1772	1792	son of Emperor Leopold II
1790	Archduke Joseph of Austria, Palatine of Hungary	1776	1848	
1790	Archduke Francis of Austria	1779	1846	later Duke Francis IV of Modena
1790	Karl Josef, Prince of Auersperg	1720	1800	
1790	Alois I, Prince of Liechtenstein	1759	1805	
1790	Antonius, Prince of Esterházy	1738	1794	
1790	Alberic XII, Prince of Belgiojoso and Barbiano	1725	1813	
1790	John, Baron of Hagen	1707	1791	
1790	Eugen Erwin, Count of Shönborn	1727	1801	
1790	Chrisen, Count of Sternberg	1732	1798	
1790	Antoine, Count of Karolyi	1732	1791	
1790	Pompeo, Marquis of Litta Visconti Arese	1727	1797	
1790	Frederick, Count of Nostitz	1728	1796	
1790	Franz, Count of Colloredo	1736	1806	
1792	Archduke Anthony of Austria	1779	1835	son of Emperor Leopold II. Grand Master of Teutonic Knights
1792	Archduke John of Austria	1782	1859	
1792	Philip, 14th Prince of Chimay	1736	1804	
1792	August Josef, Prince of Lobkowicz	1724	1803	
1792	Johann Josef, Count of Wilczek	1738	1819	
1792	Dominikus, Count of Kaunitz-Rietberg-Questenberg	1739	1812	
1792	Joseph, Count of Pallavicini-Centurion	1756	1818	
1792	Charles Clement, Count of Pellegrini	1720	1796	
1792	Franz Georg Karl, Count (later Prince) of Metternich	1746	1818	
1792	Johann Philipp, Count of Cobenzl	1741	1810	
1793	Archduke Ferdinand of Austria	1793	1857	later Emperor Ferdinand I of Austria (until 1848). Head of the Order from 1835 to 1848
1793	Ludwig Eugen, Duke of Württemberg	1731	1795	
1796	Francis Sebastian, Count of Clerfayt	1753	1798	
1796	Karl, Prince of Auersperg	1750	1822	
1798	Marzio Mastrilli, Duke of Gallo	1753	1833	
1798	Ludwig, Count of Cobenzl	1753	1809	
1798	Karl Alexander, 5th Prince of Thurn and Taxis	1770	1827	

=== 19th century ===
Year of induction	Name	Born	Died	Notes
1802	Ludwig, Count of Starhemberg	1761	1833	later Prince of Starhemberg
1803	Joseph, Prince Rospigliosi and Duke of Zagarolo	1755	1833	
1803	Joachim Egon, Landgrave of Fürstenberg	1749	1828	
1803	Franz, Count Esterházy of Galantha	1746	1811	son of Nicholas, Count of Esterházy (1711–1764)
1805	Archduke Rainer Joseph of Austria	1783	1853	
1805	Archduke Louis Joseph of Austria	1784	1864	
1806	Johann I Josef, Prince of Liechtenstein	1760	1836	
1808	Archduke Ferdinand Karl Joseph of Austria-Este	1781	1850	
1808	Karl, Count Zichy of Vasonykeo	1753	1826	
1808	Nikolaus II, Prince Esterházy	1765	1833	
1808	Johann Philipp, Count of Stadion-Thannhausen	1763	1824	
1808	Rudolf, Count of Wrbna and Freudenthal	1761	1823	
1808	Charles Eugene, Prince of Lambesc	1751	1825	
1808	Adams Kasimir, Prince of Czartoryski	1734	1823	
1808	Josef Johann, Prince of Schwarzenberg	1769	1835	
1808	Johann Rudolf, Count Chotek of Chotkow and Wognin	1748	1824	
1808	Prosper, Prince of Sinzendorf	1751	1822	
1808	Immanuel, Count of Khevenhuller	1751	1847	
1808	Josef, Count Erdödy	1754	1824	
1808	Franz, Count Széchényi	1754	1820	
1808	Phillipp Karl, Count of Oettingen-Wallerstein	1769	1826	
1808	Francis, Prince of Orsini and Rosenberg	1761	1832	
1808	Michael Francis, Count of Althan	1760	1817	Obersthofmeister of Empress Maria Ludovica
1808	Stefan, Count of Illeshazy	1762	1838	
1809	Karl, Prince of Schwarzenberg	1771	1820	
1809	Franz Joseph, Prince of Lobkowicz	1772	1816	
1810	Archduke Leopold Johann of Austria	1797	1870	later Grand Duke of Tuscany
1810	Klemens Wenzel, Count (later Prince) of Metternich	1773	1859	
1811	Archduke Rudolph of Austria	1788	1831	later Cardinal and Archbishop of Olomouc
1813	Maximilian I, King of Bavaria	1756	1825	
1814	George Prince of Wales	1762	1830	Prince Regent of the United Kingdom. Later King George IV of the United Kingdom and Hanover
1817	Louis, Count of Ugarte	1749	1817	
1817	Archduke Franz Karl of Austria	1802	1878	
1817	Henri, Count of Bellegarde	1760	1845	
1817	Josef, Count of Wallis	1767	1818	
1817	Josef, Count of Dietrichstein	1763	1825	
1817	Antonius, Count of Brzezie-Lanckoronski	1748	1830	
1817	Franz, Prince of Kohary	1766	1826	
1819	Frederick Augustus, Prince of Saxony	1797	1854	later King Frederick II Augustus of Saxony
1822	Charles Felix, King of Sardinia and Duke of Savoy	1765	1831	
1823	Franz, Count of Saurau	1760	1832	
1823	Henri, Count of Wurmbrand-Stuppach	1762	1847	Obersthofmeister of Empress Carolina Augusta
1823	Vincent Liebsteinsky, Count of Kolowrat	1750	1824	
1823	Charles Alain, Prince of Rohan and Duke of Bouillon (de la Marck | de La Marck | van de Marck)	1764	1836	
1823	Johann Nepomuk, Count of Harrach	1756	1829	
1823	Johann Rudolf, Count Czernin of Chudenitz	1757	1845	
1825	Gilberto, Count of Borromeo Arese	1751	1837	
1825	Ludwig I, King of Bavaria	1786	1868	
1826	Frederick Xavier, Prince of Hohenzollern-Hechingen	1757	1844	
1830	Archduke Albert of Austria, Duke of Teschen	1817	1895	
1830	Archduke Stefan of Austria	1817	1867	
1830	Frederick Ferdinand, Duke of Anhalt-Köthen	1769	1830	
1830	Karl, Prince of Löwenstein-Wertheim-Rosenberg	1783	1849	
1830	Franz Liebsteinsky, Count of Kolowrat	1778	1861	
1830	Rudolf, Prince of Colloredo-Mannsfeld	1772	1843	
1830	Peter, Count of Goëss	1774	1846	
1830	Alfonso Gabriel, Prince of Porcia	1861	1835	
1830	Ignaz, Count of Gyulai	1763	1831	
1830	Paul, Prince Esterházy of Galantha	1786	1866	
1830	Louis, Prince of Liechtenstein	1780	1833	Jungest son of Prince Karl Borromäus of Liechtenstein
1830	Luigi, Count of Contarini	1766	1836	
1830	Alfred, Prince of Windisch-Graetz	1787	1862	
1836	Archduke Charles Ferdinand of Austria	1818	1874	
1836	Archduke Francis of Austria-Este, Prince of Modena	1819	1875	later Duke Francis V of Modena
1836	Antonius, Count of Mittrowsky of Mottrowitz and Nemischl	1770	1842	
1836	Ignaz, Count of Hardegg of Glatz and Machland	1772	1848	
1836	Antonius, Count of Cziraky	1772	1852	
1836	Antonius, Count of Apponyi	1782	1852	
1836	Alois II, Prince of Liechtenstein	1796	1858	
1836	Ferdinand, Prince of Lobkowicz	1797	1868	son of Joseph Franz von Lobkowitz
1836	Adolf, Prince of Schwarzenberg	1799	1888	eldest son of Prince Josef Johann of Schwarzenberg
1836	Karl Egon, Prince of Fürstenberg	1796	1854	
1836	Frederick, Prince of Oettingen-Wallerstein	1793	1842	
1836	Johann Ernst, Count of Hoyos-Sprinzenstein	1779	1849	
1836	Maurice, Count of Dietrichstein-Proskau-Leslie	1775	1864	
1836	Karl, Count Chotek of Chotkow and Wognin	1783	1868	
1838	Charles Joseph Gallarati, Count of Scotti	1775	1840	
1838	Girolamo, Count of Contarini	1770	1843	
1838	Count Fidelius Pálffy of Erdöd	1788	1864	
1838	Archduke Frederick Ferdinand of Austria	1821	1847	
1841	Archduke Leopold Louis of Austria	1823	1898	son of Archduke Rainer of Austria
1841	Maximilian Karl, 6th Prince of Thurn and Taxis	1802	1871	
1841	Victor Emmanuel, Duke of Savoy	1820	1878	later King Victor Emmanuel II of Sardinia and Italy
1844	Archduke Franz Josef of Austria	1830	1916	later Emperor Franz Josef of Austria and King of Hungary. Head of the order from 1848
1844	Silvester, Count of Dandolo	1766	1847	admiral
1844	Archduke Ernst Karl of Austria	1824	1899	son of Archduke Rainer of Austria
1844	Archduke Ferdinand Charles of Austria-Este	1821	1849	son of Duke Francis IV of Modena
1847	Vitalian, Count of Borromeo Arese	1792	1874	
1849	Joseph, Count of Radetzky	1766	1858	
1849	Maximilian II, King of Bavaria	1811	1864	
1849	Luitpold, Prince of Bavaria	1821	1912	later Regent of Bavaria
1850	Albert, Crown Prince of Saxony	1828	1902	later King Albert I of Saxony
1850	Otto, King of the Hellenes	1815	1867	
1852	Archduke Ferdinand Maximilian of Austria	1832	1867	later Emperor Maximilian I of Mexico
1852	Karl Ludwig, Archduke of Austria	1833	1896	
1852	Ferdinand Salvator, Archduke of Austria	1835	1908	later Grand Duke Ferdinand IV of Tuscany
1852	Joseph Charles, Archduke of Austria	1833	1905	son of Archduke Joseph, Palatine of Hungary
1852	Sigismund, Archduke of Austria	1826	1891	son of Archduke Rainer of Austria
1852	Archduke Rainier Ferdinand of Austria	1827	1913	son of Archduke Rainer of Austria
1852	Heinrich, Archduke of Austria	1828	1891	son of Archduke Rainer of Austria
1852	Karl, Prince of Liechtenstein	1790	1865	grandson of Prince Karl Borromäus of Liechtenstein
1852	Hugo, Prince of Salm-Reifferscheid-Krautheim	1803	1888	
1852	Karl II Prince of Schwarzenberg	1802	1858	
1852	Philipp, Prince Batthyany	1781	1870	
1852	Friedrich Egon, Landgrave of Fürstenberg	1774	1856	son of Joachim Egon zu Fürstenberg
1852	Maximilian, Baron of Wimpffen	1770	1854	
1852	Karl Ludwig Graf von Ficquelmont	1777	1857	
1852	Eugen, Count of Wratislaw	1786	1867	
1852	Karl, Count of Brzezie-Lanckoronski	1799	1863	
1852	Ferdinand, Prince of Trauttmansdorff	1803	1856	
1852	Karl Wilhelm, Prince of Auersperg	1814	1890	
1853	Franz, Count of Gyulai	1798	1868	
1853	Leopold, Crown Prince of Belgium and Duke of Brabant	1835	1909	later King Leopold II of the Belgians
1854	Duke Maximilian Joseph in Bavaria	1808	1888	
1854	Duke Ludwig Wilhelm in Bavaria	1831	1920	son of Duke Maximilian Joseph in Bavaria
1857	Giuseppe Archinto, VI Marquis of Parona	1783	1861	
1858	Laval, Count Nugent	1777	1862	
1858	Archduke Rudolf of Austria, Crown Prince of Austria, Hungary and Bohemia	1858	1889	
1859	Prince Karl Theodor of Bavaria	1795	1875	
1860	Karl Anton, Prince of Hohenzollern	1811	1885	
1862	Archduke Ludwig Victor of Austria	1842	1910	
1862	Archduke Karl Salvator of Austria	1839	1892	son of Leopold II of Tuscany
1862	Prince George of Saxony	1832	1904	later King Georg I of Saxony
1862	Duke Karl-Theodor in Bavaria	1839	1909	
1862	Johannes II, Prince of Liechtenstein	1840	1929	
1862	Prince August of Saxe-Coburg and Gotha	1818	1881	
1862	Engelbert, 8th Duke of Arenberg	1824	1875	
1862	Edmund, Prince of Schwarzenberg	1803	1873	
1862	Maximilian Anton Lamoral, Hereditary Prince of Thurn and Taxis	1831	1867	
1862	Nicholas III, Prince Esterhazy	1817	1884	
1862	Charles, Prince of Paar	1806	1881	
1862	Antal Károly, Prince Pálffy of Erdöd	1793	1879	
1862	Franz, Count of Kuefstein	1794	1871	
1862	Franz Ernst, Count of Harrach	1799	1884	
1862	Franz, Count of Hartig	1789	1865	
1862	Johann, Count of Coronini-Cronberg	1794	1880	
1862	Edward, Count of Clam-Gallas	1805	1891	
1864	Ludwig II, King of Bavaria	1845	1886	
1864	Johann Bernard, Count of Rechberg and Rothenlöwen	1806	1890	
1865	Philip, Duke of Württemberg	1838	1917	
1865	Karl Egon, Prince of Fürstenberg	1820	1892	
1865	Edward, Prince of Schönburg-Hartenstein	1787	1872	
1865	Vincent, Prince of Auersperg and Duke of Gotschée	1812	1867	
1865	Camille, Prince of Rohan and Duke of Bouillon	1800	1892	
1865	Franz Séraphin, Count of Nadasdy	1801	1883	
1865	Karl, Count of Grunne	1802	1858	
1865	Rudolf, Count of Apponyi	1812	1875	
1865	Albert, Count of Crivelli and Ossolaro	1816	1868	
1867	Constantine, Prince of Hohenlohe-Schillingsfürst	1828	1896	
1867	Maximilian Egon I, Prince of Fürstenberg	?	1873	
1867	Emerich, Count of Batthyany	1791	1874	
1867	Antonius, Count of Majlath	1801	1873	
1867	Johann, Count of Cziraky	1818	1884	
1867	Archduke Ludwig Salvator of Austria	1847	1915	son of Leopold II of Tuscany
1867	Charles, Prince of Isenburg-Birstein	1838	1899	
1867	Prince Friedrich of Liechtenstein	1807	1885	son of Johann I Josef, Prince of Liechtenstein
1867	Alfred II, Prince of Windisch-Graetz	1819	1876	
1867	Richard, Prince of Metternich-Winneburg	1829	1895	
1867	William Albert, 1st Prince of Montenuovo	1821	1879	
1867	Ernst, Count of Waldstein-Wartenberg	1821	1904	
1867	Count Franz Folliot de Crenneville-Poutet	1815	1888	
1868	Prince Ludwig of Bavaria	1845	1921	later King Ludwig III of Bavaria
1868	Prince Leopold of Bavaria	1846	1930	
1869	Umberto, Crown Prince of Italy	1844	1900	later King Umberto I of Italy
1869	Prince Otto of Bavaria	1848	1916	later King Otto of Bavaria
1869	Franz, Count of Meran	1839	1891	
1869	Johann, Landgrave of Fürstenberg	1802	1879	
1869	Alfred, Count of Potocki	1817	1889	
1869	Tassilo, Count Festétics of Tólna	1813	1883	
1869	Franz, Count of Haller of Halerkeö	1795	1875	
1873	Archduke Friedrich of Austria, Duke of Teschen	1856	1936	
1873	Prince Arnulf of Bavaria	1852	1907	son of Luitpold, Prince Regent of Bavaria
1873	Josef, Prince of Colloredo-Mannsfeld	1813	1895	
1873	Richard, Prince of Khevenhüller	1813	1877	
1873	Erwin, Count of Neipperg	1813	1897	
1873	Johann, Count of Larisch-Mönnich	1821	1884	
1873	Ferdinand, Prince Kinsky	1834	1904	
1875	Duke Maximilian Emmanuel in Bavaria	1849	1893	son of Duke Maximilian Joseph in Bavaria
1877	Julius, Count of Andrassy	1823	1890	
1878	Archduke Franz Ferdinand of Austria	1863	1914	later heir presumptive to the Austro-Hungarian throne
1878	Archduke Leopold Salvator of Austria	1863	1931	son of Archduke Karl Salvator of Austria
1878	Archduke Karl of Austria	1860	1933	
1878	Archduke Eugen of Austria	1863	1954	
1878	Maurice, Count Esterházy	1807	1890	
1878	Antonius, Count of Goëß	1816	1887	
1878	Rudolf, Count of Wrbna and Freudenthal	1818	1883	
1878	Georg von Majlath	1818	1883	later Count of Majlath
1878	Emeric, Prince of Thurn and Taxis	1820	1900	from the Czech branch of the House of Thurn and Taxis
1878	Prince Adolf Wilhelm Daniel von Auersperg	1821	1885	
1878	Richard, Count of Belcredi	1823	1902	
1878	Rodolph, Duke of Croÿ	1823	1902	
1878	Ferdinand, Count of Trauttmansdorff-Weinsberg	1825	1896	
1878	Louis, Count Karolyi of Nagy-Karoly	1825	1889	
1878	Joseph Alexander, Prince of Schönburg-Hartenstein	1826	1896	
1878	Eduard Taaffe, 11th Viscount Taaffe	1833	1895	
1881	Archduke Otto of Austria	1865	1906	
1881	Miguel, Duke of Braganza	1853	1927	
1881	Prince Philipp of Saxe-Coburg and Gotha	1844	1921	
1881	Peter, Count of Pejacsevich	1804	1887	
1881	Karl III, Prince of Schwarzenberg	1824	1904	
1881	Hugo, Count of Abensperg-Traun	1828	1904	
1881	Maurice, Prince of Lobkowicz	1831	1903	
1881	Julius, Count of Szapary	1832	1905	
1881	Charles, 6th Prince of Löwenstein-Wertheim-Rosenberg	1834	1921	
1884	Charles I, King of Romania	1839	1914	
1884	Archduke Ferdinand Charles of Austria	1868	1915	son of Archduke Karl Ludwig of Austria
1884	Archduke Leopold Ferdinand of Austria	1868	1935	removed from the roll of the order, 1902
1884	Archduke Franz Salvator of Austria	1866	1939	son of Archduke Karl Salvator of Austria
1884	Ladislaus de Szögyény-Marich	1841	1916	
1884	Leopold, Count of Thun and Hohenstein	1811	1888	
1884	Jaromir, Count Czernin of Chudenitz	1818	1908	
1884	Karl, Prince of Khevenhüller-Metsch	1839	1905	
1884	Alfred III, Prince of Windisch-Grätz	1851	1927	
1884	Maximilian Maria, Prince of Thurn and Taxis	1862	1885	
1887	Antonius, Count of Szecsen of Temerin	1819	1896	
1887	Arthur, Count of Bylandt-Rheidt	1821	1891	
1887	Paul, Baron Sennyey of Kis-Sennye	1824	1888	
1887	Ludwig, Prince of Windisch-Graetz	1830	1904	
1887	Gustav, Count Kalnoky of Köröspatak	1832	1898	
1887	Nicholas, Count Pejascevich of Veröcze	1833	1890	
1889	Prince Frederick Augustus of Saxony	1865	1932	later King Frederick Augustus III of Saxony
1889	Archduke Albert Salvator of Austria	1871	1896	son of Archduke Karl Salvator of Austria
1889	Baron Lajos Jósika de Branyicska	1807	1891	
1889	Count Moritz Pálffy of Erdöd	1812	1897	
1889	Stephen, Count of Erdödy	1813	1896	
1889	Victor, Prince of Hohenlohe	1818	1893	
1889	Antonius, Count of Wolkenstein-Trotsbourg	1832	1913	
1889	Ernst, Count of Hoyos-Sprinzenstein	1830	1903	
1889	Adolf Josef, Prince of Schwarzenberg	1832	1914	
1889	Julius, Count Karolyi of Nagy-Karoly	1837	1890	
1889	Albert, 8th Prince of Thurn and Taxis	1867	1952	
1891	Archduke Josef Ferdinand of Austria	1872	1942	
1891	Archduke Joseph August of Austria	1872	1962	
1891	Leopold, Count of Sternberg	1811	1899	
1891	Edmond, Prince of Clary and Aldringen	1813	1894	
1891	Richard, Count of Clam-Martinic	1832	1891	
1891	Count Karoly Khuen-Belasi-Héderváry	1849	1918	
1892	Emeric, Count Széchényi of Sárvár-Felsővidék	1825	1898	
1892	Emil Egon, Prince of Fürstenberg	1825	1899	
1892	Leopold, Prince of Croy-Dulmen	1827	1894	
1892	Franz, Count of Falkenhayn	1827	1898	
1892	Ferdinand, Count of Zichy of Zich and Väsonykeö	1829	1911	
1892	Count Philipp of Grunne	1833	1902	
1892	Prince Rudolf of Liechtenstein	1838	1908	
1892	Rudolf, Prince of Lobkowicz	1840	1908	
1892	Karl Friedrich, Prince of Oettingen-Wallerstein	1840	1905	
1893	Albrecht, Duke of Württemberg	1865	1939	
1893	Archduke Peter Ferdinand of Austria	1874	1948	son of Ferdinand IV of Tuscany
1895	Archduke Ladislaus of Austria	1875	1895	son of Archduke Joseph Karl of Austria
1896	Aladar, Count of Andrassy	1827	1903	
1896	Johann, Count of Harrach	1828	1909	
1896	Adam, Prince Sapieha-Kodenski	1828	1903	
1896	Karl, Prince of Paar	1834	1917	
1896	Count Zeno Welser of Welsersheimb	1835	1921	
1896	Paul IV, Prince Esterházy of Galantha	1843	1898	
1896	Franz, Count of Thun-Hohenstein	1847	1916	later Prince of Thun and Hohenstein
1896	Tassilo, Count Festétics of Tólna	1850	1933	later Prince Festétics of Tólna
1896	Clovis, Prince of Hohenlohe-Schillingsfürst	1819	1901	
1896	Agenor, Count of Goluchowski of Goluchowo	1849	1921	
1896	Philippe, Duke of Orléans	1869	1926	
1897	Archduke Heinrich Ferdinand of Austria	1878	1969	son of Ferdinand IV of Tuscany
1898	Eustach, Prince of Sanguszko-Lubartowicz	1842	1903	
1898	Prince Johann Georg of Saxony	1869	1938	son of King George of Saxony
1899	Emanuele Filiberto, 2nd Duke of Aosta	1869	1931	
1900	Prince Rupprecht of Bavaria	1869	1955	later Crown Prince of Bavaria
1900	Prince Georg of Bavaria	1880	1943	
1900	William, Count of Siemienski-Lewicki	1827	1901	
1900	Karl, Prince of Fugger-Babenhausen	1861	1925	
1900	Alexander, Count of Karolyi	1831	1906	
1900	Edward, Count of Paar	1837	1919	
1900	Franz, Count of Deym	1838	1903	
1900	Ladislaus de Szögyény-Marich	1841	1916	
1900	Josef, Count of Thun-Hohenstein-Salm-Reifferscheidt	1849	1913	
1900	Bela, Count of Cziraky	1852	1911	
1900	Alfred, 2nd Prince of Montenuovo	1854	1927	
1900	Karl, Prince of Auersperg	1859	1927	
1900	Nicholas, Prince of Palffy	1861	1955	
1900	Maximilian Egon II, Prince of Fürstenberg	1863	1941	
1900	Robert, Duke of Württemberg	1873	1947	

=== 20th century ===
Year of induction	Name	Born	Died	Notes
1903	Prince Alfred of Liechtenstein	1842	1907	
1903	Count Gyula Széchényi de Sárvár-Felsövidék	1829	1921	
1903	Georg Christian, Prince of Lobkowicz	1835	1908	
1903	Count Karl of Brzezie-Lanckoronski	1848	1933	
1903	Margrave Alexander of Pallavicini	1853	1933	
1903	Alois, Prince of Schönburg-Hartenstein	1858	1944	
1903	Miklós, Prince Esterházy of Galántha	1869	1920	
1905	Archduke Charles of Austria	1887	1922	later Emperor Charles I of Austria, King Charles IV of Hungary and III of Bohemia. Head of the order from 1916 until 1922
1907	Wilhelm, Prince of Hohenzollern	1864	1927	
1907	Prince Albert of Belgium	1874	1934	later King Albert I of the Belgians
1907	Elias, Duke of Parma	1880	1959	Head of the Ducal House of Parma
1907	Prince Konrad of Bavaria	1883	1969	son of Prince Leopold of Bavaria
1907	Count Albin Csaky de Körösszeg et Adorján	1841	1912	
1907	Count Sándor Apponyi de Nagy-Apponyi	1844	1925	
1907	Karl, Prince of Trauttmansdorff-Weinsberg	1845	1921	
1907	Franz Josef, Prince of Auersperg	1856	1938	
1907	Karl, Prince Kinsky of Wchinitz and Tettau	1858	1919	
1907	Hugo, Prince of Dietrichstein of Nikolsbourg	1858	1920	
1907	Karl, Prince of Schwarzenberg	1859	1913	
1907	Count Andreas Potocki	1861	1927	
1907	Ernst Rüdiger, Prince of Starhemberg	1861	1927	
1907	Johann, Prince of Hohenlohe-Bartenstein	1863	1921	
1907	Count Johann of Meran	1867	1947	
1908	Ernst, Prince of Windisch-Graetz	1827	1918	
1908	Count Ladislaus Pejácsevich de Veröcze	1828	1916	
1908	Prince Alajos Esterházy of Galántha	1844	1912	
1908	Count Rudolf of Khevenhuller-Metsch	1844	1910	
1908	Alain, Prince of Rohan	1853	1914	
1908	Count Roman Potocki	1852	1915	
1908	Miklós, Count Szécsen de Temerin	1857	1926	
1908	Ferdinand Zdeněk, Prince of Lobkowicz	1858	1938	
1909	Ferdinand, Crown Prince of Romania	1865	1927	later King Ferdinand I of Romania
1910	Archduke Karl Albrecht of Austria	1888	1951	
1911	Ferdinand I, King of Bulgaria	1861	1948	
1911	Prince Alois of Liechtenstein	1869	1955	
1911	Count Rudolph of Montecuccoli	1843	1922	
1911	Count Leopold of Gudenus	1843	1913	
1911	Count Antonius of Cziraki	1850	1930	
1911	Count Eugen Czernin of Chudenitz	1851	1925	
1912	Karl de Longueval, Count of Buquoy	1854	1911	
1912	Leopold, Count Berchtold von und zu Ungarschitz, Frättling und Püllütz	1863	1942	
1913	Ferdinand Jiří, Prince of Lobkowicz	1850	1926	Eldest son of Joseph Franz Karl von Lobkowicz
1914	Friedrich August Georg, Crown Prince of Saxony	1893	1943	son of King Frederick Augustus III of Saxony
1915	Archduke Maximilian Eugen of Austria	1895	1952	
1915	Archduke Franz Karl Salvator of Austria	1893	1918	son of Archduke Franz Salvator of Austria
1915	Archduke Hubert Salvator of Austria	1894	1971	
1915	Archduke Leon Karl of Austria	1893	1939	
1915	Archduke Wilhelm Franz of Austria	1895	1954	
1915	Archduke Joseph Franz of Austria	1895	1957	
1915	Count Augustus Zichy de Zich et Vásonkeö	1852	1925	
1915	Johann, Prince of Schwarzenberg	1860	1938	
1915	Count Ferdinand Kinsky of Wchinitz and Tettau	1886	1916	
1916	Archduke Albert Franz of Austria	1897	1955	
1916	Archduke Ranier Karl of Austria	1895	1930	
1916	Archduke Leopold of Austria	1897	1958	
1916	Archduke Otto of Austria, Crown Prince of Austria, Hungary and Bohemia	1912	2011	Head of the House of Habsburg and Sovereign of the Order of the Golden Fleece from 1922 to 2007
1916	Count Aurel Dessewffy de Csernek et Tarkeö	1846	1928	
1916	Baron Samuel Josika	1848	1923	
1916	Gyula, Count Andrássy de Csíkszentkirály et Krasznahorka	1860	1929	
1916	Ladislaus, Prince of Batthyany-Strattmann	1870	1931	
1917	Philipp Albrecht, Duke of Württemberg	1893	1975	later Head of the Royal House of Württemberg
1917	Franz I, Prince of Liechtenstein	1853	1938	
1917	Count Johann Nepomuk of Wilczek	1837	1922	
1917	Konrad, Prince of Hohenlohe-Schillingsfürst	1863	1918	
1917	Friedrich Karl, Count of Schönborn-Bucheim	1869	1932	
1917	Gottfried, Prince of Hohenlohe-Schillingsfürst	1867	1932	
1917	Ottokar, Count Czernin von und zu Chudenitz	1872	1932	
1918	Count Miklós Móric Esterházy of Galántha	1855	1925	
1918	Zdenko Vincent, Prince of Lobkowicz	1858	1933	
1918	Count Heinrich of Clam-Martinic	1863	1932	
1918	Count Karl of Kuefstein	1838	1925	
1918	Count Joseph of Hunyady	1873	1942	
1918	Stephan, Count Burián von Rajecz	1851	1922	
1919	Count Georg of Wallis	1856	1928	
1919	Count Nikolaus Revertera of Salandra	1860	1951	
1920	Prince Johann of Schönburg-Hartenstein	1864	1937	
1920	Karl Emil, Prince of Furstenberg	1867	1945	
1921	Prince Johann of Liechtenstein	1873	1959	
1921	Albert, Count Apponyi de Nagy-Appony	1846	1933	
1921	Count Alexander Esterházy of Galántha	1868	1925	
1932	Archduke Robert of Austria-Este	1915	1996	
1932	Archduke Gottfried of Austria	1902	1984	Head of the Grand Ducal House of Tuscany
1932	Maximilian, Duke of Hohenberg	1902	1962	
1932	Baron Erwein of Gudenus	1869	1953	
1932	Count Heinrich of Degenfeld-Schonburg	1890	1978	
1932	Count Joseph Karolyi of Nagy-Karoly	1884	1934	
1932	Count Joseph Cziraki of Czirak and Dénesfalva	1883	1960	
1934	Archduke Georg of Austria	1905	1952	son of Archduke Peter Ferdinand of Austria
1934	Count Johann Zichy	1868	1944	
1945	Archduke Felix of Austria	1916	2011	son of Emperor Charles I of Austria (King Charles VI of Hungary and III of Bohemia)
1945	Archduke Carl Ludwig of Austria	1918	2007	son of Emperor Charles I of Austria (King Charles VI of Hungary and III of Bohemia)
1945	Archduke Rudolf Syringus of Austria	1919	2010	son of Emperor Charles I of Austria (King Charles VI of Hungary and III of Bohemia)
1945	Prince Ernst of Hohenberg	1904	1954	
1945	Count Antonius of Sigray	1879	1947	
1946	Margrave Georg of Pallavicini	1881	1946	
1946	Leopold, Count Künigl	1880	1965	
1948	Duarte Nuno, Duke of Braganza	1907	1976	Head of the Royal House of Portugal
1948	Franz Joseph II, Prince of Liechtenstein	1906	1989	
1948	Archduke Theodor Salvator of Austria	1899	1978	son of Archduke Franz Salvator of Austria
1948	Count Ferdinand of Colloredo-Mannsfeld	1878	1967	
1949	Baron Franz of Vorst-Gudenau-Mirbach	1878	1952	
1950	Friedrich Christian, Margrave of Meissen	1893	1968	Head of the Royal House of Saxony
1950	Friedrich, Prince of Hohenzollern-Sigmaringen	1891	1965	
1950	Count Georg of Waldburg-Zeil-Hohenems	1878	1955	
1950	Count Bernhard of Stolberg-Stolberg	1881	1952	
1950	Margrave Alphons of Pallavicini	1883	1958	
1950	Count Rudolf of Straten-Ponthoz	1877	1961	
1951	Archduke Ferdinand of Austria	1918	2004	son of Archduke Maximilian Eugen of Austria. Nephew of Emperor Charles I of Austria
1951	Prince Heinrich of Liechtenstein	1916	1991	
1951	Joseph, Prince of Schwarzenberg	1900	1979	
1951	Erich, Prince of Waldburg-Zeil and Trauchburg	1899	1953	
1951	José de Saldanha da Gama	1893	1958	
1951	Baron Gábor Apor de Al-Torja	1889	1969	
1953	Albrecht, Hereditary Prince of Bavaria	1905	1996	later Duke of Bavaria and Head of the Royal House of Bavaria
1953	Ladislaus, Prince of Batthyany-Strattmann	1904	1966	
1953	Eduard, Prince of Auersperg	1863	1956	
1953	Count Karl of Trauttmansdorff-Weinsberg	1897	1970	
1953	Count Carl of Czernin of Chudenitz	1886	1978	
1953	Count János Esterházy de Galántha	1900	1967	
1953	Count Philipp of Gudenus	1905	1990	
1954	Eugène, 11th Prince of Ligne	1893	1960	
1954	Count Franz Josef Forni	1904	1992	
1954	Viscount Charles Terlinden	1878	1972	
1955	Archduke Heinrich of Austria	1925	2014	son of Archduke Maximilian Eugen of Austria
1955	Count Thierry de Limburg Stirum	1904	1968	
1955	Count Charles de Limburg Stirum (Note: It was recorded by Arnaud de Limburg Stirum that Charles was a Knight during the burial of Count Thierry de Limburg Stirum in 1968.)	1906	1989	
1955	Gaston Christyn, Count of Ribaucourt	1882	1961	
1957	Count Rudolf Hoyos-Sprinzenstein	1884	1972	
1957	Count Peter Revertera of Salandra	1893	1966	
1957	Count Franz of Meran	1891	1983	
1958	Archduke Friedrich Salvator of Austria	1927	1999	son of Archduke Hubert Salvator of Austria
1958	Archduke Franz Salvator of Austria	1927	2012	son of Archduke Theodor Salvator of Austria
1960	Archduke Joseph Árpád of Austria	1933	2017	
1960	Franz, Hereditary Prince of Bavaria	1933		later Duke of Bavaria and Head of the Royal House of Bavaria
1960	Prince Ludwig of Bavaria	1913	2008	
1960	Karl, 8th Prince of Löwenstein-Wertheim-Rosenberg	1904	1990	
1960	Karl, Prince of Schwarzenberg	1911	1986	
1960	Count Johann-Anton of Goëss	1892	1970	
1960	Count Adalbert Hadik de Futak	1905	1971	
1960	Count Johann Larisch of Moennich	1917	1997	
1961	Archduke Karl of Austria	1961		Head of the House of Habsburg and Sovereign of the Order of the Golden Fleece since 2007
1962	Archduke Anton of Austria	1901	1987	Son of Archduke Leopold Salvator of Austria
1962	Engelbert von Croÿ	1891	1974	Son of Karl Herzog von Croy
1962	Franz Anton von Thun und Hohenstein	1890	1973	Nephew of Franz von Thun und Hohenstein
1962	Amédée Comte d’Andigné	1900	1993	
1962	Prince Albert II of Belgium	1934		Monarch between 1993 and 2013
1972	Jean, Grand Duke of Luxembourg	1921	2019	Monarch until 2000
1972	Angelo de Mojana di Cologna	1905	1988	77th Grand Master of the Knights Hospitaller
1972	Archduke Andreas Salvator of Austria, Prince of Tuscany	1936		son of Archduke Hubert Salvator of Austria
1972	Archduke Karl Salvator of Austria, Prince of Tuscany	1936		son of Archduke Theodore Salvator of Austria (born 1899)
1972	Karl August, 10th Prince of Thurn and Taxis	1898	1982	Head of the House Thurn und Taxis (1971–1982)
1972	Amaury de Merode	1902	1980	President of the FIA (1971–1975)
1972	Antoine, Prince of Ligne	1925	2005	
1972	Raymond, Viscount of Chabot-Tramecourt	1924	2012	
1973	Archduke Clemens Salvator of Austria-Tuscany	1904	1974	Son of Archduke Franz Salvator of Austria
1973	Prince Albrecht of Hohenberg	1931	2021	
1974	Joachim Egon, Prince of Fürstenberg	1923	2002	
1975	Prince Rasso of Bavaria	1926	2011	
1975	Carl, Duke of Württemberg	1936	2022	Head of the Royal House of Württemberg
1975	Alain de Rohan, Prince of Rohan	1893	1976	Son of Alain de Rohan (born 1853)
1976	Eduard, Prince of Auersperg-Trautson	1917	2002	
1977	Archduke Lorenz of Austria-Este, Prince of Belgium	1955		
1977	Prince Vincenz of Liechtenstein	1950	2008	
1977	Ernst von Thun und Hohenstein	1905	1985	Brother of Franz Anton von Thun und Hohenstein
1978	Maria Emanuel, Margrave of Meissen	1926	2012	Head of the Royal House of Saxony
1978	Nikolaus, Prince of Lobkowicz	1931	2019	
1978	Count Johann of Hoyos-Sprinzenstein	1923	2010	
1980	Archduke Michael Salvator of Austria, Prince of Tuscany	1949		son of Archduke Hubert Salvator of Austria
1980	Archduke Michael Koloman of Austria	1942		son of Archduke Joseph Francis of Austria
1980	Georg, Prince of Waldburg-Zeil and Trauchberg	1928	2015	
1980	Charles de Limburg Stirum	1906	1989	
1981–1994	Hans-Adam II, Prince of Liechtenstein	1945		
1981–1994	Prince Clemens of Altenburg	1932	2022	
1981–1994	Duarte Pio, Duke of Braganza	1945		Head of the Royal House of Portugal
1981–1994	Count Joseph of Neipperg	1918	2020	
1981–1994	Georg, Duke of Hohenberg	1929	2019	
1981–1994	Charles Emile Comte d’Oultremont	1915	1993	
1981–1994	Archduke Georg of Austria	1964		
1981–1994	Georg, Graf von Nostitz-Rieneck	1904	1992	
1981–1994	Archduke Carl Christian of Austria	1954		
1981–1994	Karl Johannes, Prince of Schwarzenberg	1937	2023	
1981–1994	Archduke Joseph of Austria	1960		son of Archduke Joseph Árpád of Austria
1981–1994	Fra Andrew Bertie, Grand Master of the Order of Malta	1929	2008	
1981–1994	Count Jakob of Eltz	1921	2006	
1981–1994	Max, Prince of Khevenhüller-Metsch	1919	2010	
1996	Aloys-Konstantin, Prince of Löwenstein-Wertheim-Rosenberg	1941		
1996	Count Gottfried of Czernin of Chudenitz	1927	2002	
1996	Gottfried Graf von Degenfeld-Schönburg	1925	2005	
2000	Heinrich, Prince of Orsini and Rosenberg	1925	2011	
2000	Mariano Hugo, Prince of Windisch-Grätz	1955		
2000	Olivier, Count of Ormesson	1918	2012	
2000	Baron Johann Friedrich of Solemacher-Antweiler	1945		
2000	Baron Nicolas Adamovich de Csepin	1936	2017	

=== 21st century ===
Year of induction	Name	Born	Died	Notes
2001	Friedrich, Duke of Württemberg	1961	2018	Son of Carl, Duke of Württemberg
2001	Georg Adam Starhemberg	1961		Since 1997 Head of the House of Starhemberg
2001	Bernard Guerrier de Dumast	1932	2019	
2002	Alexander Schönburg-Hartenstein	1930	2018	Since 1992 Head of the House of Schönburg-Hartenstein
2002	Kubrat, Prince of Panagyurishte and Duke of Saxony	1965		3rd Son of Tsar Simeon II of Bulgaria
2004	Friedrich Mayr-Melnhof	1924	2020	
2007	Henri, Grand Duke of Luxembourg	1955		Son of Jean
2008	Prince Philippe, Duke of Brabant	1960	-	later King Philippe of the Belgians. Mentioned in his biography in the "Biographical Manual" (2007), an official publication of the Belgian Senate
2011	Michel, 14th Prince of Ligne	1951	-	
2011	Prince Charles-Louis de Merode	1948	-	
2011	Ferdinand Zvonimir von Habsburg	1997	-	son and heir of Archduke Karl of Austria, Head of the House of Habsburg and Sovereign of the Order
2011	Prince Michael of Liechtenstein	1951	-	
2011	Fra' Robert Matthew Festing, 79th Prince and Grand Master of the Order of Malta	1949	2021	Monarch until 2017
2011	Maximilian Turnauer	1930	2020	
2011	Peter Seilern-Aspang	1952	-	
2011	Alexander von Sachsen, Margrave of Meissen	1953	-	
2011	Dominic of Austria-Tuscany	1937	-	son of Archduke Anton of Austria-Tuscany
2011	Ferdinand Trauttmansdorff-Weinsberg	1950	-	Austrian ambassador in Prague
2011	Prospero Colonna, Prince of Avella	1956	-	
2011	Prince Nikolaus of Liechtenstein	1947	-	son of Franz Joseph II, Prince of Liechtenstein
2011	Georg von Károlyi	1946	-	
2011	Victor Freiherr von Baillou	1931	2023	son-in-law of Archduke Anton of Austria-Tuscany since 1973
2016	Eduard of Habsburg-Lorraine	1967	-	great-grandson of Archduke Joseph August of Austria
2016	Emanuel Salm-Salm	1961	-	
2016	Johannes Trapp von Matsch	1946	2024	
2018	Maximilian of Habsburg-Lorraine	1961		Son of Ferdinand of Austria (1918–2004)
2019	Asfa-Wossen Asserate	1948		great-nephew of Emperor Haile Selassie
2019	Nicolas, Duke of Hohenberg	1961		Son of Georg, Duke of Hohenberg
2020	Franz Joseph Prinz von Auersperg-Trautson	1954		Son of Eduard Karl, Fürst von Auersperg-Trautson
2021	Joseph Albert of Habsburg-Lorraine	1994		Son of Joseph Habsburg (°1960)
2021	Severin Meister	1981		Son of Gabriela von Habsburg, Grand Mistress of the Order of the Starry Cross
2022	Alois, Hereditary Prince of Liechtenstein	1968		
2022	Rodolphe, Count of Looz-Corswarem	1944		
2022	Zsolt Semjén	1962		Deputy Prime Minister of Hungary
2023	John T. Dunlap	1957		Grand Master of the Sovereign Military Order of Malta
2024	Simeon Archduke of Austria			
2024	Prince Ferdinand of Schwarzenberg	1989		
2024	Niklas Altgraf zu Salm-Reifferscheidt-Raitz	1972		
2024	Johannes Count of Meran	1961		

== Rival branches ==
=== Josephine branch of the Spanish Golden Fleece (1809–1813) ===
Year of induction	Name	Born	Died	Notes
1809	Jérôme Bonaparte, king of Westphalia	1784	1860	
1810	Miguel José de Azanza, 1st Duke (Josephine) of Santa Fe	1744	1826	Viceroy of New Spain (1798–1800)
1810	Manuel de Negrete, 2nd count of Campo Alange, 1st marquess de Torre-Manzanal, 1st duke (Josephine) de Campo de Alange	1736	1818	
1811	José de Mazarredo Salazar Muñatones y Gortázar	1745	1812	Lieutenant General of the Royal Spanish Navy
1812	Gonzalo O'Farrill y Herrera	1754	1831	
1812	Mariano Luis de Urquijo y Murga	1769	1817	Secretary of State (1798–1800). Minister-Secretary of State (1808–1813)

=== Carlist branch of the Spanish Golden Fleece (1836–1931) ===
Year of induction	Name	Born	Died	Notes
ca. 1836	Joaquín Abarca y Blanque, bishop of León	1778	1844	
ca. 1836	Manuel María de Medina Cabañas y Verdes Montenegro, 1st Count (Carlist) of Casa Medina	1773	1856	
ca. 1838	Miguel Gómez y Damas, 1st Marquess (Carlist) of Orbaiceta	1796	1849	
ca. 1850	Infante Alfonso Carlos, Duke of San Jaime	1849	1936	Grandson of Carlos María Isidro, 1st Carlist Pretender. Futur 6th Carlist Pretender as Alfonso Carlos 1st.
ca. 1870	Ramón Cabrera y Griñó, 1st Count (Carlista) of Morella, 1st Marquess (Carlist) of El Ter and 1st Duke (Carlist) of El Maestrazgo (Note: Reconoció a Alfonso XII como rey en 1875, confirmando el gobierno liberal ese mismo año sus títulos pero no el Toisón.)	1806	1877	
ca. 1875	Hermenegildo Díaz de Cevallos, 1st Count (Carlist) of Vinculo, 1st Marquess (Carlist) of Cevallos	1814	1891	
ca. 1875	Joaquín de Elío y Ezpeleta, 1st Marquess (Carlist) of La Lealtad and 1st I Duke (Carlist) of Elío	1806	1876	
ca. 1875	Pedro Caro y Álvarez de Toledo, 5th Marquess of La Romana and 1st Count (Carlist) of La Real Estimación	1827	1890	
ca. 1895	Enrique de Aguilera y Gamboa, 17th Marquess of Cerralbo, 11th Count of La Alcudia	1845	1922	
ca. 1900 (Note: Los pretendientes carlistas mantuvieron su propia orden hasta 1931 aunque no se realizaron nombramientos posteriones.)	Tirso de Olazábal y Lardizábal, 1st Count of Arbelaiz, 1st Count of Oria	1842	1921	

==== Carloctaviste branch ====
On 29 June 1943 Archduke Karl Pius of Austria, Prince of Tuscany issued a manifesto in which he claimed to be the legitimate successor to the Spanish throne. At the time, he had three older brothers still living, but none of these had shown an interest in claiming the throne for himself. In 1947 Karl's older brothers Leopold and Franz Josef formally renounced their rights in New York. In 1948 his other brother Anton verbally renounced his rights in Barcelona. (Both Anton and Franz Josef would take up the claim after Karl died, and Anton's son Dominic is the current claimant.)

Karl was recognised by his supporters as Carlos VIII; his movement is therefore called carloctavismo or octavismo. He used the title Duke of Madrid as his grandfather had done. Karl received the support of some of the most conservative Carlist leaders. He also received a certain level of support from some of General Franco's officials in the Movimiento Nacional; the followers of the Carlist regent Prince Xavier of Bourbon-Parma claimed that the Francoist support was merely an attempt to divide Carlists. Karl moved to Andorra and then returned to Barcelona. Between 1944 and 1951 he gave out fourteen titles of nobility; he also named members to the Order of Proscribed Legitimacy and the Order of Santa Maria of the Lily of Navarre. He established a new order of merit named in honour of Saint Charles Borromeo. In 1952 he awarded the collar of this order to General Franco and the grand cross of the order to Cardinal Federico Tedeschini, papal legate to the International Eucharistic Congress in Barcelona.

Since Karl claimed to be the legitimate successor to the Spanish throne Carloctavismo also has its own branch of the Spanish Order of the Golden Fleece. For a list of the Knights of the Carloctaviste branch of the Spanish Golden Fleece (1943 to present) see fr:Liste des chevaliers de l'ordre de la Toison d'or#Ordre carloctaviste de la Toison d'Or

== Napoleon's project to merge the Spanish and Austrian branches of the order ==
On 15 August 1809, Emperor Napoleon I of France planned the creation of a new order which would receive the name of Ordre des Trois Toisons d'Or (Order of the Three Golden Fleece). It was planned to merge the Spanish and Austrian branches and to extend the order to France, and to reflect this merger in a design made up of three copies of the golden fleece of the pre-existing orders, in which design would also be shown the French Imperial (Napoleonic) Eagle. It was projected that the order would count a maximum of 100 Grand Knights, and would include two new categories of 400 Commanders and 1000 Knights. However Napoleon's project never materialized.

== Bibliography ==
- Knights of the Golden Fleece
