= Merode =

Merode may refer to:

== People ==
- House of Merode, a princely dynasty belonging to the Belgian nobility
  - Jean Philippe Eugène de Mérode (1674–1732), Imperial Field Marshal
  - Félix de Mérode (1791–1857), Belgian politician
  - Xavier de Mérode (1820–1874), Belgian prelate and statesman
  - Antoinette de Mérode (1828–1864), Princess of Monaco, married Charles III, Prince of Monaco
  - Cléo de Mérode (1875–1966), French dancer of the Belle Époque
  - Prince Alexandre de Mérode (1934–2002), head of drug testing policy for the IOC
  - Emmanuel de Merode (born 1970), Director of Virunga National Park, Democratic Republic of the Congo
- Master of Merode or Robert Campin (c. 1375–1444), a master of Flemish and Early Netherlandish painting

== Other uses ==
- Mérode Altarpiece, a triptych in The Cloisters, New York City, New York, U.S.
- Mérode Cup, a medieval silver-gilt cup that once belonged to the Merode family
- Merode station, a railway and metro station in Brussels
- MERODE, an Object Oriented Enterprise Modeling method
