= Château de Serrant =

Renaissance château in the Loire Valley, France

Coordinates: 47°24′54″N 0°44′38″W

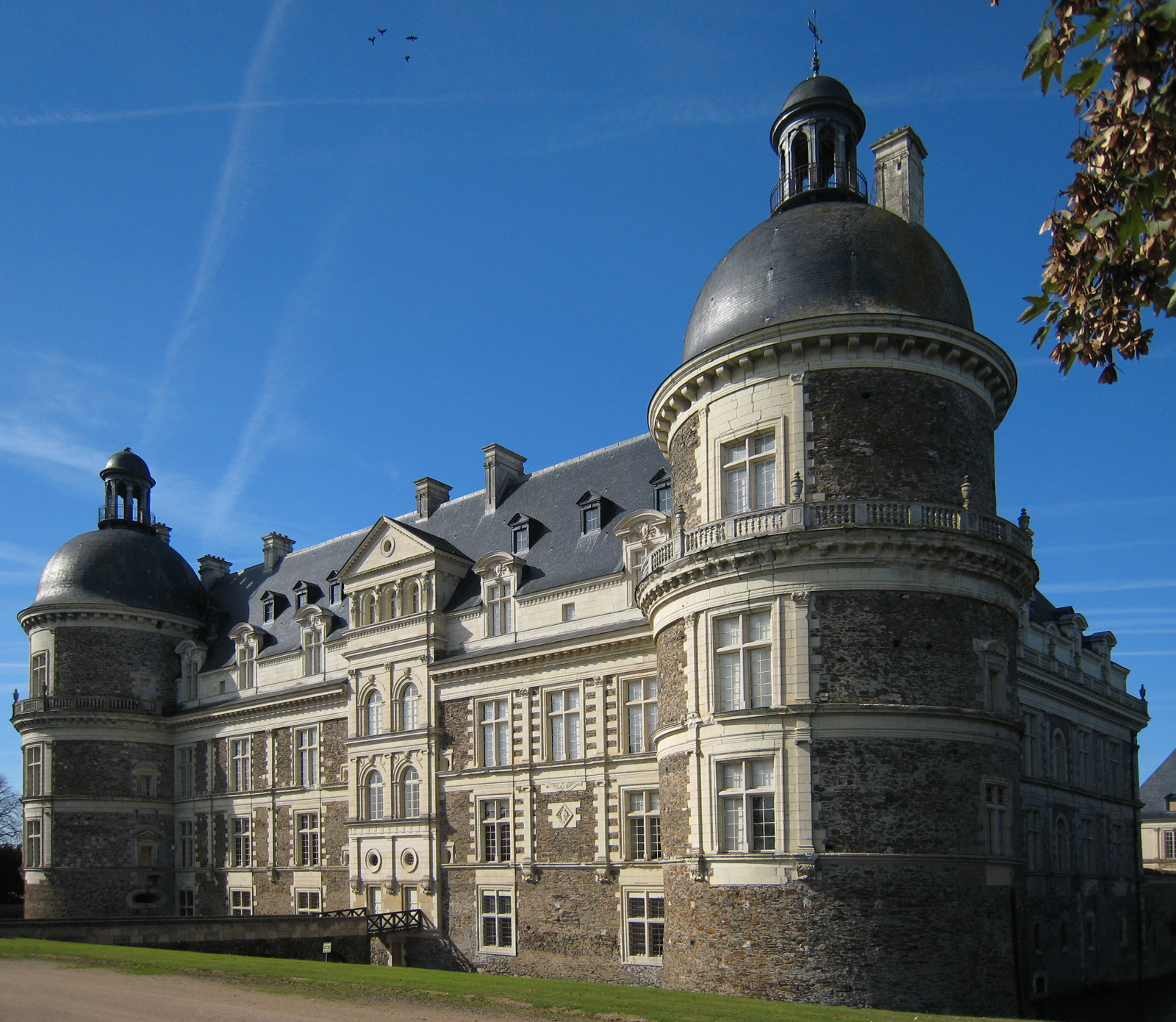
Château de Serrant - front

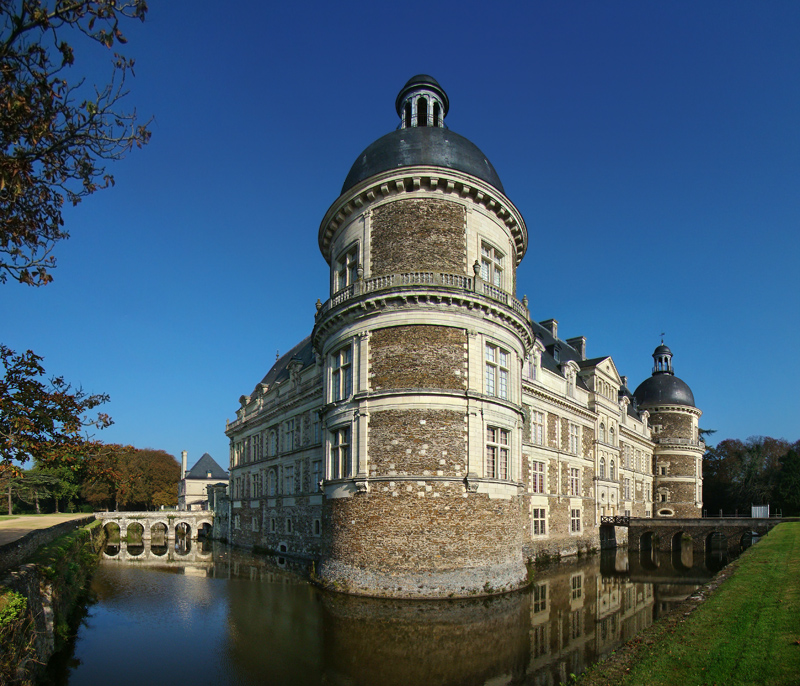
Side view of the main facade

The Château de Serrant (French pronunciation: [ʃato də seʁɑ̃]) is a Renaissance château situated in the Loire Valley, 15 kilometres (9.3 mi) to the west of Angers. The château is the private residence of the Prince of Merode, but it is open to visitors.

== Early history ==
The Renaissance château is built on the foundations of a medieval fortress. From the 14th century, it was held by the Brie family. Charles de Brie was inspired to start modernisation early in the 16th century, but lack of funds meant the project was halted with only the North Tower completed.

Ownership then changed hands several times before Guillaume Bautru, a State Councillor, purchased the property in 1636. Bautru restarted the construction that had been halted over a century earlier. By using Charles de Brie's original plans and the same russet schist and white tuffeau stone, Bautru ensured that there was a continuity of design. The central halls, two wings and the South Tower were added, with Jules Hardouin-Mansart completing the work of Bautru by building the chapel.

In 1749, the estate was sold by the last surviving descendant of the Bautru family to Antoine Walsh, a wealthy slave trader from Nantes, who came from a family of exiled Irish Jacobites. As well as redecorating the interior of the castle, the Walsh family built an English-style park, pavilions and a monumental gate complete with the family crest.

== Subsequent history ==
The château eventually passed out of the hands of the Walsh family in 1830, when Valentine Eugénie Joséphine Walsh de Serrant married the Duc de La Trémoïlle (1764–1839). The duke assigned Luciene Magne the task of restoring the château and several features were added, including parapets and cornices. Descendants of the La Trémoïlle family still own the château, but in the 20th century, it was modernised with cellars and the introduction of electricity.

The current owners are descendants of Prince Jean Charles de Ligne-La Trémoïlle (1911–2005). His elder daughter, Princesse Hedwige de Ligne-La Trémoïlle, is married to Prince Charles-Guillaume de Merode, 14th Marquess of Westerlo and 3rd Prince of Merode. Their children include Prince Emmanuel de Merode.

The castle is notable for its library (stocked with 12,000 books), the vaulted halls that originally held the kitchens, and Napoleon's bedroom, which was never used by the emperor as he stayed at the castle for only two hours.

== Gallery ==
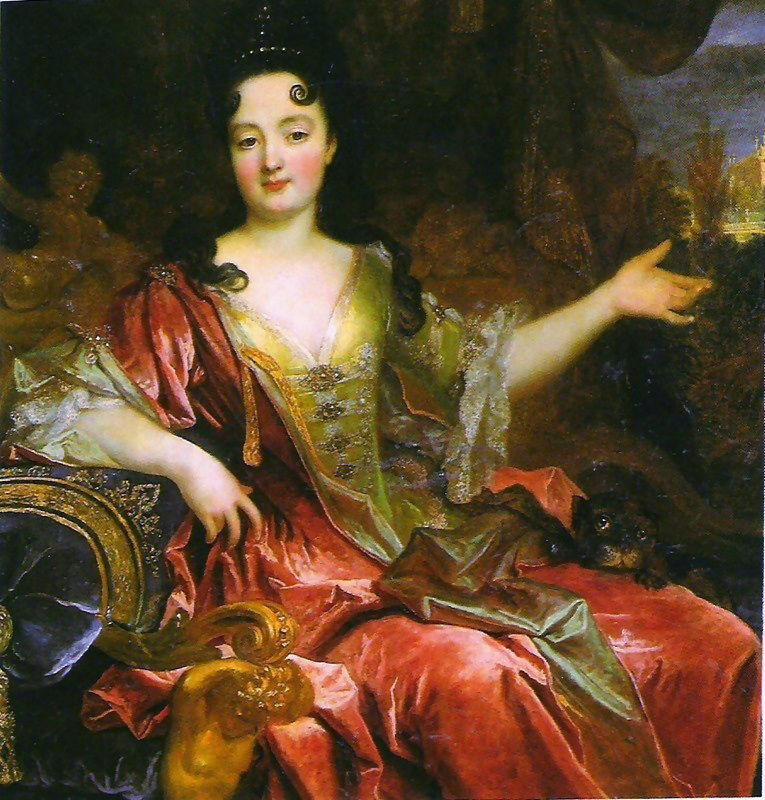
Marie Anne de La Trémoille, Duchess of Bracciano. Collection of the Prince de Merode

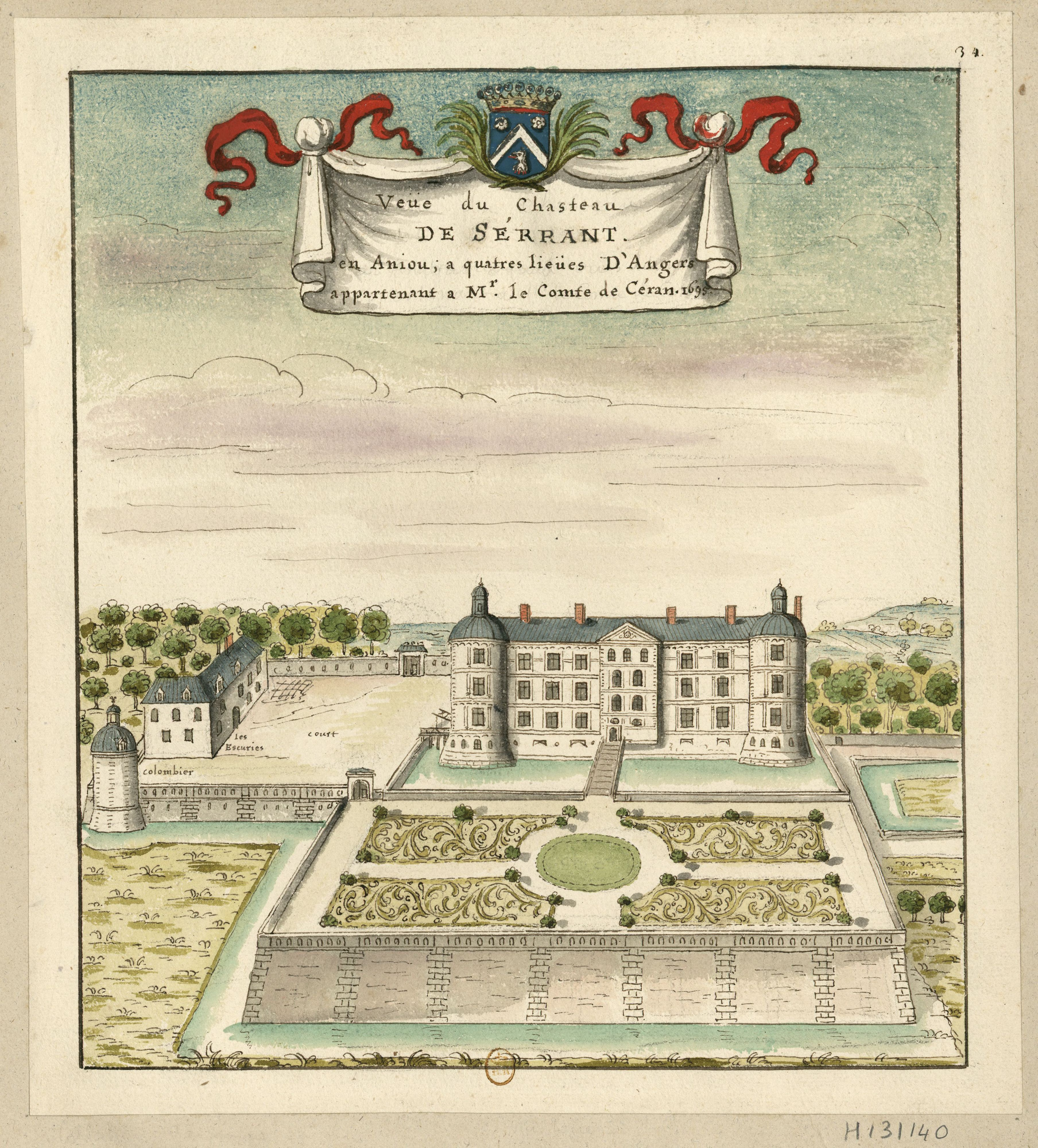
View of the château de Serrant from the garden side in 1695, drawing by Louis Boudan

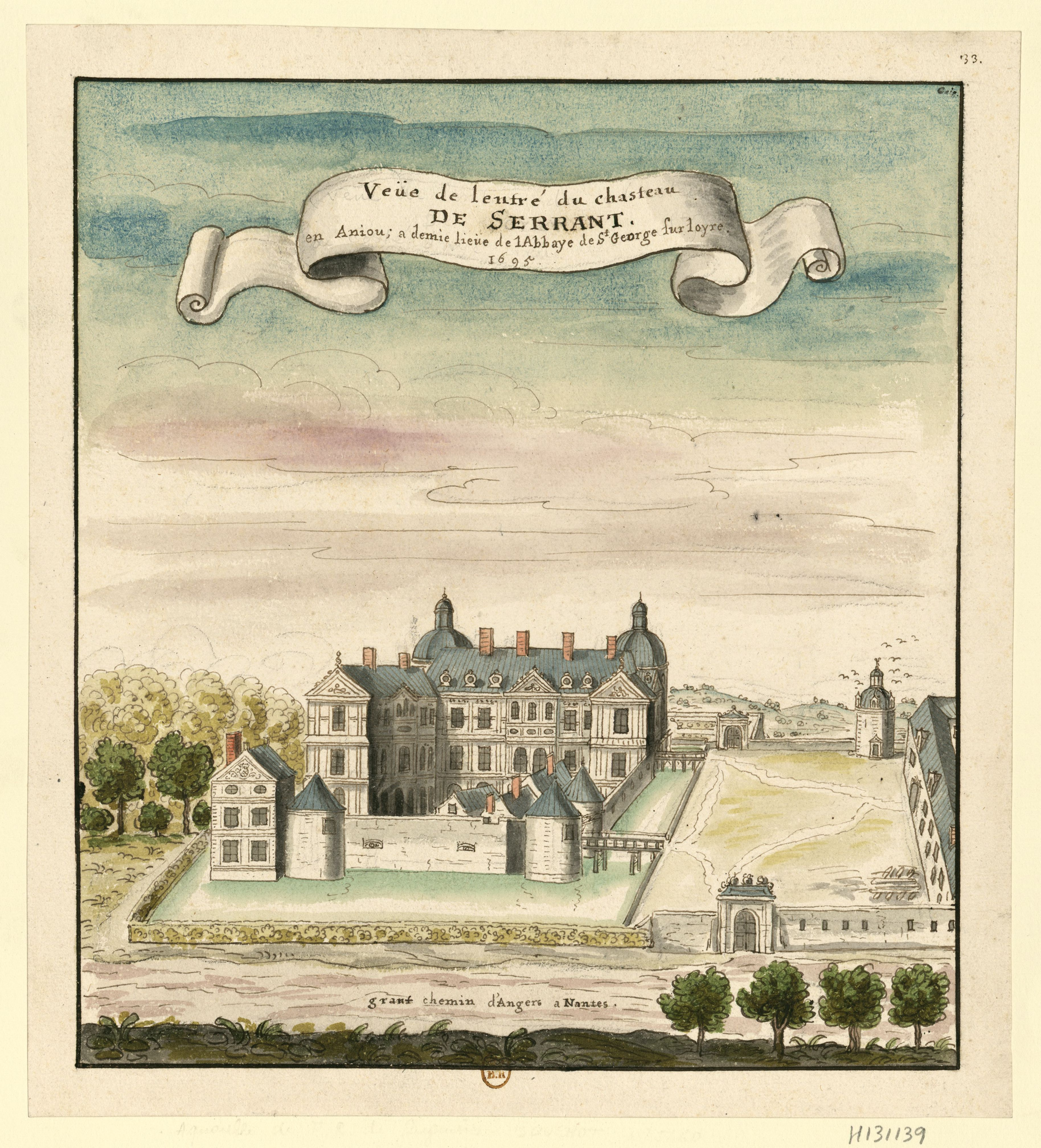
View of the château de Serrant from the entrance side in 1695, drawing by Louis Boudan
