= Brothers of Mercy =

Brothers of (Our Lady of) Mercy may refer to:

- Brothers Hospitallers of Saint John of God, a Catholic hospitaller order
- Brothers of Mercy of Our Lady of Perpetual Help, a Catholic religious institute
- Brothers of Our Lady, Mother of Mercy of Tilburg, a Dutch Catholic lay religious congregation
