= Brothers of Mercy of Our Lady of Perpetual Help =

Catholic religious institute

The Brothers of Our Lady of Mercy, or in full Brothers of Mercy of Our Lady of Perpetual Help (F.M.M.), are a Catholic religious institute.

== History ==
The institute was founded at Mechlin (Flanders, capital of the ecclesiastical province coinciding with Belgium) in 1839 by Canon Victor Scheppers (1802 - 1877) for the instruction and care of prisoners and of the sick. They were invited to S. Balbina in Perugia by Cardinal Pecci, afterwards Leo XIII, who had witnessed their work while he was nuncio in Belgium at Brussels. It was at his instance that Pius IX confirmed the institution of the brothers in 1854. A few years before, Xavier de Mérode had been appointed to a papal office which entailed the direction of the Roman prisons. Historians have documented Mérode's efforts to improve the penitentiary system in Rome. Mérode adapted some of the concepts of Belgian reformer Édouard Ducpétiaux. He also brought some of the Brothers of Mercy from Mechelen to Rome to assist in this work.

In 1855 Cardinal Manning invited them to London, where they have undertaken the care of the prisoners in Catholic reformatories and the education of the children of the poor.

They are under simple vows and the term of the novitiate is two years. They wear a black habit and scapular with a brown cross on the breast.
