= Victor Scheppers =

Belgian Roman Catholic religious leader

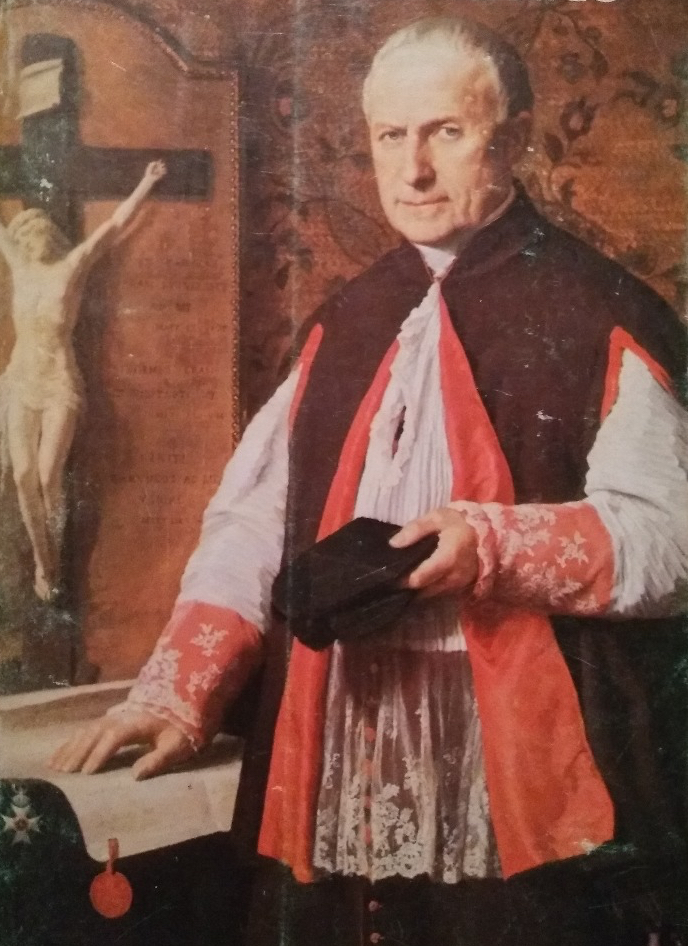
Victor Scheppers

Msgr. Victor Scheppers (25 April 1802 in Mechelen – 7 March 1877 in Mechelen) was the founder of the Brothers of Mercy of Mechelen and the Scheppersinstituut Mechelen. He was declared "venerable" by the Roman Catholic Church in March 1987. His feast day is 7 March, the date of his death.

== Biography ==
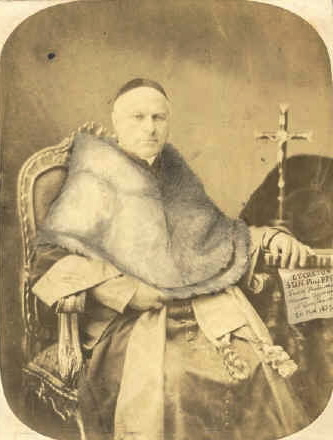
Victor Scheppers

Victor Scheppers was the youngest of four children. His parents were wealthy landowners, his father owned a brewery near Mechelen. Victor attended primary school in Mechelen and then studied in Aalst. His mother died in 1813, his sister in 1815 and his brother in 1817. He took over the management of the brewery. He made several pilgrimages to the Shrine de Notre Dame de Montaigu before deciding to become a priest. Scheppers was ordained in 1832 and celebrated his first Mass at the Cathedral of Mechelen.

During Belgium's industrial revolution, he responded to urban poverty's devastating impact on youth by dedicating himself to their support. In Mechelen, with his father's help, he founded a care home, expanding it by 1835 into a full-day school with free vocational training and Sunday education for teenagers.

== Foundation ==
Scheppers visited the prisons and directed his apostolate especially to the juvenile quarters. He developed the idea to care for and train the prisoners in order to reduce crime. However, he needed support to achieve this. During his annual pilgrimage to Scherpenheuvel, Canon Scheppers decided to found a "Merciful Brotherhood", whose main task would be the care of prisoners. The Minister of Justice of Belgium supported this activity and also promised financial support. With borrowed money Scheppers bought a house and converted it into a monastery building. In March 1838 the first two brothers - two simple craftsmen - joined this order. Engelbertus Cardinal Sterckx helped him to found his congregation and on January 25, 1839, transferred the leadership to Brother Victor Scheppers and approved the rules of the order and the robe.

In 1851 he established a day school in the monastery on the Melaan in Mechelen and expanded it into a boarding school. Soon the boarding school was known as the "Scheppersinstitut". Cardinal Pecci calls him to Perugia to open an establishment, and Bishop de Merode presents it to Pope Pius IX in 1854, who conferred on him the title of prelate of His Holiness in 1856 (Monsignor). Soon the congregation spread to England, Manitoba, Spain and the Netherlands. Later, he also worked in Africa.

A small group of brothers obtained special permission to enter the priesthood in 1949, with the obligation to respect the lay spirit of the congregation. After an extremely difficult period in the years 1970–1990, the congregation continues today in seventeen houses in Belgium, Italy, Argentina, Uruguay and Burundi.

Preliminary local investigations for Scheppers's beatification began on 6 November 1926. Victor Scheppers was declared venerable by Pope John Paul II on 16 March 1987.

== Bibliography ==
- Collective, Bishop Scheppers. Founder of the Brothers and Sisters of Our Lady of Mercy. Liege / Mechelen, Dessain, 1906, 429 pp.
