= Henri de Merode =

Count Henri Marie Ghislain de Merode (1782–1847) was a member of the Belgian Senate and writer.

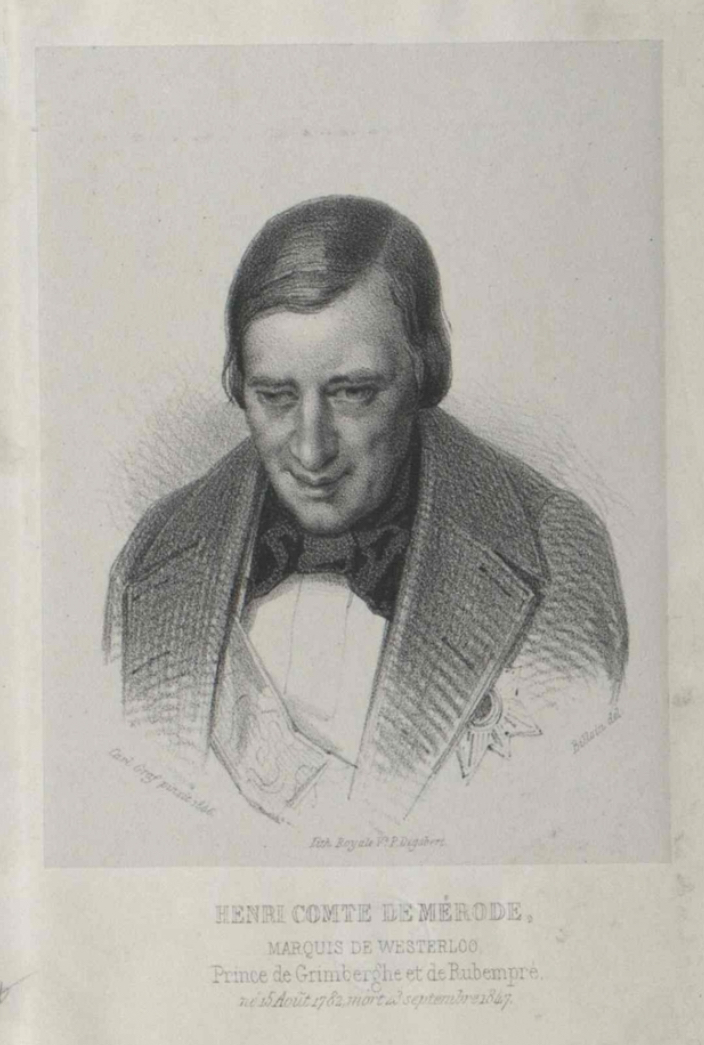
Henri de Mérode

== Life ==
Henri de Merode was born in Brussels on 15 August 1782, the eldest of the four sons of Charles de Merode (1762–1830) and Marie d'Ongnies de Mastaing, princess of Grimbergen. He inherited the titles prince of Grimbergen, count of Merode and of the Holy Roman Empire, marquis of Westerloo and prince of Rubempré. He was also awarded the titles of Grandee of Spain and Grand Cordon of the Order of Leopold. In about 1794 he fled with his father from the revolutionary French forces taking over the Austrian Netherlands and moved to elsewhere in the Holy Roman Empire. He returned to the general area of Brussles, now part of the French Republic, with his father in 1800. On 26 August 1805 he married Louise-Jeanne de Thézan du Poujol (1787–1862). His father was made mayor of Brussels (1805-1809) and member of the Senate of the French First Empire (1809–1814) and the family was therefore awarded the title of Count of the First French Empire. His father was also member of the Provisional Government of Belgium (1814–1815) under William of Orange.

Having declined to serve in public office under the United Kingdom of the Netherlands, Merode supported the aims of the Belgian Revolution, in which his younger brothers Félix and Frédéric played an active role, but sat out the fighting on an estate in France.

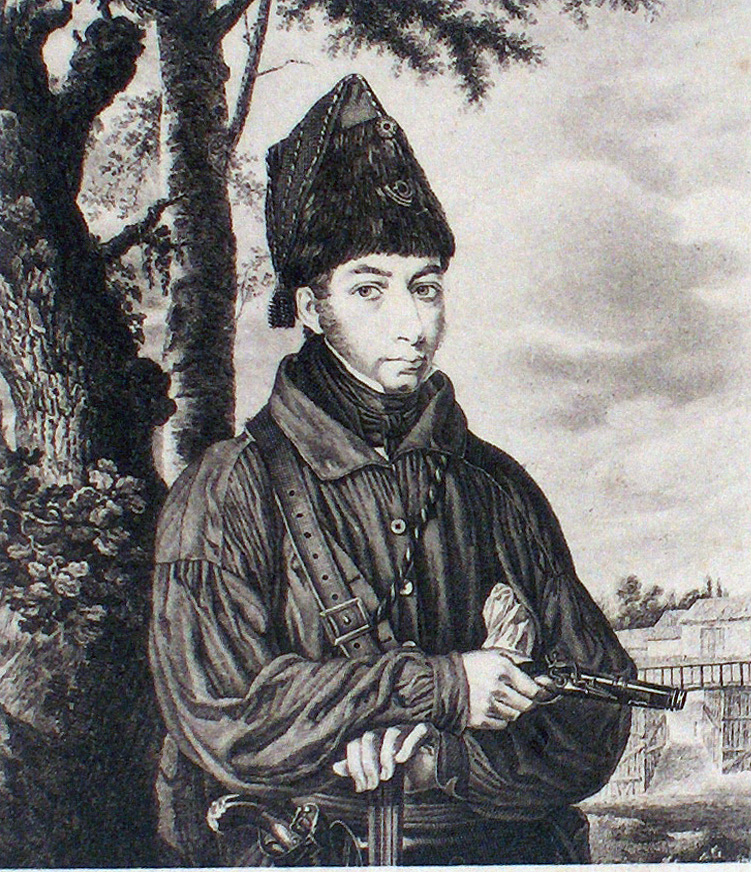
His brother Frédéric de Merode (1792-1830), killed during the Belgian Revolution.

In the 1831 Belgian general election, the first since the declaration of independence in 1830, he was elected to the Belgian Senate. The following year, his wife was appointed as lady-in-waiting to Queen Louise. In 1835, King Leopold sent him to Vienna as an extraordinary ambassador to extend condolences on the death of Francis II and congratulating Ferdinand I of Austria on his accession, while also officially communicating the birth of Leopold, Duke of Brabant (the future Leopold II of Belgium). Merode was re-elected senator in 1839 but resigned his seat. He died in Brussels on 23 September 1847.

== Family and children ==
De Merode married Louise-Jeanne de Thézan du Poujol (Paris, 14 January 1787 – Brussels, 27 April 1862) on 26 August 1806 in Paris. She was the daughter of Viscount Jean de Thézan and Françoise de Noailles.

They usually lived in the Château de Trélon, near Avesnes, in France.

They had the following children:

- Marie Joséphine Hildegarde Ghislaine ("Marie") Countess de Mérode (1820–1899); married Adrien Charles Guy Marie de Levis-Mirepoix, Duke of San Fernando Luis (1820–1886)
- Charles Antoine Ghislain, Mayor of Westerlo, Prince de Rubempré et de Grimbergen (1824–1892), Member of the Chamber of Representatives, Senator, President of the Senate and Minister of State; married Marie, Princess and Duchess of Arenberg (1830–1905) in 1849

== Works ==
- De l'Esprit de vie et de l'Esprit de mort (Paris, 1833), written with a cousin, the marquis Philippe Ernest de Beauffort
- Mémoires du feld-maréchal comte de Mérode-Westerloo, Chevalier de la Toison d'Or, Capitaine de Trabans de l'Empereur Charles VI. - 2 Volumes, Brussels, 1840
- Souvenirs
