= Mount Thabor Convent, Mechelen =

The Priory of the Holy Saviour on Mount Thabor, or more simply Mount Thabor Convent (Dutch: Thaborklooster, French: Prieuré de Mont-Thabor) was a house of Augustinian canonesses founded near the city of Mechelen in the second half of the 15th century. The convent was burnt down in 1572, during the Spanish Fury at Mechelen, and the community was temporarily disbanded in 1578 but was refounded within the city walls of Mechelen in 1585. The convent was suppressed in 1783, under Emperor Joseph II, and from 1844 a school operated on the site. Since 1851 it has housed the Scheppersinstituut Mechelen.
