= House of Merode =

European noble family

Coordinates: 50.799°N 6.388°E

- Noble family
- Blazon: Or four pallets gules, a bordure engrailed azure
- Country: Germany; Belgium; Netherlands; France; Austria
- Founder: Werner I von Merode 1195-1278
- Current head: Charles-Guillaume, Marquess of Westerlo, Prince of Rubempré and of Grimbergen, Prince of Merode
- Titles: Freiherr of Merode (1473); Baron of Duffel; Baron of Frentz; Baron of Pietersheim; Baron of Ronse (Renaix); Viscount of Montfort; Viscount of Wavreumont; Count of Merode (Holy Roman Empire); Count de Merode (First French Empire) (1809); Count of Oignies (1647); Count of Waroux (1622); Marquess of Deinze (1632); Marquess of Trélon (1626); Marquess of Westerlo (1626, reconfirmed 1823); Grandee of Spain; Prince of Everberg (reconfirmed 1823); Prince of Rubempré (1704 reconfirmed 1823); Prince of Grimbergen (reconfirmed 1827); Prince of Merode (1930)
- Motto: « Plus d'honneur que d'honneurs » (More honour than honours)
- Estates: Schloss Merode; Castle of Westerlo; Hôtel de Mérode-Westerloo (Brussels); Hôtel de Mérode-Deynze (Brussels); Château d'Ancy-le-Franc; Castle of Everberg; Castle of Grimbergen; Castle of Ham-sur-Heure; Burg Odenkirchen; Castle of Pietersheim; Castle of Loverval; Castle of Rixensart; Castle of Ronse; Château de Serrant; Castle of Solre-sur-Sambre; Château de Trélon
- Cadet branches: Merode-Westerloo; Merode-Houffalize; Merode-Pietersheim; Merode-Deinze; Merode-Montfort

The House of Merode is one of the most prominent families of the Belgian nobility. It originates from the village of Merode, which is now in the municipality of Langerwehe in Germany. Over the past five centuries, different branches bore noble titles and had estates on the territories of the modern-day states of Germany, Belgium, the Netherlands, France and Austria. Through marriage, the house is connected with many prominent European noble families. The House of Merode played an important role in the history of the Southern Netherlands and the Kingdom of Belgium.

The surname of the family and the name of the house is sometimes written de Mérode in French. The name is spelled de Merode or van Merode in Dutch and von Merode in German. The coat of arms of the House of Merode is blazoned as: Or four pallets gules, a bordure engrailed azure. The motto of the house is Plus d'honneur que d'honneurs in French and Meer eer dan eerbetoon in Dutch.

== Origin ==
The family stems from the village of Merode in what is now Germany. Merode is located in the vicinity of the city of Düren, which lies between Aachen and Köln and was once part of the Duchy of Jülich. Today, it is part of the municipality of Langerwehe in the state of North Rhine-Westphalia. A branch of the Merode family still owns the castle (Schloss Merode) from which the family's name derives.

Originally, the Merode family had the rank of Freiherr of the Holy Roman Empire. During the Middle Ages, the family had possessions and influence in Köln and in the Rhineland, and it belonged to the reichsunmittelbar aristocracy. They supported the monastery of Schwarzenbroich, which was also the burial place for the deceased members of the family.

From the sons of Werner III von Merode (†1278), two branches of the house descended. The oldest branch was called 'Scheiffart von Merode'. The 'Scheiffart' or 'German' branch became extinct in 1733. The younger branch descends from Werner IV von Merode (†1316). This house also split into different branches, of which the branch of the Marquess of Westerloo, called 'de Merode-Westerloo', would become the most famous. The present-day 'Princes de Merode' in Belgium descend from the latter branch via Charles-Guillaume de Merode-Westerloo (1762–1830) and three of his four sons.

== History ==
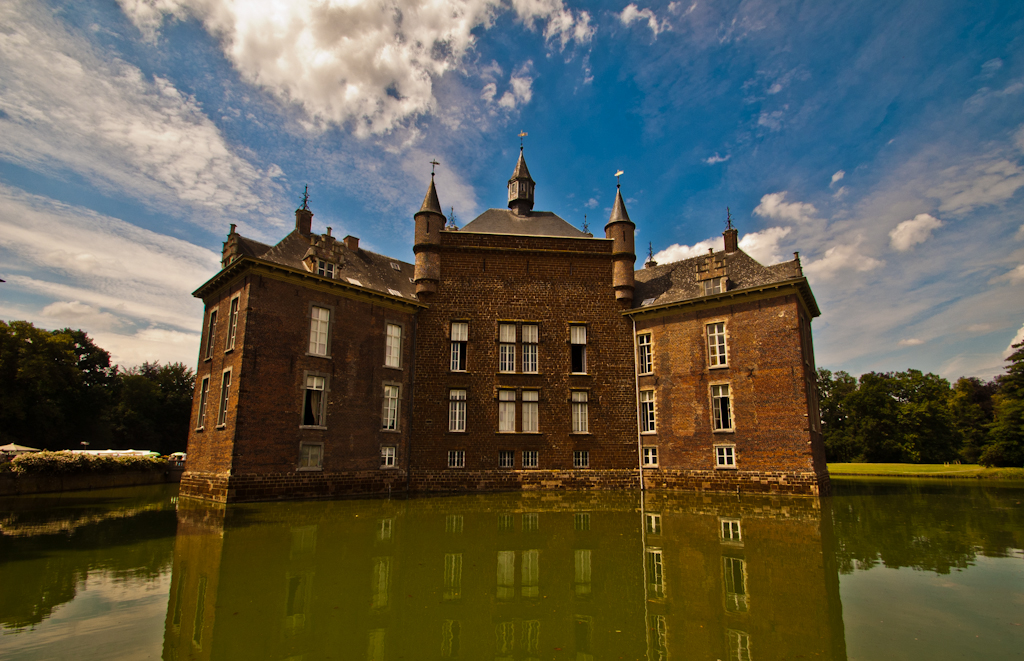
Merode Castle in Westerlo

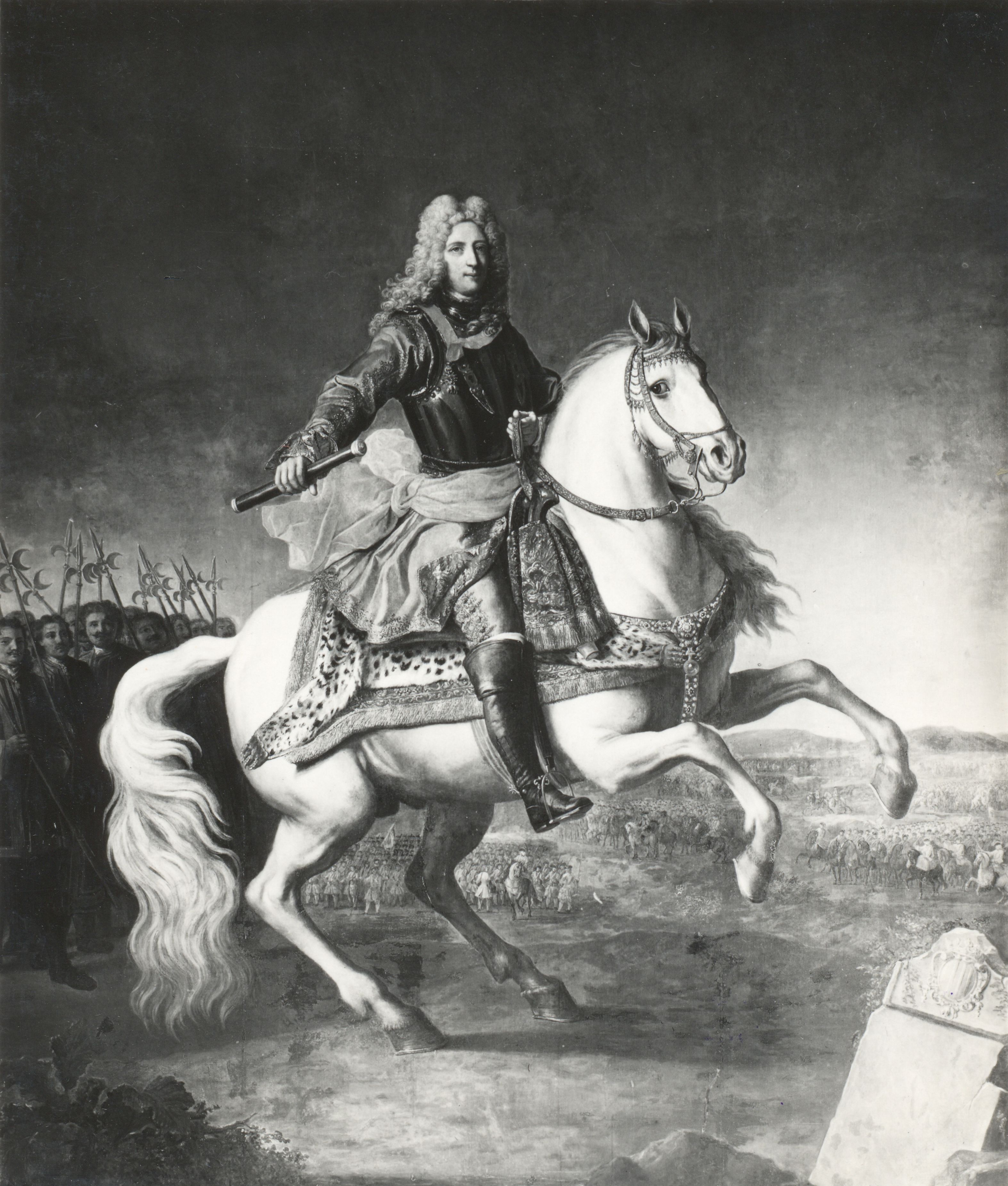
Jean de Merode, 5th Marquess of Westerloo

From the 14th century onwards, a branch of the Merode family gained power and possessions in the Duchy of Brabant and the Prince-Bishopric of Liège, on the territory of present-day Belgium. At that time, these territories belonged to the Burgundian Netherlands and later to the Habsburg Netherlands.

The marriage of Richard de Merode with Margareth van Wezemaal marked a new age in the family's history. Due to this marriage, the house of Merode inherited important seigniories in Brabant, such as Westerloo and the County of Olen. Jean I de Merode married Adelheid van Hoorn in 1451 and brought Gheel, Diepenbeek and Duffel into the possession of the family. Through these and other marriages, the Merode family became one of the most important noble families in the Duchy of Brabant.

Jean II de Merode held the position of Lord Chamberlain of Philip the Handsome. He was succeeded by his son Jean III. After his death in 1551 his heirs ordered a monumental sepulchre for him and his wife that was made by the Antwerp sculptor Cornelis Floris. It stands in the church of Gheel and was erected in 1554.

The Eighty Years War greatly damaged the possessions of the Merode family. In the more prosperous era after the Twelve Years' Truce, the family's fortune grew again. In 1626, the title of Marquis of Westerloo was granted to Philippe I de Merode by King Philip IV of Spain. It was his great-grandson, Jean-Philippe-Eugène de Merode, Marquis of Westerloo, who would become one of the most illustrious descendants of the house: He is known as the Feld-Maréchal de Merode and became a knight in the order of the Golden Fleece, having served as an important military commander.

In the 18th century, the branch of Merode-Westerloo acquired wealth and power due to the extinction of other branches of the house (Merode-Houffalize, Merode-Deinze, Merode-Montfort, Merode-Calvo) and a few very advantageous marriages.

Through marriage of Philippe-François de Mérode with Louise-Brigitte de Rubempré in 1704, they acquired the domains and titles of 'Princes of Rubempré' and 'Prince of Everberg'.

During the French Revolution, the Austrian Netherlands were invaded by French republican troops and were incorporated into the French Republic. The domains of the family were confiscated and noble privileges were abolished. The family fled to Germany for a while. It was only after the declaration of the French Empire by Napoleon in 1804 that the family could regain their domains and some of their titles. A re-introduction of the noble privileges, however, would never be achieved. As a result, members of the Merode family became prominently engaged in politics and diplomacy. Charles-Guillaume-Ghislain de Merode-Westerloo had been active as a minister under Austrian rule since 1787 and would hold several other important political posts under successive regimes, such as mayor of Brussels in 1805, and senator of the French Empire in 1809. In 1815, he became Grand-Marshal of the court of King William I of the Netherlands, when the Belgian provinces were part of the United Kingdom of the Netherlands.

His sons, Henri, Félix, Frédéric and Werner would play an important role in the Belgian revolution and in the political life of the Kingdom of Belgium. Frédéric de Merode became a new national hero when he was killed in the battle near Berchem during the Belgian revolution, while Félix de Merode became an important member of the Provisional Government of Belgium and the Belgian National Congress. After the first Belgian legislative elections, Henri de Merode became a senator, while his brothers Félix and Werner both became members of parliament.

The descendants of Henri, Félix and Werner de Merode would form different branches, whose descendants would continue to play an important role in Belgian politics and diplomacy.

== Wealth ==
The family is known for its large estates and old castles. In 2014, the House of Merode-Westerloo sold 1,476 hectares of privately owned land to the Flemish region. Among the castles owned are Merode, Westerlo, Trelon, Serrant, Rixensart, Everberg, Solre-sur-Sambre and Neffe.

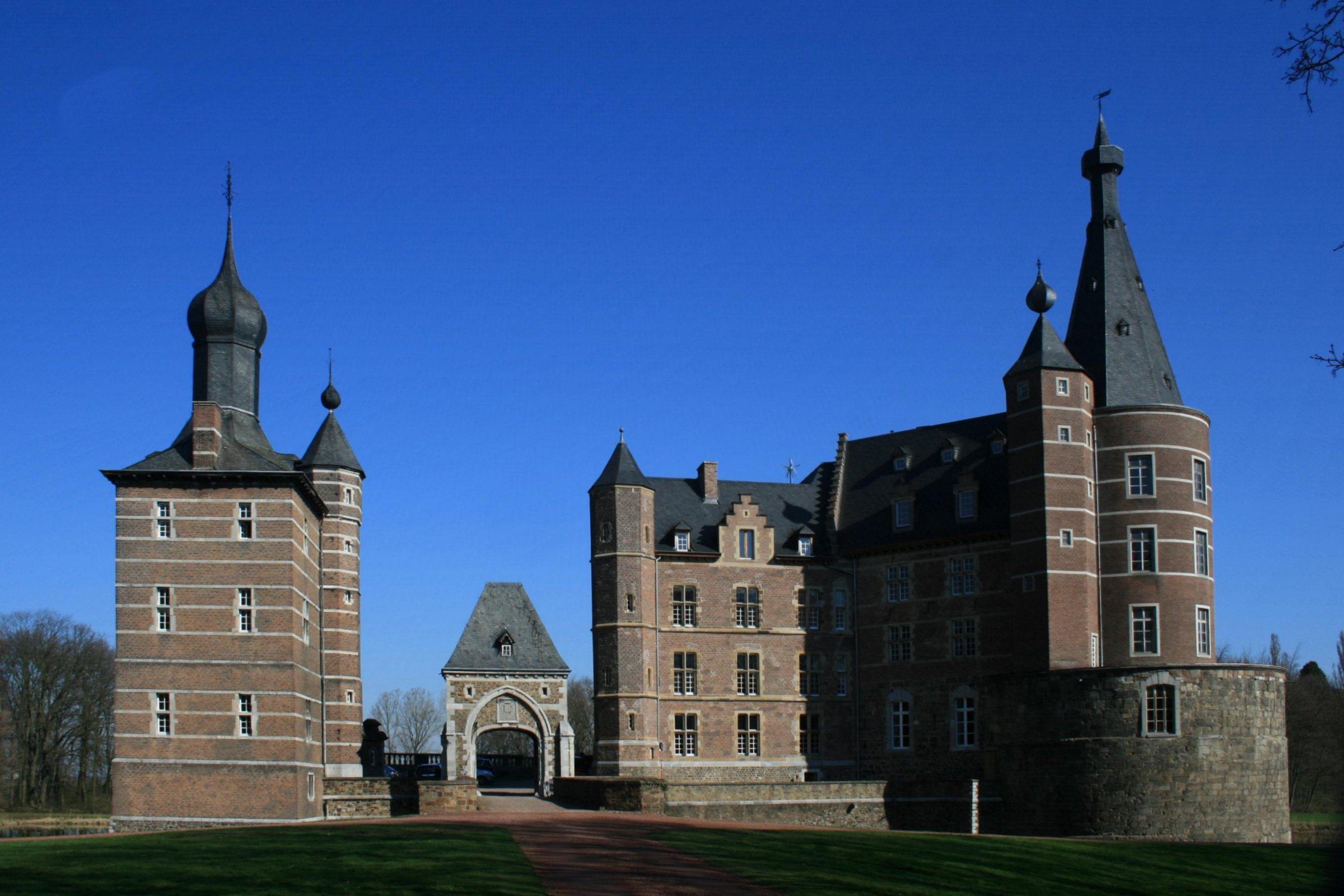
Schloss Merode

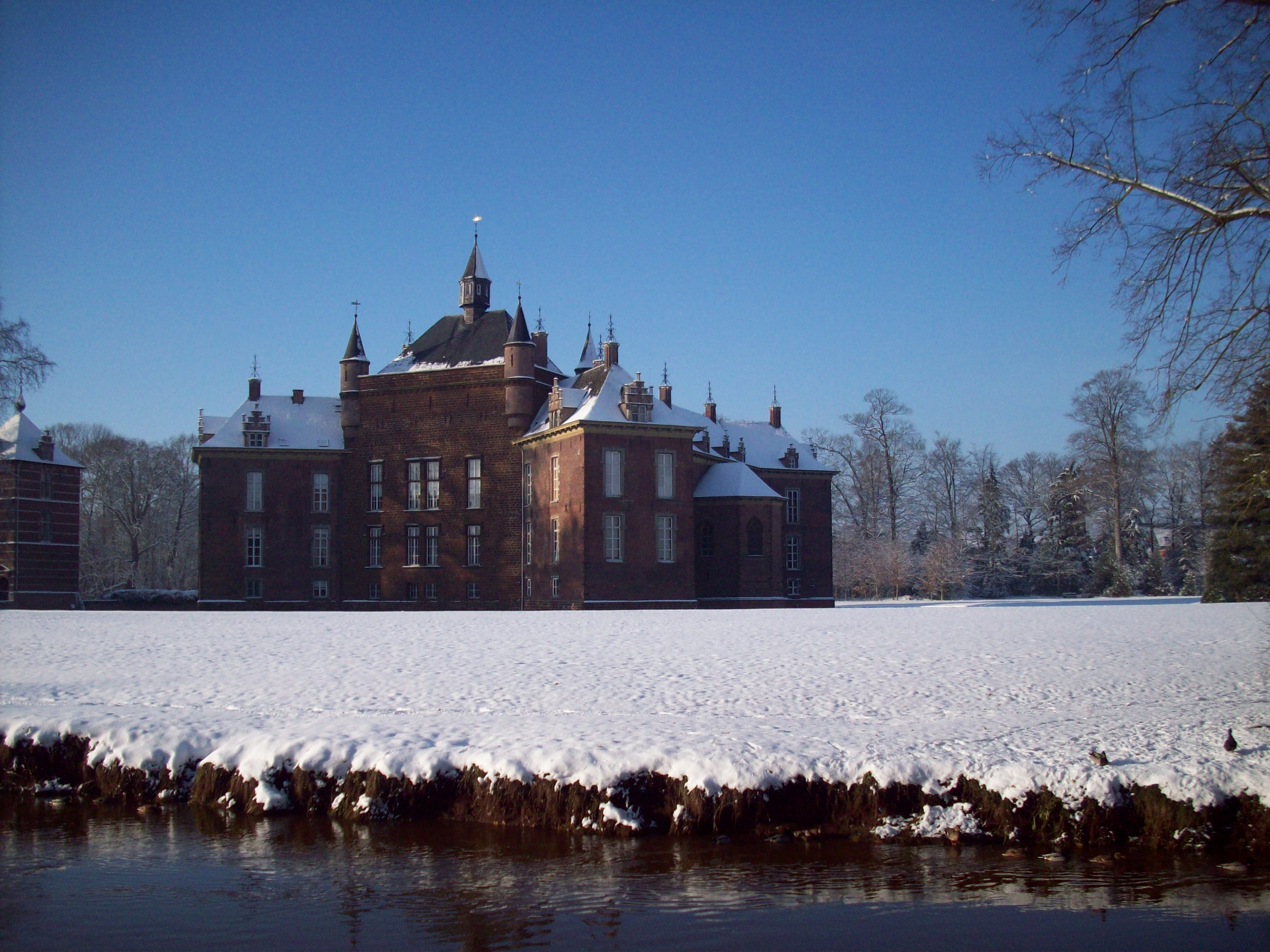
Westerlo

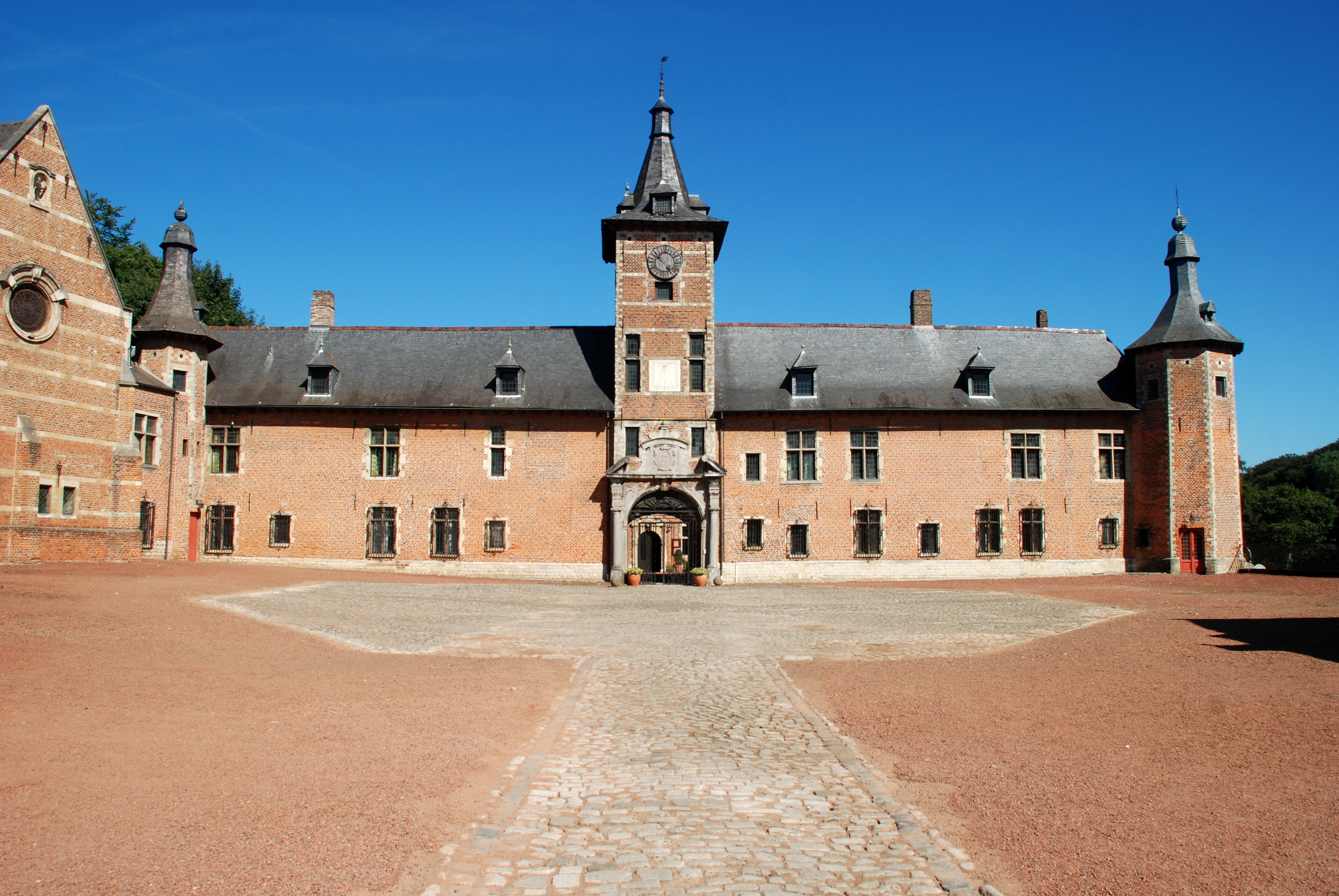
Rixensart

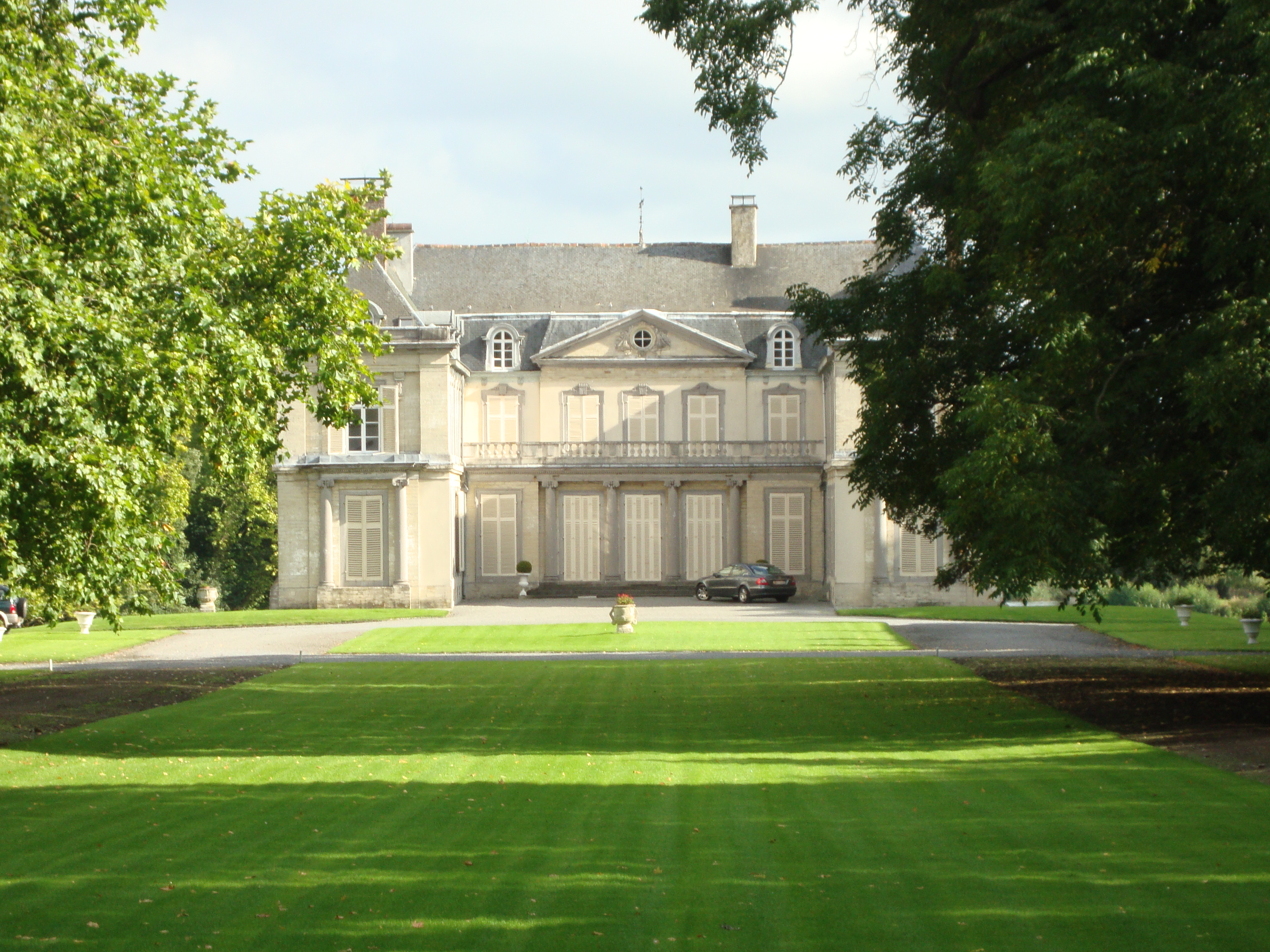
Everberg

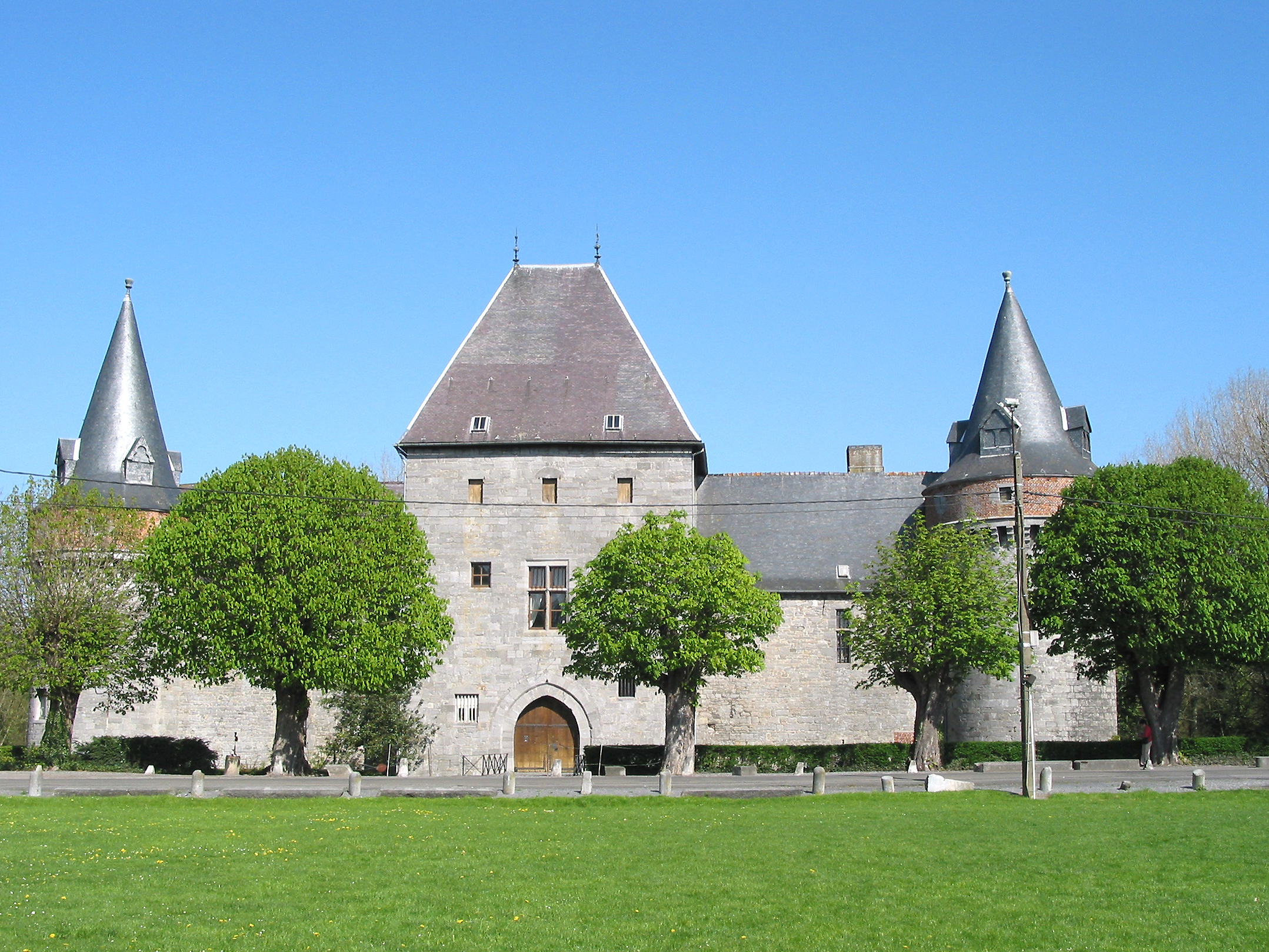
Solre-sur-Sambre

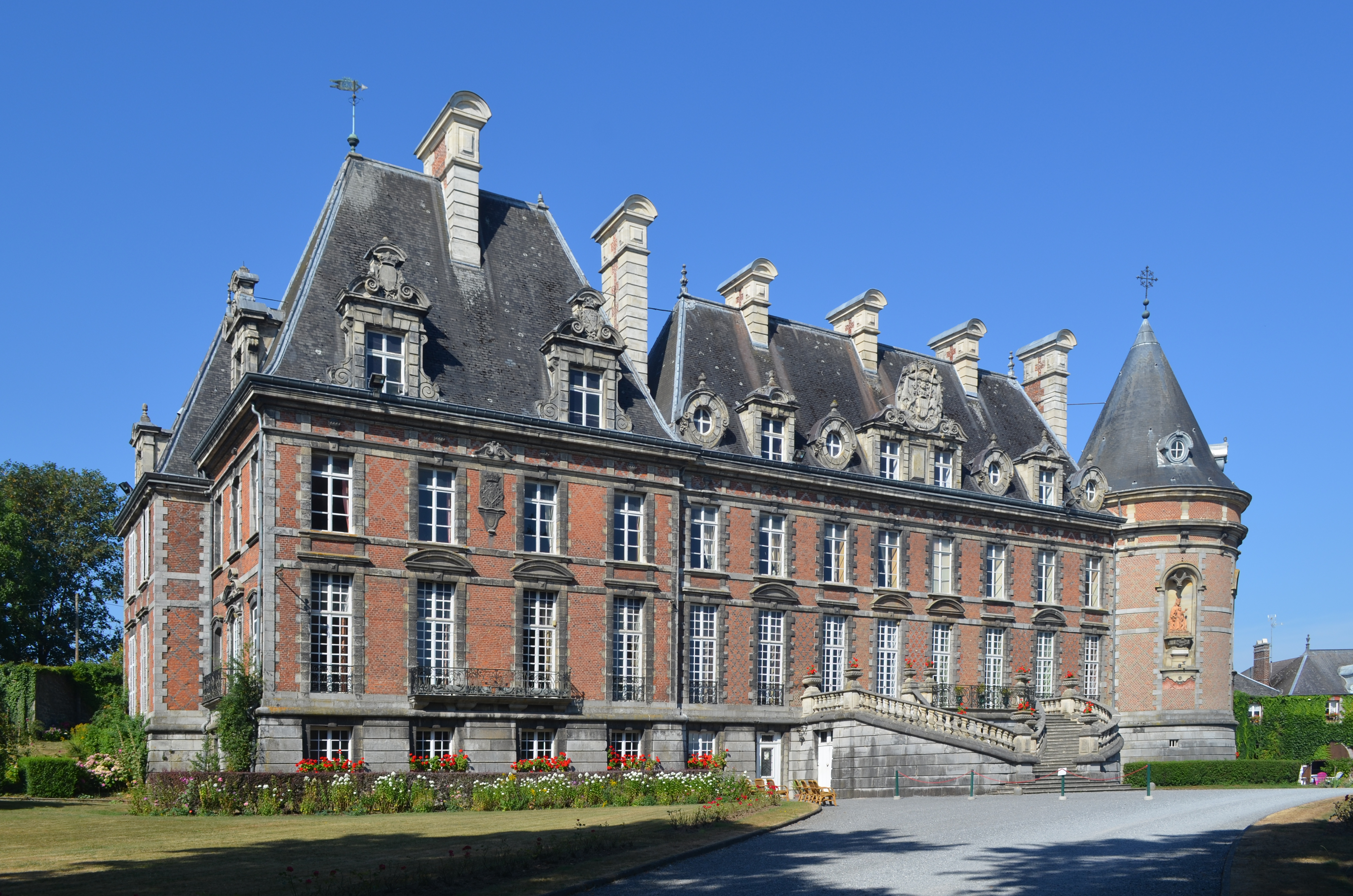
Trélon

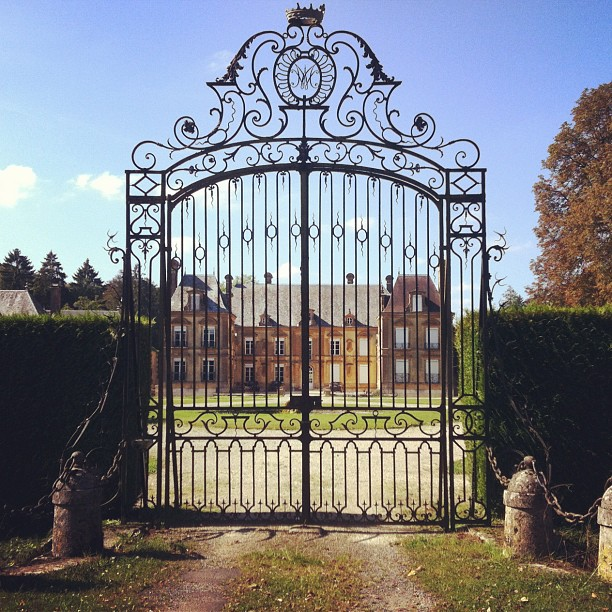
Guignicourt sur Vence

== Notable members of Henri's branch ==
- Henri de Merode married Jeanne-Louise de Thézan Poujol (1787–1862).
- Charles-Antoine-Ghislain (1824–1892) succeeded him and married Princess Marie d'Arenberg (1830–1905).
- Their son Henri de Merode (1856–1908) married Princess Nathalie de Croy (1863–1957).
- His sister Countess Jeanne de Merode (1853–1944), unmarried, philanthropist.
- Charles de Merode (1887–1977) married Marguerite de Laguiche (1895–1988) and had no children.

== Notable members of Felix's branch ==
Upon the death of Charles de Merode in 1977, this line became the senior branch of the House of Merode.

- Philippe Felix de Merode
- Bishop Xavier de Merode (1820–1874), son of Felix, and minister of Pope Pius IX
- Prince Emmanuel de Merode, noted conservationist, Director of the Virunga National Park in the Congo; married to Kenyan paleontologist Louise Leakey.
- Princess Baudouin de Merode, née Nathalie van den Abeele (1948), widowed first wife of Baron Guy de Bassompierre, lady-in-waiting of Queen Paola of Belgium since 1997.

== Notable members of Werner's branch ==
Werner de Merode (1797–1840), founder of the present younger branch of the family, married in 1818 with Countess Victoire de Spangen d'Uyternesse. Among their descendants are:

- The Aosta branch of the Italian royal family, by the marriage of Louise de Merode (1819–1868) (sister of the penultimate Merode of Ham-sur-Heure) with Carlo Emmanuele dal Pozzo, 5th Prince of Cisterna, and by the marriage of their daughter Maria Vittoria dal Pozzo with the founder of the Aosta branch: Prince Amedeo of Savoy, Duke of Aosta and sometime King Amadeo I of Spain.
- Margherita, Archduchess of Austria-Este, mother of Lorenz, Archduke of Austria-Este, husband of Princess Astrid of Belgium, and therefore of their children, who are princes of Belgium.
- The princely family of Monaco, by the marriage of Antoinette de Merode (1828–1864) (another sister of the penultimate Merode of Ham-sur-Heure) with Prince Charles III of Monaco, founder of Monte Carlo, ancestor of Albert II of Monaco.
- The House of Arenberg, by the marriage of Marie-Ghislaine (1830–1892) with the Prince de Merode; Antoine, Duke of Arenberg, was their grandson.
- Jean de Merode (1864–1933), lieutenant colonel, Grand Marshal of the Court of Belgium, received from King Albert I in 1928 the title of Prince de Merode, which was extended shortly thereafter to all family members.
- Their son, Amaury de Merode (1902–1980), was Grand Marshal of the Court of King Leopold III, president of the Royal Automobile Club of Belgium, and president of the Federation Internationale de l'Automobile (FIA). He married Princess Marie-Claire de Croy (1907–2000).
- Their great-grandson Frederic de Merode (1911–1958), president of the Red Cross of Belgium.
- Their great-grandson Werner de Merode (1914–1995), Belgian diplomat.
- Their great-great-grandson Alexandre de Merode (1934–2002), vice president of the International Olympic Committee (IOC), president of the IOC Medical Commission, founding chairman of Sportel in Monaco, president of the Royal Association of Historic Houses and Gardens of Belgium, chairman of various sports federations and president of the Centre d'Oeuvre de Merode.
- Victurnienne Ghislaine Françoise Renée de Mérode, married to count Charles John d'Oultremont, nephew of William I of the Netherlands.

== Titles of the family ==
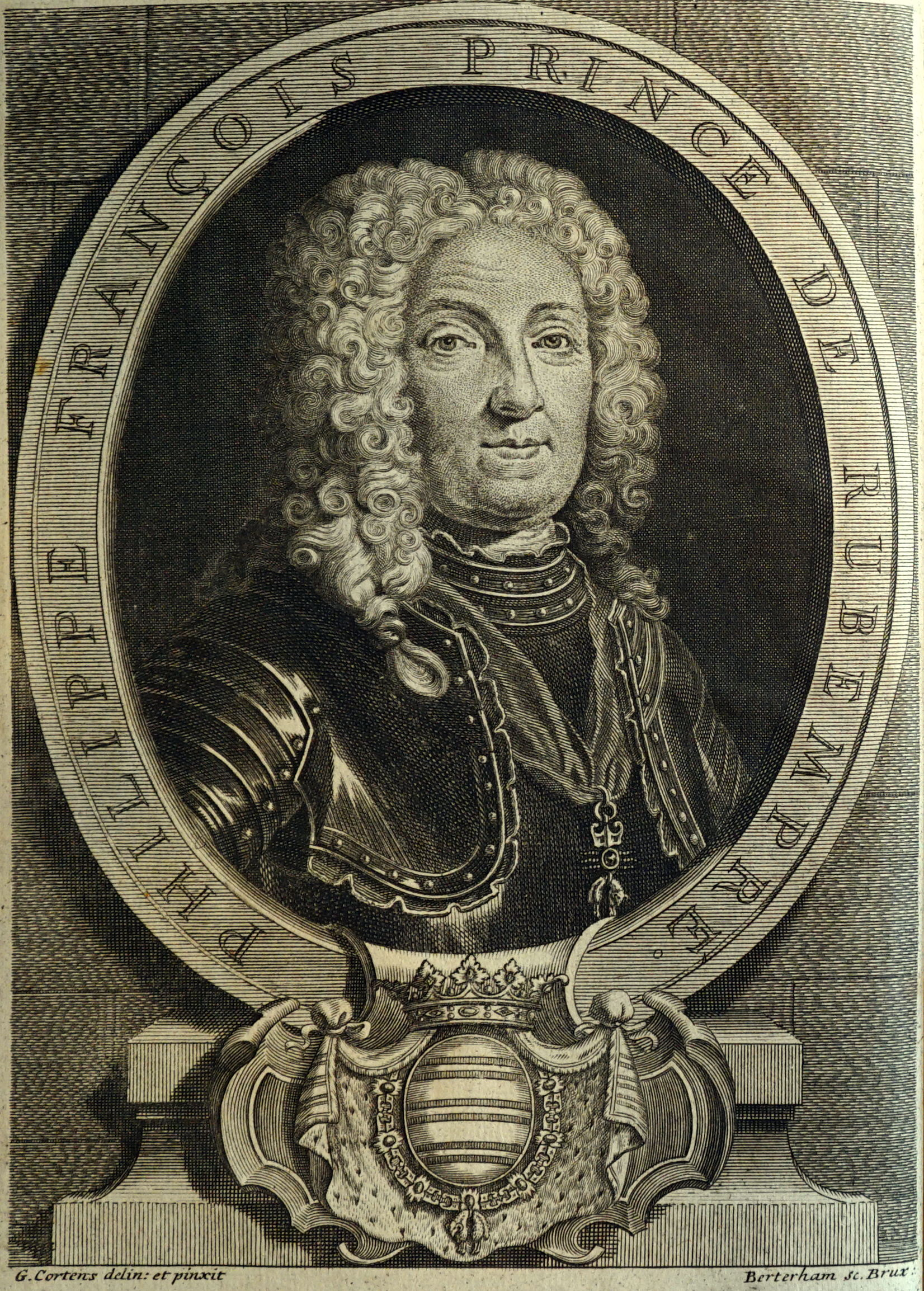
Philippe-François de Mérode, 2nd Prince of Rubempré

Some members of the House of Merode carried the title of Count from the fifteenth century, while a branch had the title of Baron of the Holy Roman Empire in the mid-fifteenth century and gained the title of Prince in 1759.

Philippe, Count of Merode (1594–1638), was the first Marquis of Westerloo.

The House of Merode bears the following titles:

- Prince of Rubempré:
  - Incorporated by marriage by Philippe-François de Mérode, 2nd Prince of Rubempré in 1704.
  - Recognition by the Kingdom of Belgium in 1846.
- Prince of Everberghe in the Holy Roman Empire (1759)
- Prince of Everberghe in the Kingdom of the Netherlands (1827)
- Prince of Grimberghe in the Kingdom of Belgium (1842)
- Prince de/van Merode in the Kingdom of Belgium (1929)

== Gallery ==
Arms of the House of Merode: Or four pallets gules, a bordure engrailed azure.

Arms of the House of Scheiffart von Merode: Or four pallets gules.

== See also ==
- Castle of Westerlo
- Château de Serrant, Residence of the head of the house of Merode, Charles-Guillaume, Prince de Merode.
- Frédéric de Merode on the French-language Wikipedia
- Lords and margraves of Bergen op Zoom
- Merode Altarpiece by Robert Campin, formerly owned by the family
- Recent genealogy of the House of Merode on the French-language Wikipedia

== Sources ==
- Martin, Georges (1999). Histoire et généalogie de la maison de Merode. Lyon.
- Domsta, Hans J. (1981). Geschichte der Fürsten von Merode im Mittelalter | Beiträge zur Geschichte des Dürener Landes Düren, 16. Düren.
