= Guillaume Bautru =

French writer (1588–1665)

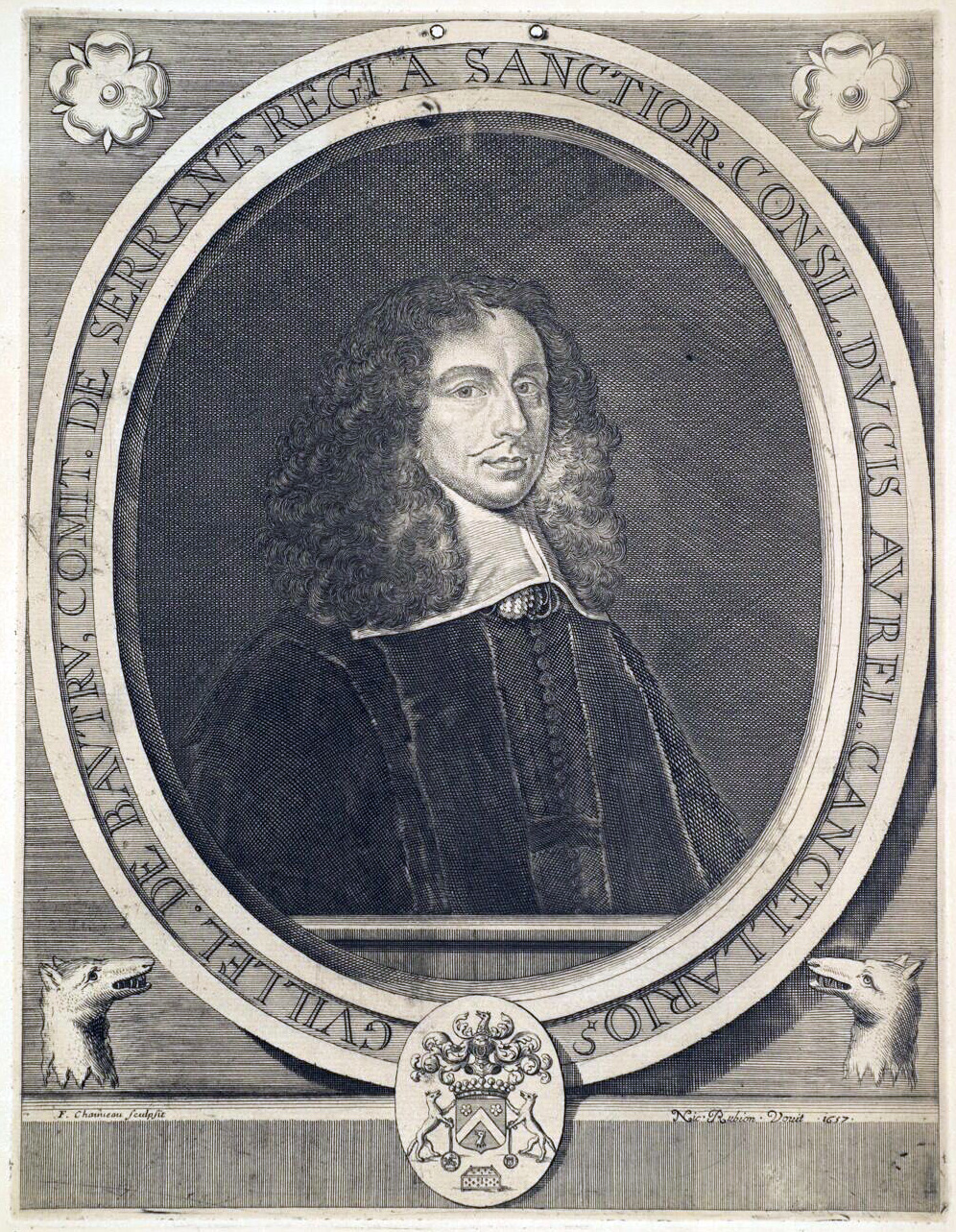
Guillaume Bautru (1657)

Guillaume Bautru, comte de Serrant (1588 in Angers – 7 March 1665 in Paris) was a French satirical poet, court favourite and a protégé and diplomatic agent of Cardinal Richelieu.

== Biography ==
He was lord of Louvaines, Conseiller d'État under Louis XIII and Louis XIV, herald of ambassadors in the king's court, minister plenipotentiary and ambassador to the archduchess of Flanders, and king's envoy to Spain, England and the Duchy of Savoy. He was also one of the founder members of the Académie française, to which he was elected in 1634.

Bautru purchased the Château de Serrant in 1636 and began enlarging it, work which was completed by his son.
