= Scheppersinstituut Mechelen =

School in Mechelen, Belgium

Coordinates: 51.0286°N 4.4748°E

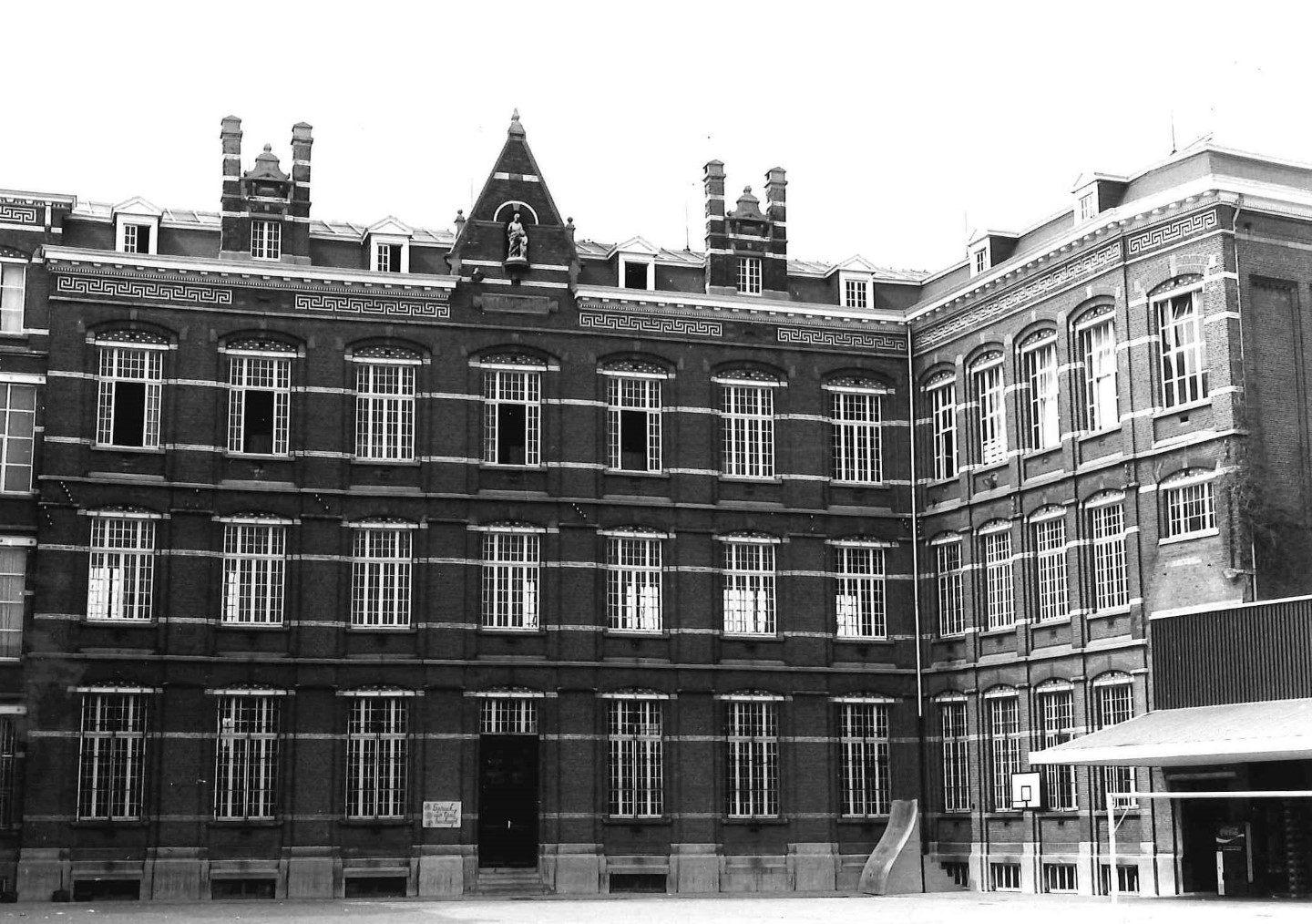

The Scheppersinstituut Mechelen is a primary and secondary school in the city of Mechelen in Belgium.

The school was founded in 1851 by Mechlinian priest Victor Scheppers in what until 1783 had been Mount Thabor Convent. Parts of the building are protected as a heritage site.
