= Abortion doping =

Rumoured practice of cheating in sports

Abortion doping is a rumoured practice of purposely inducing pregnancy specifically for athletic performance-enhancing benefits, and then aborting the pregnancy. Rumours and allegations began during international sporting events in the mid-twentieth century, and a number of doctors and scientists have repeated claims about it, but it remains unproven, and is often regarded as a myth.

== Potential physical benefits ==
Hormonal and other changes in pregnancy affect physical performance. In the first three months it is known that a woman's body produces a natural surplus of red blood cells, which are well supplied with oxygen-carrying hemoglobin, in order to support the growing fetus. Other potential advantages are obtained from the surge in hormones that pregnancy induces, predominantly progesterone and estrogen, but also testosterone, which could increase muscle strength. Increases in hormones like relaxin, which loosens the hip joints to prepare for childbirth, may have a performance-enhancing effect on joint mobility. Peter Larkins, an official of the Australian Sports Medicine Association, opined that the advantages of abortion doping would be "far outweighed by the drawbacks of morning sickness and fatigue" which are common in early pregnancy.

Although female athletes often become pregnant during their careers and immediately before major sports events, and although many athletes have reported increased performance while being pregnant, "abortion doping" refers specifically to deliberate pregnancy with the express aim to increase performance. The stigma and beliefs surrounding abortion doping have been found to have a detrimental effect on female athletes who become pregnant during an active career.

== Claims ==
Western media outlets began accusing Soviet countries of abortion doping as early as the 1956 Summer Olympics, and allegations were raised again at the 1964 Summer Olympics. Rumours of abortion doping continued throughout the 1970s and 1980s, predominately aimed at East German athletes.

Concerns around pregnancy as a doping method were discussed in an IOC Medical Commission meeting on February 16, 1984, though the idea was dismissed as members did not feel “that such a procedure would be of benefit to the female athletes”.

On May 22, 1988, Finnish doctor Risto Erkola reportedly told the Sunday Mirror "It's horrible and immoral. Now that drug testing is routine, pregnancy is becoming the favourite way of getting an edge on competitors". The second sentence of Erkola's comment is frequently cited in discussions, reports and papers on abortion doping. According to the fact-checking website Snopes.com, media reports following this claim were skeptical of it, and "it is not clear if Erkola would have had any first-hand knowledge of Soviet doping practices". In the same Sunday Mirror story, Prof. Renate Huch (misspelled "Hoch" by Sunday Mirror) of Geneva, who deals with artificial insemination, said that "the problem has become so widespread now that [we] made a rule never to help a woman athlete if she wants to get pregnant purely and simply to win a race."

On the First Permanent World Conference on Anti-Doping in Sport held in June 1988, Prince Alexandre de Merode, the vice-president of the International Olympic Committee (IOC), supported reports that Eastern European athletes were getting artificially inseminated and then aborting two to three months later in an attempt to boost athletic performance on the First Permanent World Conference on Anti-Doping in Sport. Merode said he knew a Swiss doctor who performed the procedure. Dr. Robert Voy of the United States Olympic Committee dismissed such claims as a "ludicrous myth".

In the Textbook in Physiology and Pathophysiology (1999), Dr. Paul-Erik Paulev, a Danish professor of physiology at the University of Copenhagen, wrote that "in some countries female athletes have become pregnant for 2-3 months, in order to improve their performance just following an abortion." Dr. Paulev's comment is also frequently cited in discussions on abortion doping; his comments were first made in a self-published document that contains no references for its assertions regarding abortion doping.

In November 1994, a person claiming to be Olga Karasyova, who won a gold medal in gymnastics at the 1968 Summer Olympics, gave an interview with German television station RTL Television, in which she said that abortion doping was widespread among Soviet athletes in the 1970s, and that girls as young as 14 were being forced to have sex with their coaches. When contacted by various newspapers for comment, Karasyova said the person who had given the interviews was an imposter. In 1997, Karasyova successfully sued the Russian newspaper "AIDS-Info" for libel after they published references to the 1994 story. Despite her legal victory, the original interviews attributed to her continue to be reported as facts by some third parties.

As of 2002, Snopes.com categorises abortion doping as "unproven", concluding that "abortion doping claims, specifically, have their roots in Cold War era rumors, are confirmed only by a single dubious case, are buttressed by speculative science, and are largely amplified in recent years by anti-abortion groups." Snopes accuse anti-abortion groups of selective reporting and using poorly sourced arguments when writing articles about the subject. Feminist Germaine Greer wrote in 2007 that "there is no real evidence" that abortion doping has ever been done, and British health journalist Peta Bea found in 2009 that "evidence that it occurred has never been substantiated".

== Legality ==
The practice is not considered illegal by the IOC. Prince Alexandre de Merode has stated the organisation does not "police motherhood". Abortion doping is not on the World Anti-Doping Agency's current list of prohibited substances or methods.

== Fictional coverage ==
The issue is addressed in season two of the Finnish-German crime drama television series Arctic Circle.

== See also ==
- Blood doping
