= Alexandre de Mérode =

Belgian sports executive (1934–2002)

Prince Alexandre de Merode (May 24, 1934 – November 19, 2002) was a member of the Belgian princely House of Merode and was the head of drug testing policy for the International Olympic Committee (IOC) until his death.

Merode was born in Etterbeek, Belgium.

Merode's position at the IOC was not without criticism. Following allegations of doping at the 1984 Summer Olympics, samples from suspected drug cheats were never actually tested. The prince claimed that the paperwork was accidentally discarded when the Los Angeles organizing committee converted his temporary office back into a suite immediately after the closing ceremony; however, he has been accused of deliberately destroying the evidence.

Following record-shattering performances by Chinese female swimmers in the 1990s and a doping scandal during the 1998 Tour de France, international sport created the World Anti-Doping Agency, effectively removing control of drug testing from the IOC and Merode.

In 1998, Merode backed up claims that certain athletes were using the controversial abortion doping procedure for performance-enhancing benefits; however, he did not provide any proof.

In May 2000, he tendered his resignation as head of the IOC medical commission; however, he withdrew his resignation when IOC president Juan Antonio Samaranch asked him to stay.

He died of lung cancer on November 19, 2002. He never married.
