= Jean Philippe Eugène de Mérode =

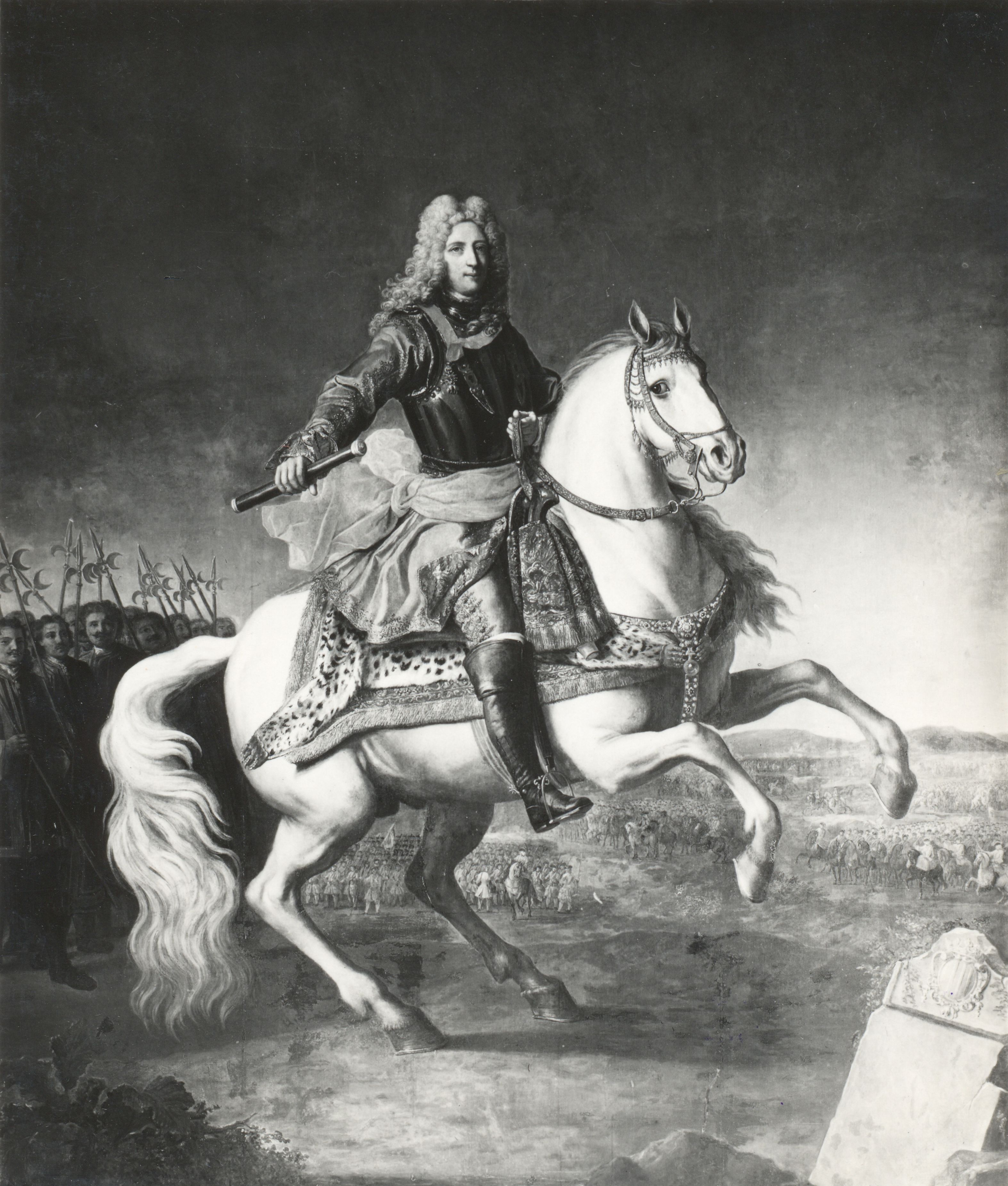
Equestrian portrait of Jean-Philippe-Eugène de Merode-Westerloo by J. van Schuppen

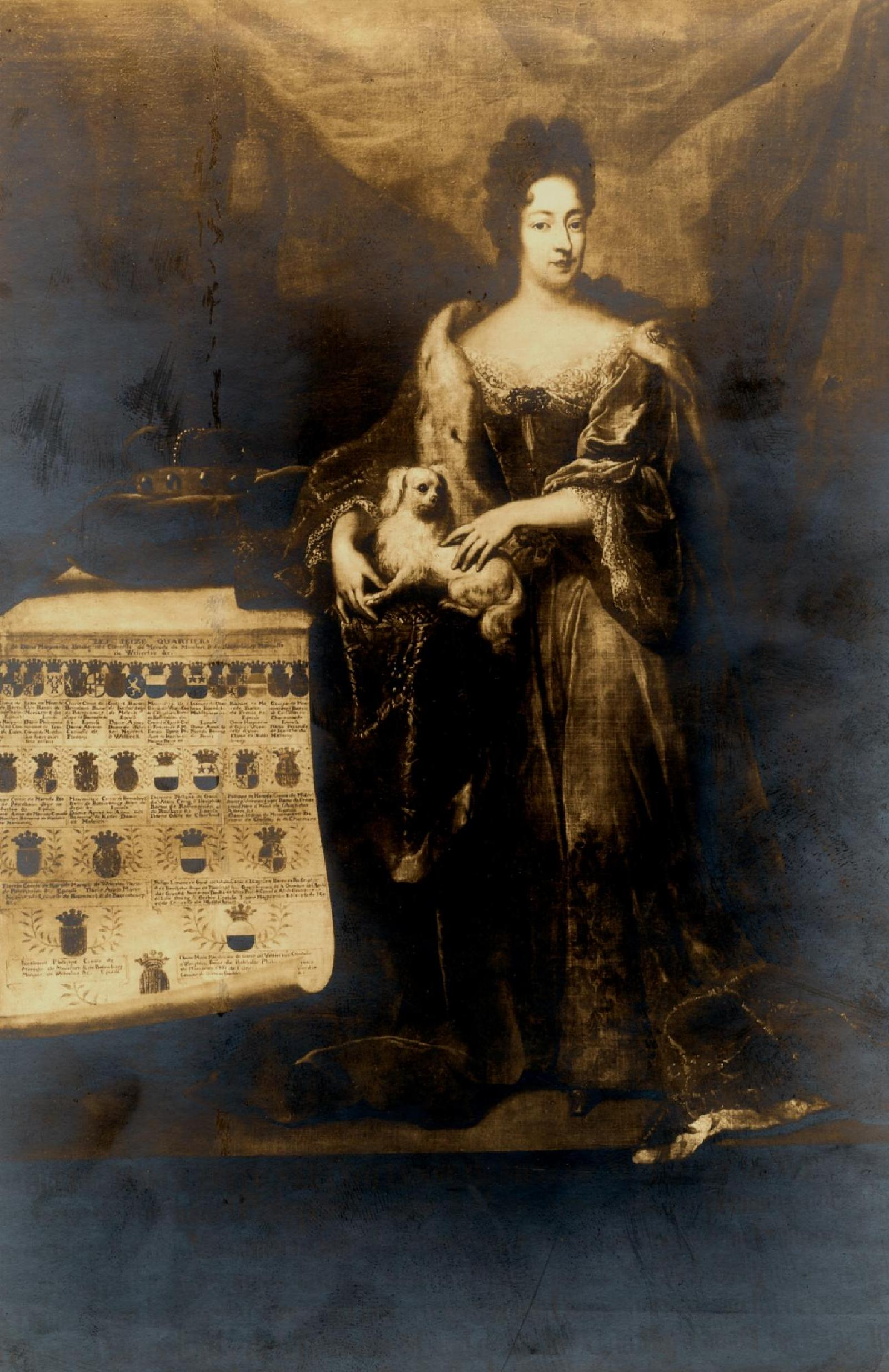
Jean Philippe's mother: Isabella of Schleswig-Holstein-Sonderburg-Plön-Rethwisch

Jean-Philippe-Eugène, Count de Mérode, 5th Marquess of Westerloo (22 June 1674 in Brussels – 12 September 1732 in Merode castle) was a soldier and Feldmarschall of the Holy Roman Empire and a prominent member of the House of Merode. In Flemish and Dutch sources, he is known as Jan Filip van Merode-Westerloo.

== Biography ==
Jean-Philippe-Eugène de Mérode was the only surviving child of Maximilian de Mérode-Pietersheim (1627-1675) and his wife and cousin, Isabella-Margaretha de Mérode-Westerloo (1649–1701). His father died one year after his birth and his mother remarried with the Joachim Ernest II, Duke of Schleswig-Holstein-Rethwisch. He was an army commander who guided Jean-Philippe towards a military career. At the age of five Jean-Philippe was already present at the siege of Oran in North Africa.

During the consecutive wars which raged in the Spanish Netherlands, Jean-Philippe switched sides a few times to maintain his possessions. First, he and his Regiment of Westerloo served the anti-French coalition under King William III of England and King Charles II of Spain. In 1694 he was made Knight in the Order of the Golden Fleece.

During the War of Spanish Succession he served the new Bourbon King Philip V of Spain and fought on the side of the French and Bavarians under Maximilian II Emanuel, Elector of Bavaria, new governor of the Southern Netherlands. He played an important role in the Battle of Eckeren in 1703.

The next year he fought in the Battle of Blenheim on the side of the French under Tallard and Marsin. The battle was a great defeat and Mérode narrowly escaped death.

After the battle, Mérode retired to his castles in Westerlo, Pietersheim and Merode. From then on, he served the new rulers of the Southern Netherlands: the Austrian Emperors Joseph I and Charles VI. In 1717 he was rewarded with the title of Field Marshal.

Mérode had a difficult character and had personal conflicts with Prince Eugene of Savoy and the Marquis de Prié.

== Marriage and children ==
He married first in 1701 in Bayonne in 1701 with Maria-Theresia de Aragon y Pignatelli (1682-1718), the daughter of Nicolas Pignatelli, Duke de Monteleone and Viceroy of Sardinia. They had three children of whom only Isabella-Marie (1703-1780) survived infancy, marrying both times a Count Czernin von und zu Chudenitz.

Maria-Theresia died of Smallpox on 9 August 1718.

Mérode married again on 29 September 1721 with Princess Charlotte Wilhelmine Amalie Alexandrina of Nassau-Hadamar (1703–1740), daughter of Francis Alexander, Prince of Nassau-Hadamar.

Children :

- Jean-Guillaume-Augustin (16 June 1722 - 7 January 1763), married Princess Eléonore de Rohan (1728-1792), daughter of Charles de Rohan, Prince of Rochefort (1728-1792),
- Johanna-Christina (7 May 1724 - ?), a nun in Maubeuge.
- Marie-Elisabeth-Félicité (2 July 1728 - ?), a nun in Thorn Abbey.
- Philippe-Maximilien (4 July 1729 - 25 January 1773), married Marie Catherine de Merode-Montfort (1743-1794), had offspring.
  - His grandson was Werner de Merode-Westerloo (1797-1840), whose daughters were
    - Antoinette (1828–1864), who married Charles III, Prince of Monaco
    - Louise, mother of Maria Vittoria del Pozzo della Cisterna, Queen consort of Spain (1870-1873)
- Maria-Theresia (8 June 1730 - ?)
- Maria-Josepha (21 February 1730 - ?)

== Memoirs ==
Jean-Philippe-Eugène de Merode-Westerloo is best remembered for his memoirs, which were published by his great-grandson Henri de Merode, and which are a valuable source of information on the Battle of Blenheim, as seen from the side of the defeated.

- Jean-Philippe-Eugène de Merode-Westerloo: Mémoires du Feld-Maréchal Comte de Mérode-Westerloo, Chevalier de la Toison d'Or, Capitaine de Trabans de l'Empereur Charles VI. - 2 volumes, Brussels, 1840.

== Literature ==
- Parker, Robert; Mérode-Westerloo, Count (1998). Chandler, David (ed.). Military Memoirs of Marlborough's campaigns 1702-1712. Translated by Chandler, David. London: Greenhill Books. ISBN 1-85367-330-7. OCLC 652038985.
