= Xavier de Mérode =

Roman Catholic bishop

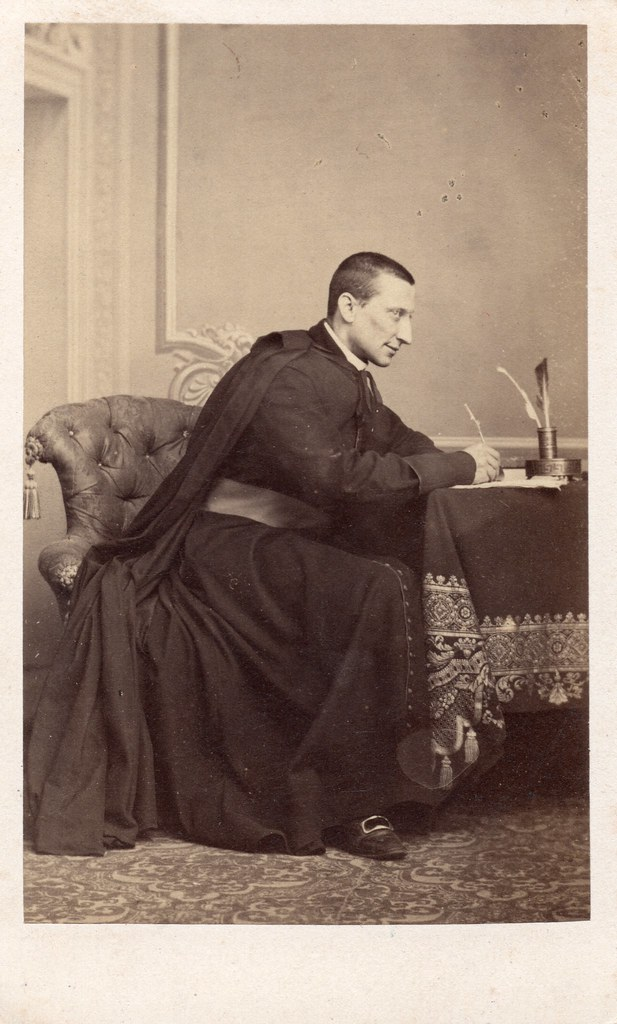
Xavier de Mérode

Xavier de Mérode (Frédéric François Xavier Ghislain; March 22,1820 – July 11, 1874) was a Belgian Catholic prelate, archbishop and statesman of the Papal States.

A protege of Pope Pius IX, de Mérode became known for his humane reform of prisons in the Papal States, for his public works projects in Rome and for the establishment of the Papal Zouaves to defend the pope.

== Biography ==
=== Early life and education ===
Xavier De Mérode was born on March 16, 1820, in Brussels, then part of the United Kingdom of the Netherlands. His father was Count Félix de Mérode-Westerloo, who later held in turn the portfolios of foreign affairs, war, and finances under King Leopold I in the new Kingdom of Belgium. His mother was Rosalie de Grammont.

Xavier De Mérode was connected through the House of Mérode in Belgium to the French aristocracy. He was the brother-in-law of the French historian Charles Forbes René de Montalembert, and the grand-nephew of the Marquis de Lafayette, the French hero of the American Revolution.

When Xavier de Mérode was age three, Rosalie de Grammont died; he was raised at Villersexel, in Franche-Comté, France, by his aunt, Philippine de Grammont. De Mérode first attended the Collège Notre-Dame de la Paix, a Jesuit Catholic school in Namur. He continued his education in France at the Collège de Juilly, an Oratorians Catholic school in Juilly, Seine-et-Marne.

=== Soldier ===
In 1839, de Mérode returned to Belgium to enter the Military Academy of Brussels. He graduated with the rank of second lieutenant in the Belgian Army. He then served a short assignment at the armoury in Liège, Belgium. In 1844, de Mérode joined the staff of Maréchal Thomas Robert Bugeaud, governor-general of the French Colony of Algeria. Sent by the Belgian Government to Algeria as a foreign attaché, de Mérode fought with the French forces in their campaign against the Kabyle people. For his service, he was awarded the cross of the Légion d'honneur.

=== Priest ===
In 1847, de Mérode decided to become a priest. He immediately resigned his army commission and travelled to Rome to study for the priesthood at the Pontifical Gregorian University in what was then the Papal States. In November 1848, a democratic revolution overturned the papal government, forcing Pope Pius IX was forced to flee to Gaeta, Italy. Pius IX then published a papal bull excommunicating all the rebel leaders. Despite the risks, de Mérode traveled throughout Rome, posting copies of the bull on the church doors. By July 1849, a French army had overthrown the Roman Republic, restoring papal control. De Mérode was ordained a priest in Rome on September 22, 1849. After his ordination, he was assigned as a chaplain to the French garrison quartered in Viterbo, Italy.

=== Director of prisons ===
In 1850, Pius IX returned to Rome. In recognition of de Mérode's service during the rebellion the pope named him as a cameriere segreto (secret waiter), a member of the papal household. Interested in making the prisons more humane, de Mérode introduced religious brothers from Brothers of Mercy of Our Lady of Perpetual Help from Mechelen, Belgium to provide spiritual instruction to the inmates and care for their sick. The French envoy at Rome, Alphonse de Rayneval, praised de Mérode's prison reforms in an official report to his government. Archbishop Gioacchino Pecci wanted de Mérode to undertake similar reforms in the Archdiocese of Perugia.

=== Minister of War ===
By 1860, de Mérode was alarmed by the rise of Italian nationalism and its threat to the Papal States. He convinced Pius IX to form a military corps of Catholic volunteers from Italy and other nations. His initiative was opposed by the Roman Prelature, headed by the Vatican Secretary of State, Cardinal Giacomo Antonelli. The pope appointed de Mérode as minister of war. The nucleus of this new corps was the Franco-Belgian Tirailleurs, a volunteer unit that had been organized by the French General Christophe Léon Louis Juchault de Lamoricière. De Mérode appointed him as commander of the new unit, which was later named the Papal Zouaves. The Zouaves served the pope until their disbandment in 1870.

=== Public works director ===
After establishing the Papal Zouaves, de Mérode devoted himself to public works in Rome. He paid for the construction of the Campo pretoriano outside the Porta Pia Gate of the Aurelian Walls, the fortifications of ancient Rome. His other projects in Rome included the clearing of the approaches to the Basilica of Santa Maria degli Angeli, the opening of streets in the new section of Rome and sanitation upgrades in the old quarters by the Tiber River.

De Mérode's temperament and progressive views gained him enemies among the more traditional quarters of Roman society. He gained more opponents among the French forces in Rome after he accused French Emperor Napoleon III of duplicity in dealing with the enemies of the Papal States. After Lamoricière died on September 19, 1865, de Mérode's enemies were able to attack him. Pius IX was forced to remove him from his papal offices after Napoleon III threatened to withdraw the French Army from Rome.

=== Papal almoner ===
On June 22, 1866, Pius appointed de Mérode as archbishop of the titular see of Melitene. His new position was that of papal almoner, responsible for distributing papal alms to the poor and performing confirmation sacraments on dying children. As almoner, he also created free medical consultations and a pharmacy.

In 1869, de Mérode attended the First Vatican Council in Rome. The major issue at that council was the acceptance of the doctrine of papal infallibility. Like many others opposed to its adoption, de Mérode believed that the time was inopportune. and even dangerous. However, when the council finally defined papal infallibility as dogma, he submitted to it.

After a short conflict, the forces of the Kingdom of Italy took control of Rome on September 20, 1870, ending the Papal States. Pius IX was left with control of Vatican City. During his last four years, de Mérode opposed the Kingdom of Italy's pretensions on the Campo pretoriano. He supported the work of archeologist Giovanni Battista de Rossi for the discovery of the ruins of the Church of Santa Petronilla in the Tor Marancino district in Rome. Pius IX announced that he would be elevating de Mérode to the rank of cardinal in a consistory in late 1874.

=== Death ===
In June 1874, de Mérode met with a group of American clerics in Rome. He expressed his happiness at the growth of Catholicism in that nation and his appreciation of the role played there by his grand uncle, the Marquis of Lafayette.

Before the consistory occurred, de Mérode died on July 11, 1874, of acute pneumonia at age 54. He was interred in the Teutonic Cemetery in Vatican City.

== See also ==
- House of Merode
