= Félix de Mérode =

Belgian politician

Félix de Merode
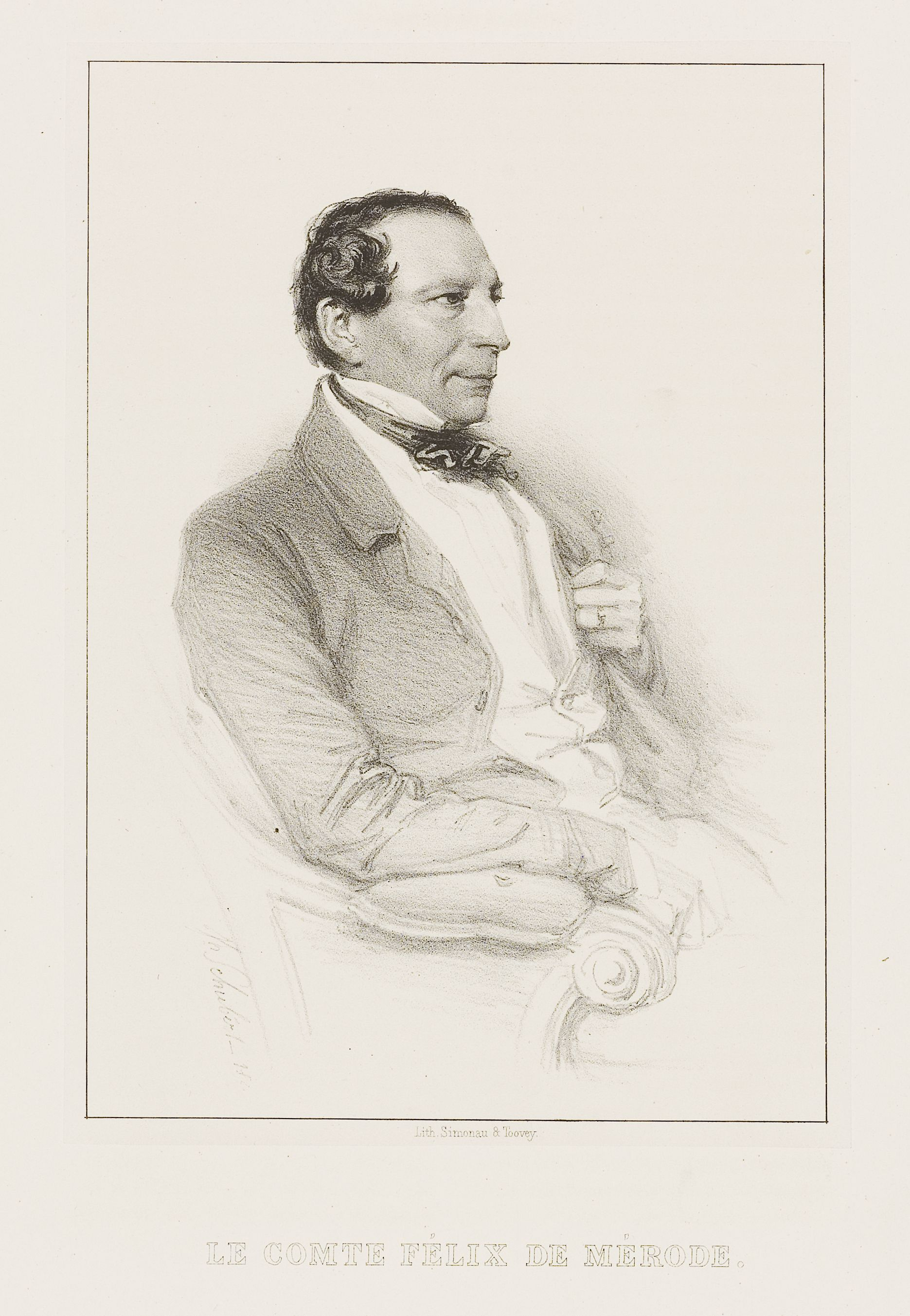
- Born: Philippe Félix Balthasar Otto Ghislain, Count de Merode; 13 April 1791; Maastricht, Dutch Republic
- Died: 7 February 1857 (aged 65)
- Occupation: politician

Philippe Félix Balthasar Otto Ghislain, Count de Merode (13 April 1791 – 7 February 1857), known as Félix de Merode, was a Belgian politician. He has been called "the architect of Belgian independence'.

== Biography ==
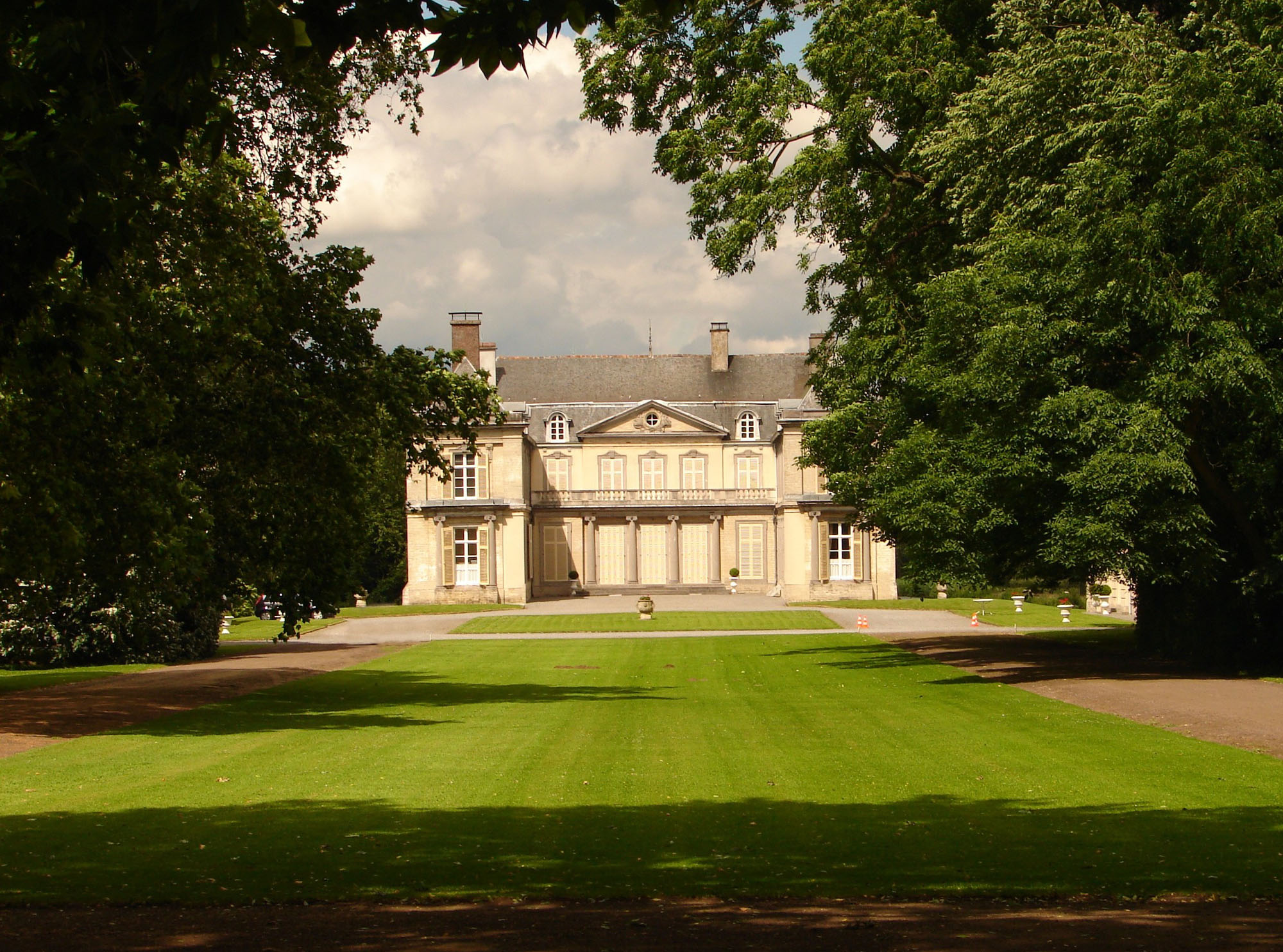
Mérode Castle, Everberg

Born in Maastricht, he was the second son of Charles-Guillaume-Ghislain de Merode, a mayor of Brussels during the period in which modern Belgium formed part of France. Under the First French Empire, Merode lived in Paris. In 1809 he married Rosalie de Gramont, niece by marriage of the Marquis de Lafayette. From then until 1830 he habitually resided in France, with the Grammont family, making short stays with his father in Brussels or at the castle of Everberg, near Louvain.

In 1823, he lost his wife and lived in an even deeper retirement, but without ever losing interest in the great social problems which then agitated France. Imbued with both Christian and liberal ideas, as a convinced follower of the religious traditions of the past, he supported constitutional freedoms. In 1829, he published in the Catholique, a work entitled: "A word on the political conduct of Belgian Catholics, of French Catholics." It was an eloquent defense of the doctrines then held by Lamennais.

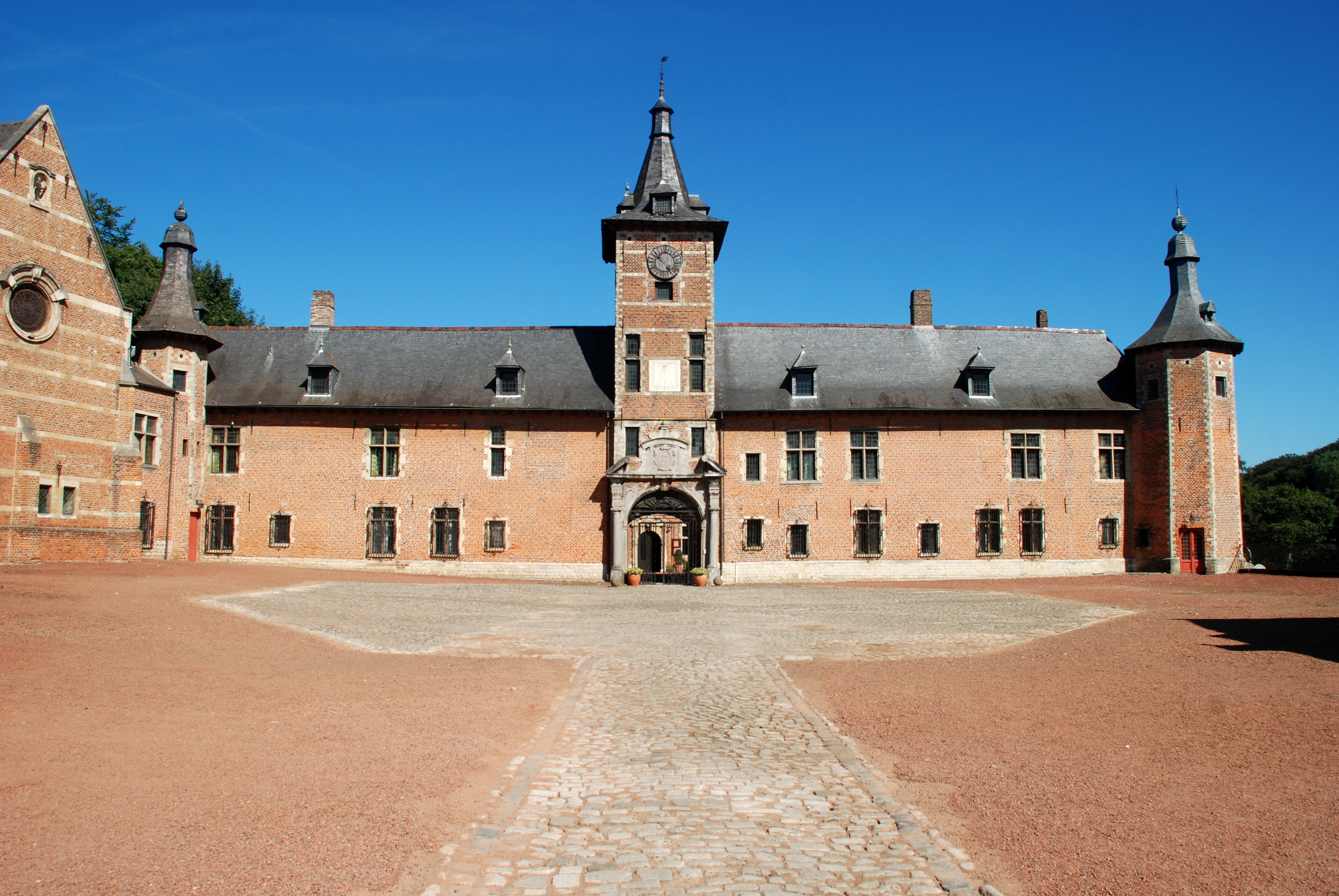
Château de Rixensart

Félix inherited the Château de Rixensart from his father. He settled in the southern part of the United Kingdom of the Netherlands—modern Belgium—and was one of the leaders of the Belgian Revolution of 1830. On 8 September he was appointed member of the Commission of public safety, and advanced a considerable sum to come to the assistance of the workmen left without work in consequence of the disturbances, hoping thus to contribute to the restoration of order.

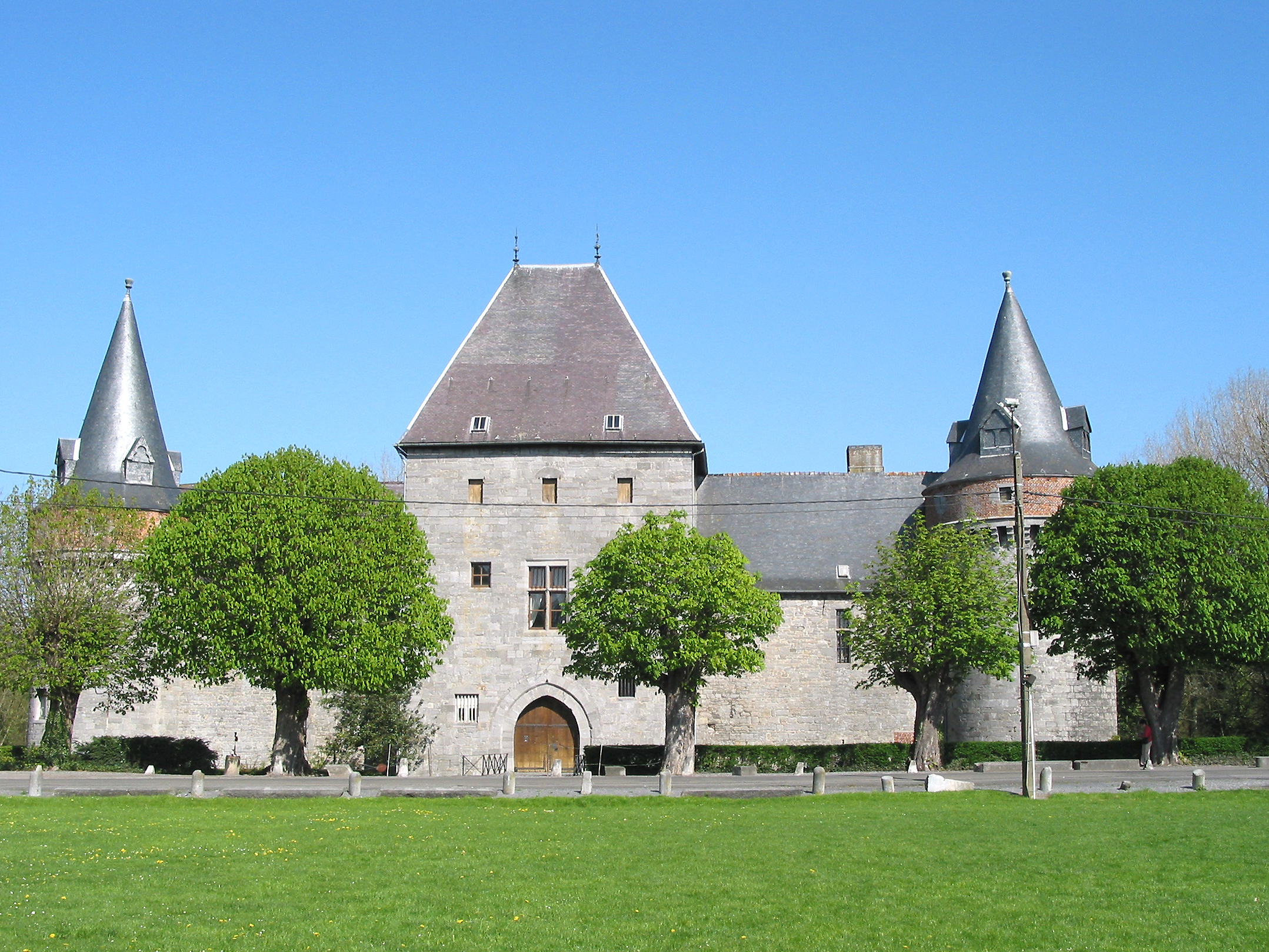
Solre-sur-Sambre

But after the day of the 20th, during which the people disarmed the Bourgeois Guard and expelled the Commission of public security at the town hall, discouragement seized the Count, like many other defenders of the national cause. He left the city and, on the 22nd, went to join his mother at the castle of Rixensart from where he went to Solre -sur-Sambre.

Returning to Brussels on 26 September, he was head of the Provisional Government of Belgium and served in the Belgian National Congress which was elected in November 1830. He was a co-author and signatory of the Belgian Constitution. The participation of members of such a prominent family as the Merodes did much to lend credibility to the revolution as a bona fide movement and not just a display of civil disorder.

He refused to encroach on the prerogatives of Congress and supported a representative constitutional monarchy. Merode was proposed as a candidate for the throne of the newly created Belgium, but refused to be considered as he was not a prince, merely a count. Merode's younger brother, Frédéric de Merode, was wounded during the fighting against the forces of King William I in Berchem on 23 October 1830 and died on 5 November.

He formed part of the delegation to Paris which sought to have Louis, Duke of Nemours, second son of King Louis Philippe I, accept the throne, but this approach was rebuffed by the French king. Merode was a confidant of the eventual king, Leopold I, and was made a Minister of State in 1831.

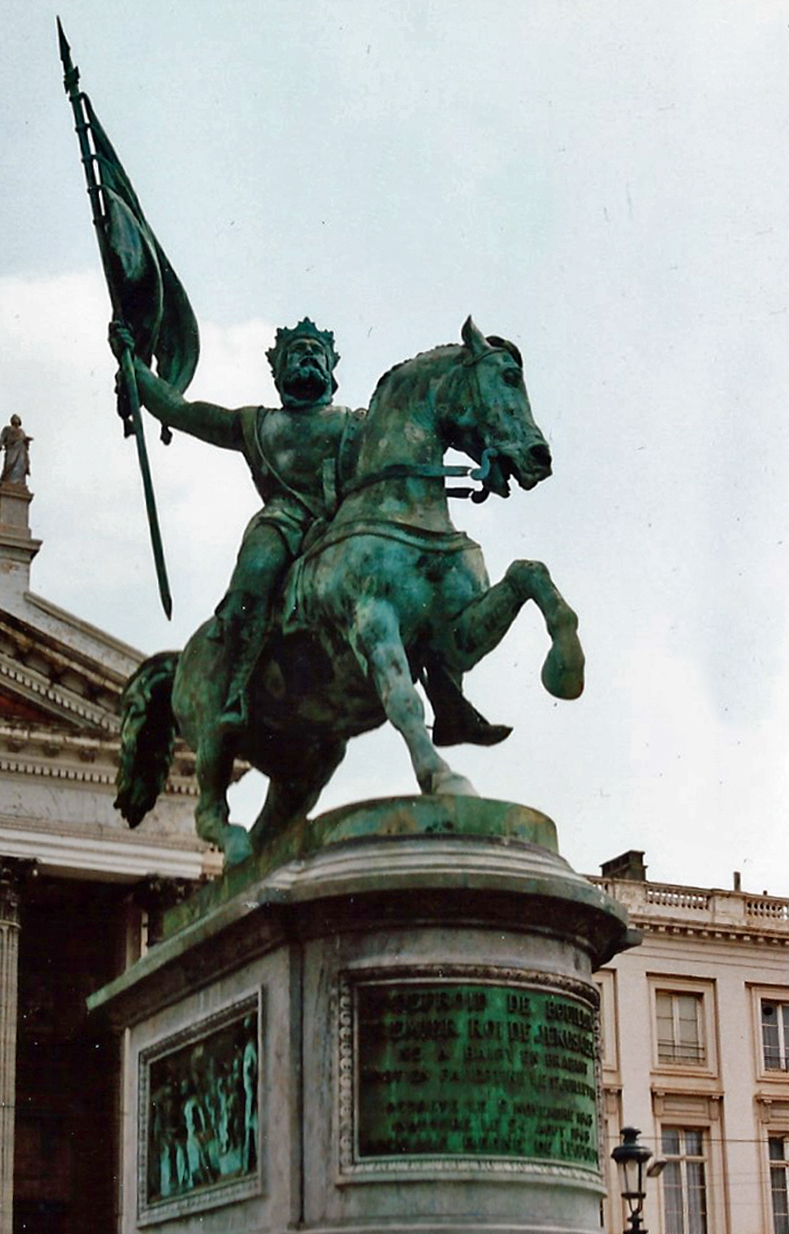
Godfrey de Bouillon, Place Royale

He served as Foreign affairs, War, and Finance minister in the 1830s. He resigned from office in 1839 as he was unwilling to sign the Treaty of London ceding Belgian territory to the Kingdom of the Netherlands. On 9 August 1832 he was at the Château de Compiègne as one of the witnesses to the marriage of Léopold I with Princess Louise of Orléans. Merode represented the arrondissement of Nivelles for twenty-four years.

In 1848, he contributed in large part to the expenses of the erection of the statue of Godfrey of Bouillon by Eugène Simonis for the Place Royale, Brussels.

== Issue ==
- His son, Xavier de Mérode became a member of the Papal Court and was involved in many public works.
- His daughter, Marie Théodoline de Merode, born in Villersexel on 22 July 1817 and died in Paris on 26 February 1909, married Alof, marquis de Wignacourt (died in Paris in January 1897) on 9 August 1843. On the death of her father, Félix de Merode (7 February 1857), Marie Théodoline inherited Solre-sur-Sambre Castle.
- His daughter, Anne married Charles Forbes René de Montalembert; Montalembert's political ideas were supported by Merode.

Count Félix de Merode died in Brussels on 7 February 1857 and was buried five days later at Rixensart, the burial place of the Counts of Merode.

== Honours ==
- Belgium: Iron Cross.
- Belgium: Minister of State, By Royal Decree.
- Belgium: Grand Cordon in the Order of Leopold (posthumously, by decree of 2 July 1857.
- Knight Grand Cross in the Order of Saint Gregory the Great.
- Portugal: Knight Grand Cross in the Order of Christ.
- France: Officier in the Legion of Honour.
- On the occasion of his death in 1857, the government issued a commemorative copper medal.

== See also ==
- House of Merode
- List of defence ministers of Belgium
