= Lannoy =

The name Lannoy or de Lannoy or of Lannoy can refer to

Places

- Lannoy, Nord, a commune of the Nord department, France
- Lannoy-Cuillère, a village and commune in the Oise département, France
- Lannoy Abbey, a Cistercian abbey in present-day Oise, France

People

- House of Lannoy: A noble Belgian family.
  - Hugues de Lannoy (1384–1456), Flemish traveler and diplomat
  - Guillebert de Lannoy (1386–1462), Flemish traveler and diplomat
  - Baudouin de Lannoy (1388–1474), Flemish diplomat
  - Jean de Lannoy (1410–1493), Flemish diplomat
  - Claude de Lannoy, 1st Count of la Motterie
  - Stéphanie, Hereditary Grand Duchess of Luxembourg (Stephanie de Lannoy, born 1984)
  - Charles de Lannoy, 1st Prince of Sulmona (1487–1527), soldier and statesman in service of the Habsburg Emperors Maximilian I and Charles V of Spain
  - Philip de Lannoy, 2nd Prince of Sulmona (fl. 1544), Italian military leader in Spanish service
  - Valentin de Lannoy; governor of Hulst.
- Colinet de Lannoy (died before 1497), French or Franco-Flemish composer of the Renaissance
- Eustachius De Lannoy (1715–1777), Flemish naval commander of the Dutch East India Company, defeated by the king Marthanda Varma
- Louis De Lannoy (1902–1968), Belgian professional road bicycle racer
- Micheline Lannoy (1925–2023), Belgian figure skater
- Stéphane Lannoy (born 1969), French football referee
- Tippy de Lanoy Meijer (born 1943), Dutch field hockey player

== See also ==
- Delannoy
