= Eugène-Hyacinthe de Lannoy, 5th Count of la Motterie =

Eugéne-Hyacinthe-Marie-Joseph-Ignace de Lannoy, 5th Count of la Motterie, baron of Aix and Sombreffe (1684 in Brussels – 10 September 1755) was a functionary in the Austrian Netherlands.

== Family ==
He was the son of François-Hyacinthe de Lannoy, 4th Count of la Motterie and Baron of Sombreffe, and Anne-Françoise of Gavre. Claude de Lannoy, 1st Count of la Motterie was his great-grandfather. He was the brother in law of Dominik von Königsegg-Rothenfels, imperial ambassador. He married Lambertine du Faign, Countess of Hasselt, lady of the Starry Cross. He was succeeded by his son Chrétien de Lannoy, 6th Count of La Motterie.

== Functions ==
- Governor of Dendermonde.
- Governor of Brussels in 1737.
- Imperial lord chamberlain
- 1751–1756: Grand Marshal of the Imperial Court of Brussels.
- Member of the Council of State.
- Field-Marshal, general of the Artillery of the Imperial army
- Member of the States of Brabant, as Baron of Sombreffe.

== Honours ==
- Knight of the Golden Fleece in 1744.

Belgian nobility
Preceded by François-Hyacinthe de Lannoy	5th Count of La Motterie	Succeeded by Chrétien de Lannoy
