= House of Lannoy =

Belgian noble family

- Country: Belgium
- Founded: 13th century
- Founder: Gillion de l'Annoit
- Titles: Lords of Leeuwerghem; Lords of Molembais; Lords of Maingoval; Barons of Aix; Barons of Clairvaux; Barons of Sombreffe; Counts of Lannoy; Counts of Beaurepaire; Counts of La Motterie; Princes of Sulmona; Prince of Rheina-Wolbeck; Grand Duchess of Luxembourg
- Estates: Bornem Castle; Anvaing Castle
- Cadet branches: Lannoy-Clairvaux; Lannoy-Beaurepaire; Lannoy-Mangoval

Coat of arms

The House of Lannoy is an ancient and important Belgian noble family that takes its name from the town of Lannoy in northern France. In their capacity as Princes of Rheina-Wolbeck, members of the House of Lannoy held a hereditary seat in the Prussian House of Lords (Preußisches Herrenhaus), through which they were formally incorporated into the German high nobility. The name of the family comes from l'Annoy (or l'Annoit, from Latin alnetum), which means 'the alderwood' in Picard French of Flanders.

== History ==
The oldest known ancestor is Gillion de l'Annoit, who lived in the 13th century. Many of his descendants were members of the Order of the Golden Fleece. They played a prominent role in Flanders during the Middle Ages. Different family branches and lines existed amongst the Lords of Beaurepaire, Clervaux, Princes of Sulmona and Princes of Rheina-Wolbeck.

One branch of the family supposedly became the influential American Delano family through its progenitor, Philip Delano. However, the possible connection between the two has never been proven. A branch of the family supposedly engaged in the transatlantic slave trade, resulting in an existing lineage of the family in South America and the Caribbean.

== Notable members ==
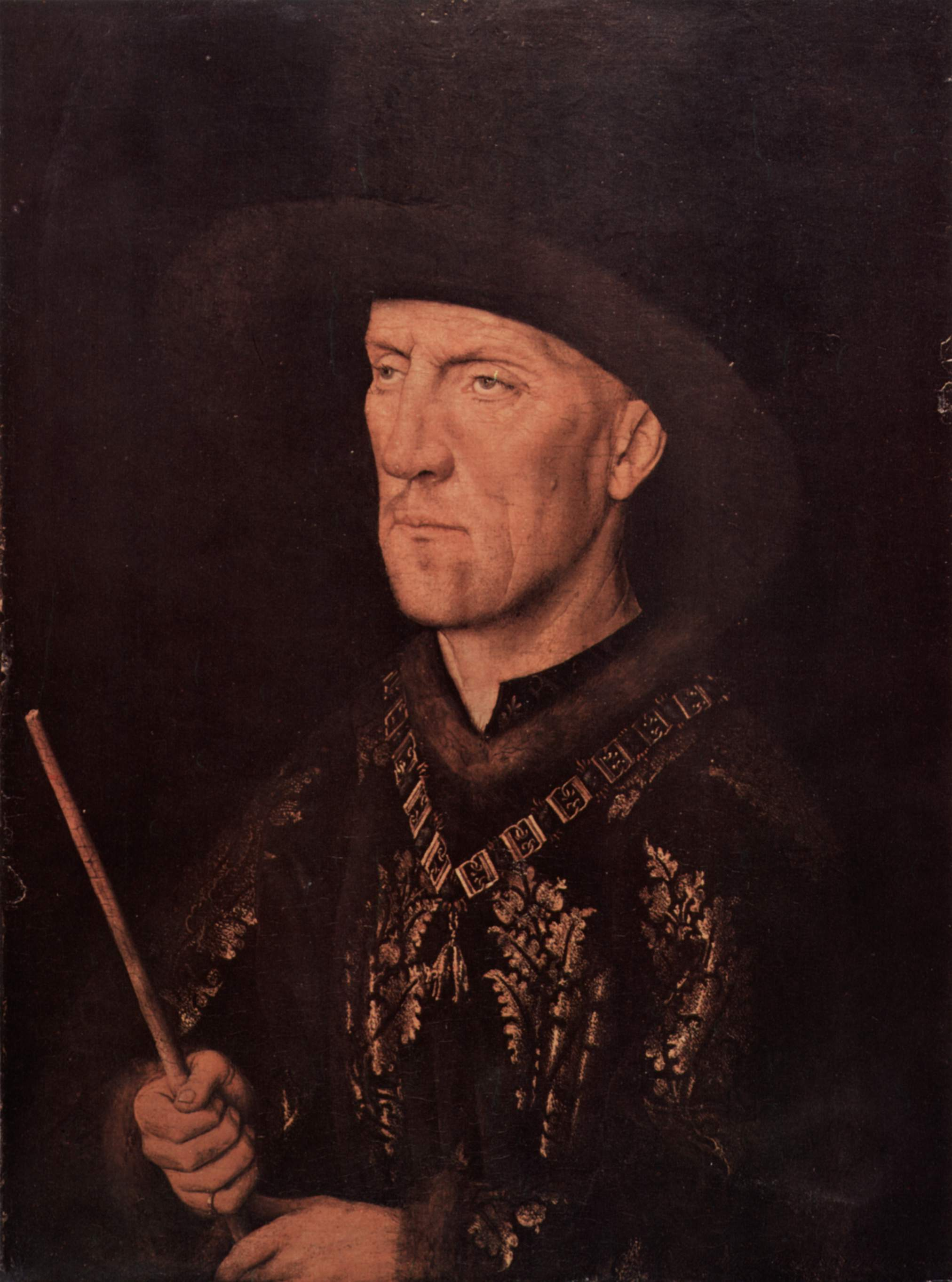
Baudouin, Lord of Molembaix

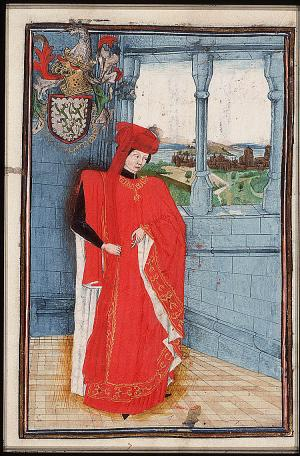
Hugues, Lord of Santes

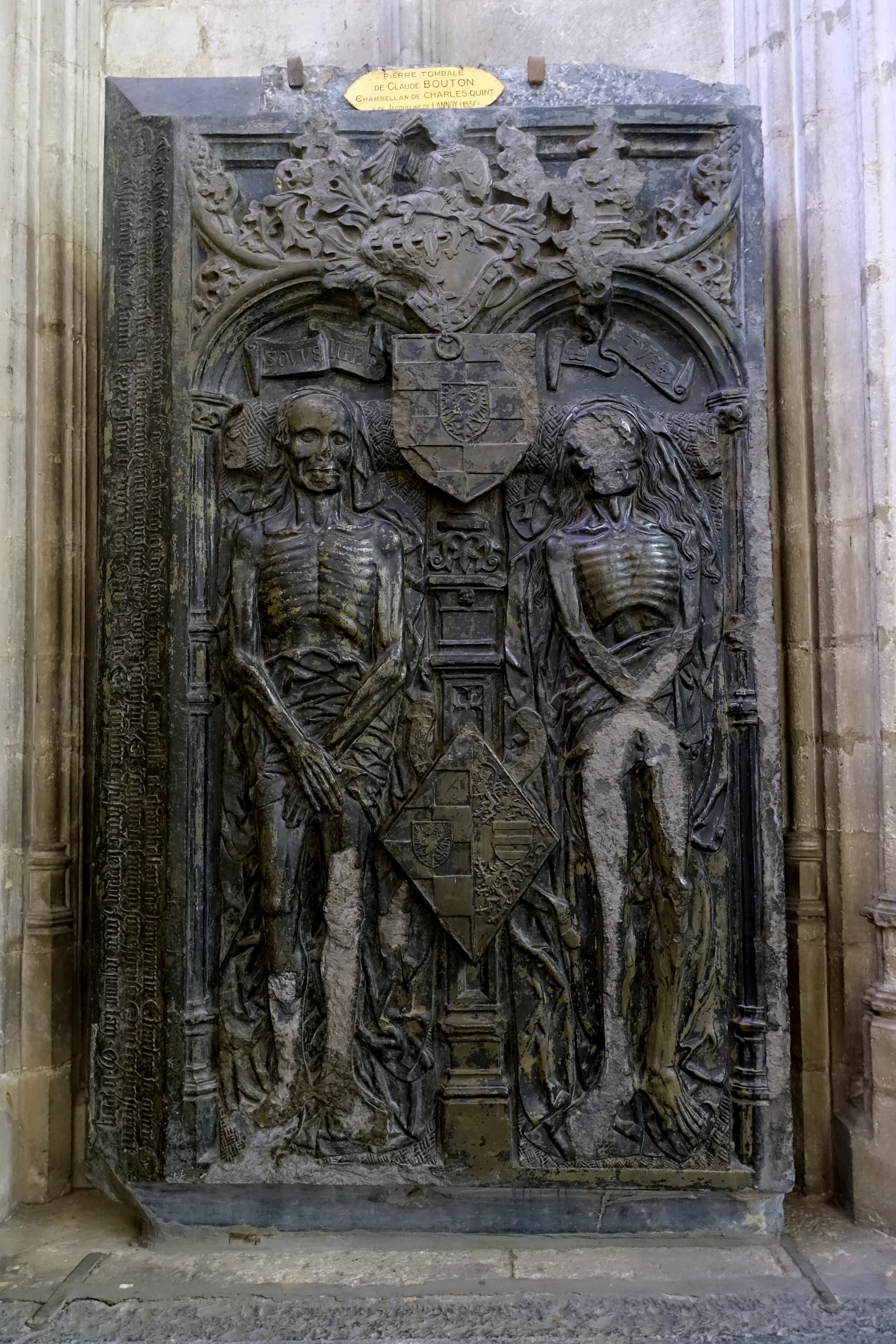
Grave of Jacqueline de Lannoy and her husband Claude Bouton

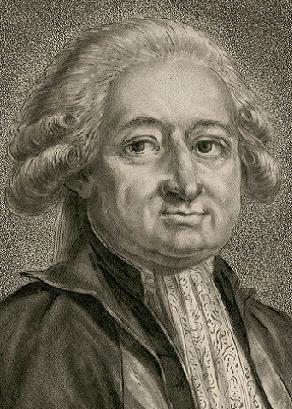
Charles François de Lannoy

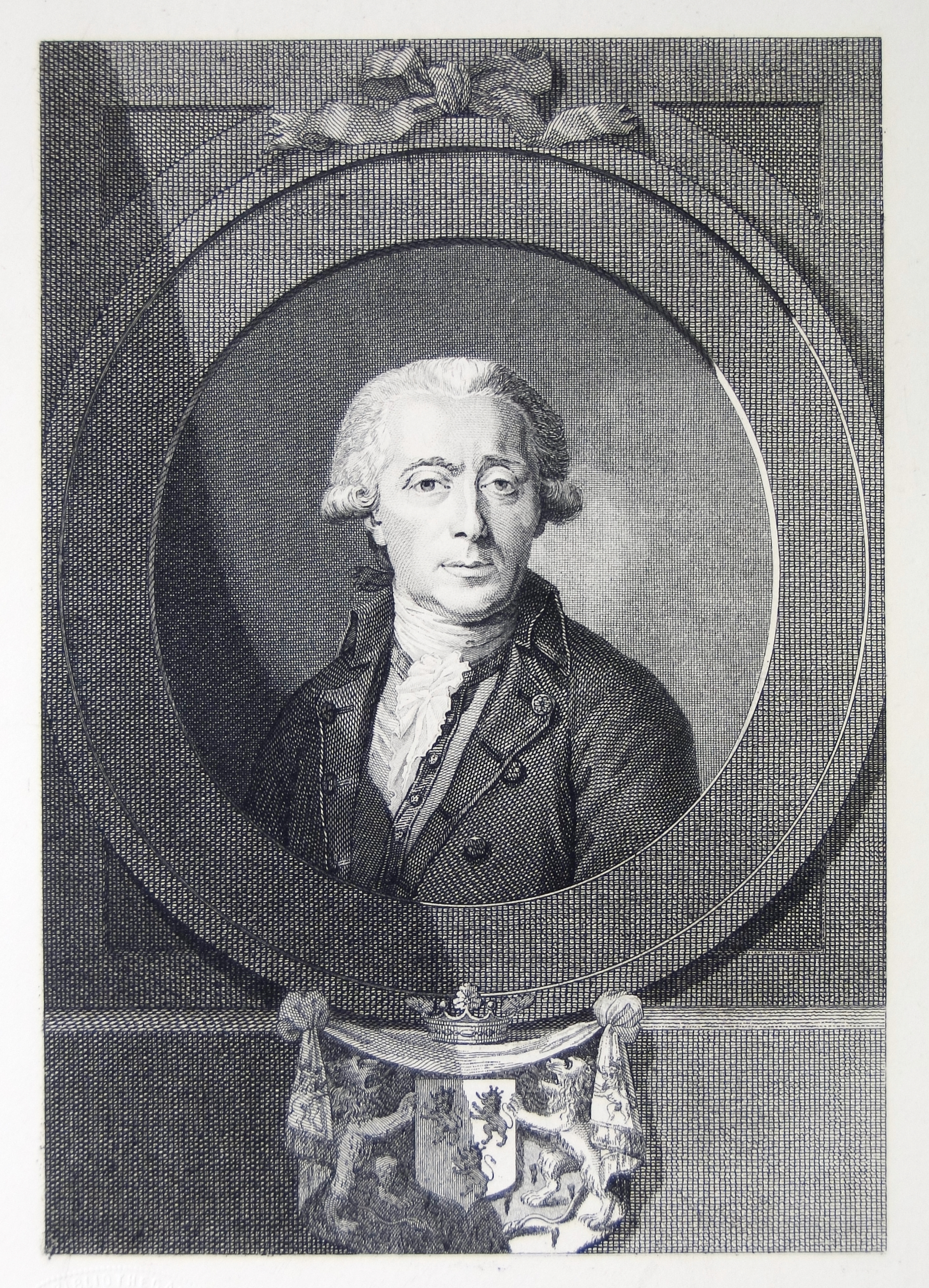
Chrétien de Lannoy, 5th Count of la Motterie, Imperial Lord Chamberlain

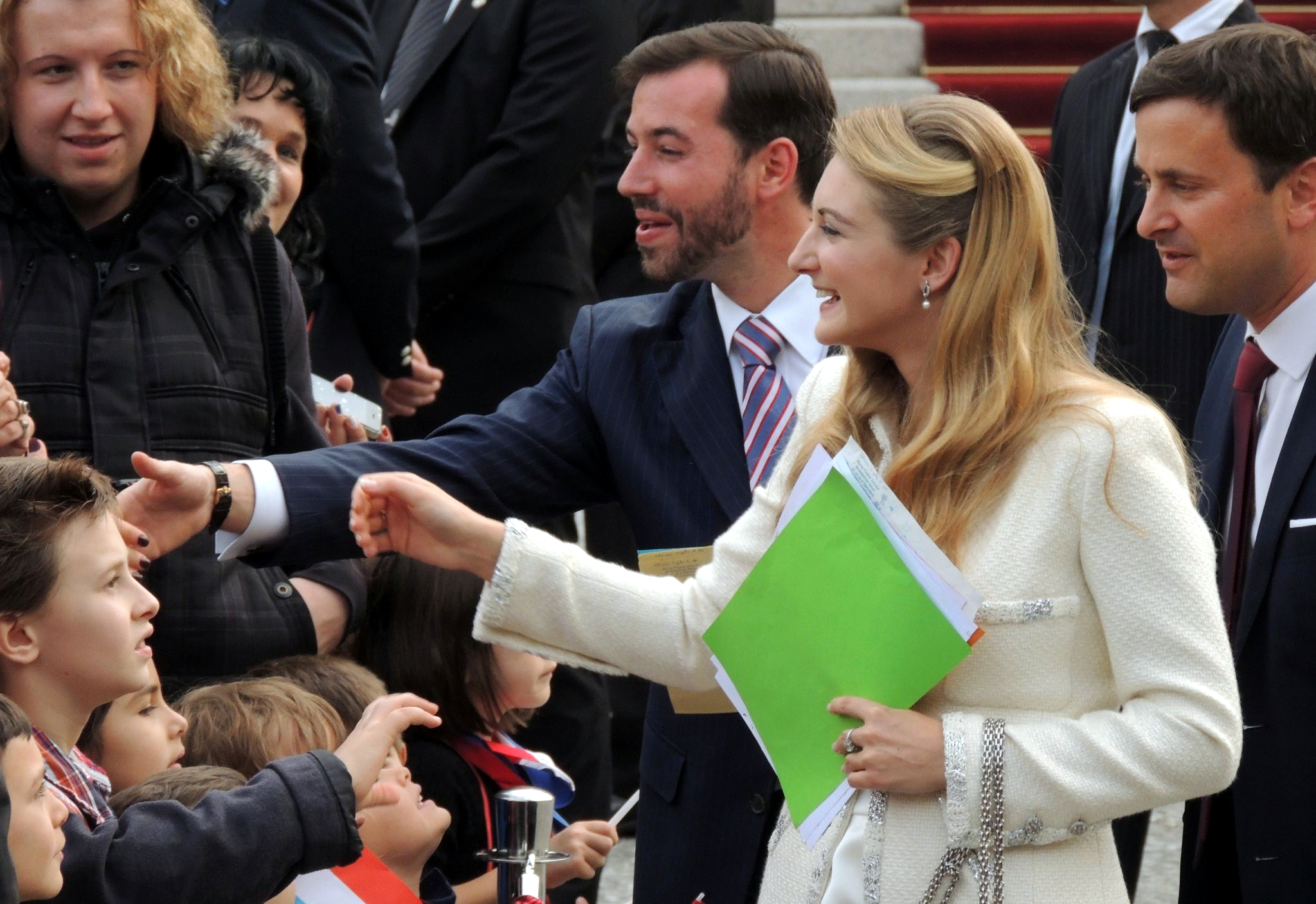
Stephanie, Grand Duchess of Luxembourg

=== Lords of Molembaix ===
Molembaix was a place in the region of Oostkapelle, where the .

Guillebert I de Lannoy, Lord of Santes;
Married to Catherine de Saint-Aubin, Lady of Molembais:

  1. Guillebert II de Lannoy (1386–1462), Flemish traveler and diplomat
  2. Hugo van Lannoy (1384–1456), Flemish traveler and diplomat
  3. Baudouin de Lannoy, said "Le Begue", Lord of Molembais (1388–1474), Flemish diplomat
    1. Baudouin II de Lannoy, Lord of Molembais, Knight Of the Golden Fleece;
      Married to Marie d'Esne, Lady of Conroy.
      1. Philippe I de Lannoy, Lord of Molembais, Grand Huntsman of Brabant
        Married to Madeleine of Bourgundy.
        1. Jean de Lannoy, Lord of Molembais: Knight of the Golden Fleece;
          Married to Joanne de Ligne.
          1. Marie de Lannoy;
            Married to John IV of Glymes (1528–1567): Marquess of Berges
        2. Baudouin III de Lannoy, Lord of Turcoing; Lord of the Golden Fleece.
        3. Philippe II, Lord of Beauvoir;
          Married to Jeanne of Blois.
      2. Françoise de Lannoy; Married to Antoine of Montmorency
      3. Madeleine de Lannoy; Married to Jean de Roisin.
      4. Jacqueline de Lannoy;
        Married to Claude Bouton, Lord of Corbaron.
  4. Jean I de Lannoy, Lord of La Motterie;
    Married to Marie de Cordes
    1. Jean II de Lannoy, Lord of La Motterie

=== Lords of Leeuwergem and La Motterie ===
Leeuwergem is a small village in Flanders, it has an 18th century castle. The first small castle in Leeuwergem was built by Valentin de Lannoy in the 17th century. The branch of the Lords of Leeuwergem became extinct after 3 generations. The branch of the Counts of la Motterie was known to have multiple men in military service of the Crown.

Jacques de Lannoy, Lord of la Motterie, died 1587:
Married to Susanne of Noyelles.

  1. Adrien de Lannoy, Lord of Wasmes: founder of the branch of Lannoy de Wasmes.
  2. Claude de Lannoy, 1st Count of la Motterie, Knight of the Golden Fleece;
    Married to Claudine d'Eltz, Lady of Clairvaux.
    1. Philippe de Lannoy, 2nd Count of la Motterie;
      Married to Louise-Michele d'Ognyes.
      1. Ignace-Philippe de Lannoy, 3rd Count of Beaurepiare; see further.
      2. François-Hyacinthe de Lannoy, 4th Count of la Motterie;
        Married to Anne-Françoise of Gavre.
        1. Marie-Thérèse de Lannoy, Lady of the Starry Cross;
          Married to Josef-Dominik, Count of Konigsegg-Rothenfels.
        2. Eugène-Hyacinthe de Lannoy, 5th Count of la Motterie; Lord Grand Marshall in Imperial Service; Knight of the Golden Fleece and Councillor of State.
          1. Chrétien de Lannoy, 6th Count of la Motterie; Imperial Lord Chamberlain. He died without male heirs and was the last Count of La Motterie.
    2. Albert-Eugene de Lannoy, 1st Baron of Clairvaux; founder of the Branch of de Lannoy-Clairvaux.
  3. Valentin de Lannoy, died 1640: Governor of Hulst.
    Married in 1622 to Isabelle de La Loo, Lady of Leeuwergem
    1. Eugene de Lannoy, Lord of Leeuwergem.
    2. Charles de Lannoy, Lord of Leeuwergem.
    3. Albert de Lannoy, Lord of Leeuwergem, died 1688:
      Married to Adrienne-Marie vanden Eeckhoutte.
      1. Adrienne-Florence de Lannoy:
        Married to Charles de Boisschot, 3nd Baron of Saventhem.
    4. Hélène de Lannoy, Noble Canonnese in Nivelles.
    5. Anne-Marguerite de Lannoy:
      Married to François de Boisschot, 2nd Baron of Saventhem, son of Ferdinand de Boisschot
    6. Jean-Louis de Lannoy, Lord of Leeuwergem.

=== Counts of Beaurepaire ===
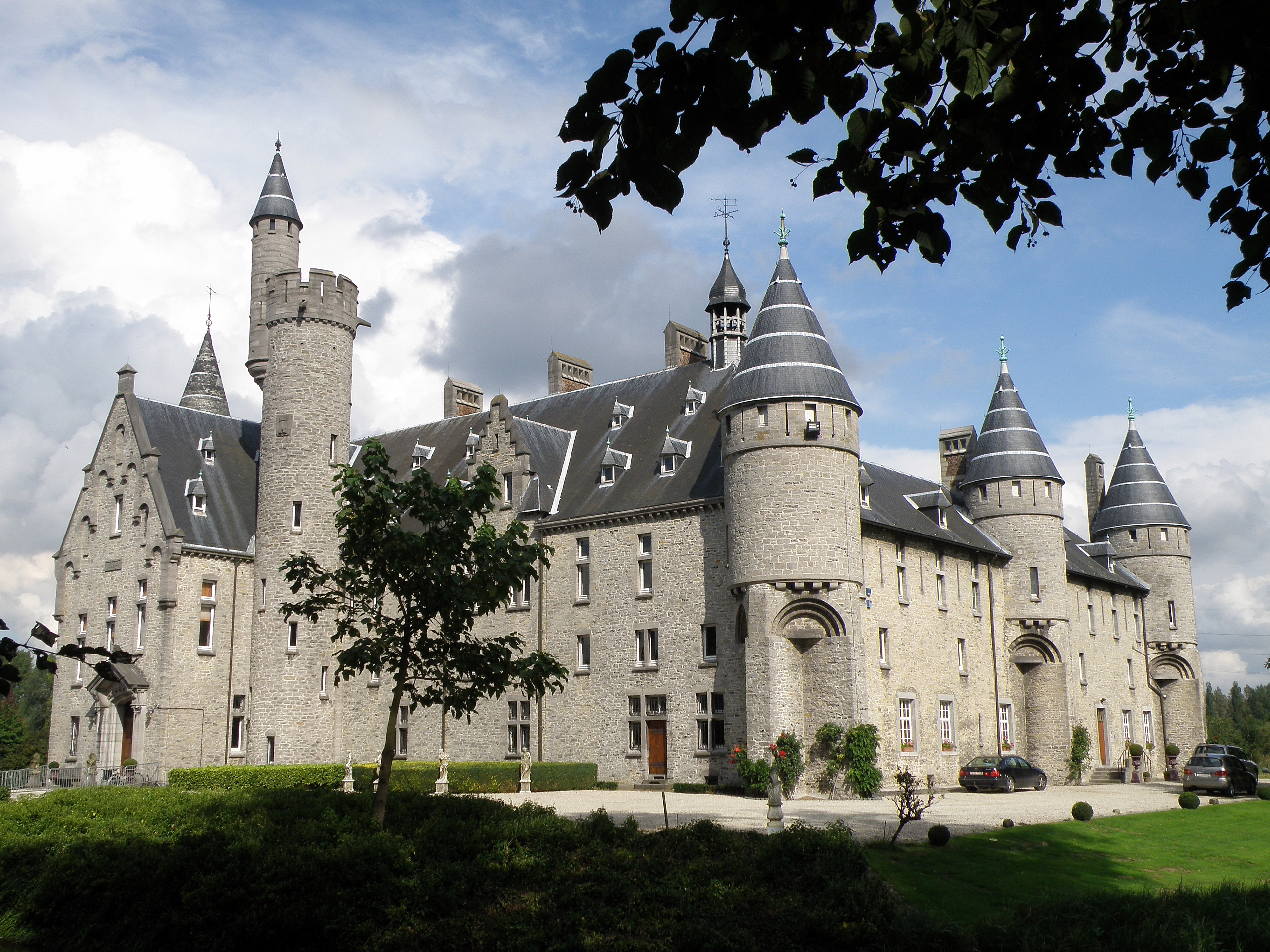
Bornem Castle was during a short period owned by the Count of Lannoy-Beaurepaire

The county of Beaurepaire in Avesnes was inherited by descendants of Louise-Michèle d'Oignies: her father Maximilien d'Oignies was the first Count of Beaurepaire. His youngest grandson Ignace-Philippe became the 3rd Count of Beaurepaire.

Ignace I Philippe de Lannoy, 3rd Count of Beaurepiare, (1650–1715):
married to Marie-Françoise de Coloma, Lady of Bornhem

  1. François-Joseph-Louis de Lannoy, 4th Count of Beaurepaire;
    Married to Marguerite Madeleine de Clermont-Tonnere.
  2. Charles-François-Ignace de Lannoy, 5th Count of Beaurepaire, (1686–1752): Knight of St Lazare in 1717;
    Married to Alix-Barbe de St-Vaast.
    1. Ignace II Godefroi de Lannoy, 6th Count of Beaurepaire, (1723–1794):
      Military Knight of Saint-Louis: Executed by Guillotine in France.
  3. Claude-François de Lannoy
  4. Adrien-François-Joseph de Lannoy, Knight of St Lazarus.
  5. Aldegonde Eleonore de Lannoy; Lady of Bornem:
    Married to Baudry Adelbert, Count de Marnix, Baron of Rollecourt; Heirs of Bornem Castle.
    1. Claude-François de Marnix, Baron of Rollencourt.

=== Lords of Clairvaux ===
Albert-Eugène inherited the rights and Dominium of Clairvaux (now Clervaux), in the Duchy of Luxembourg, after the death of his parents. He was created for his merit as imperial ambassador 1st Baron of Clairvaux. A Cadet branch inherited the title of Princes of Rheina-Wolbeck (or Rheina-Wolbecq), a former German Sovereign State.

Albert-Eugène de Lannoy, 1st Baron of Clairvaux;
married to Anne Margarethe de Reede.

  1. Andrien I Gérard de Lannoy, 2nd Baron of Clairvaux
  2. François-Ferdinand, Count of Lannoy
    1. Adrien II Damien-Gérard-Ernest de Lannoy, 1st Count of Clairvaux; Count of the Empire.
      1. Adrien III Jean-Baptiste de Lannoy, Baron of Clairvaux.
        1. Félix-Balthasar de Lannoy
        2. Florent Stanislas-Amour de Lannoy-Clairvaux;
          Married to Clementine-Josephine of Loos-Corswarem, Princess of Rheina-Wolbecq.
          1. Napoleon de Lannoy-Clairvaux, Prince of Rheina-Wolbecq.

=== Princes of Sulmona ===
Jean I de Lannoy

  1. Jean II, Lord of Lannoy (1410–1493), Flemish diplomat;
    Married to Jeanne of Croy.
    1. Jean III, Lord of Lannoy
    2. Antoine de Lannoy, Lord of Maingoval;
      Married to Marie de Ville.
      1. Jean IV de Lannoy, Lord of Maingoval:
        Married to Philipotte de Lalaing.
        1. Charles de Lannoy, 1st Prince of Sulmona (1487–1527): Knight of the Golden Fleece; soldier and statesman.
          1. Philip de Lannoy, 2nd Prince of Sulmona: Knight of the Golden Fleece:
            Married to Isabelle Colonna.
            1. Charles II de Lannoy, 3rd Prince of Sulmona, (1514–1553); died without heirs.
            2. Horacio de Lannoy, 4th Prince of Sulmona: Knight of the Golden Fleece, died without heirs.

=== Current comital branch ===
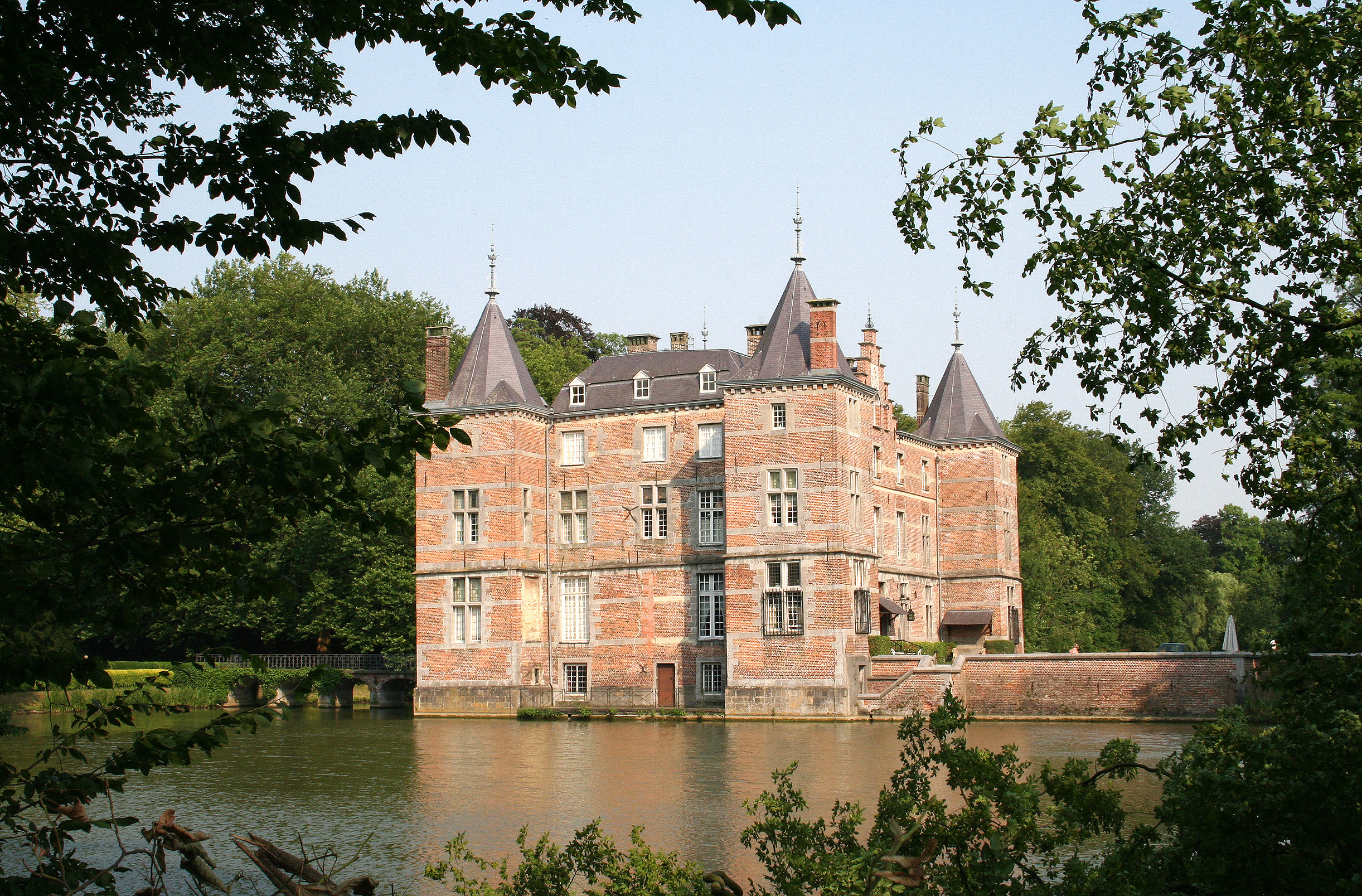
Anvaing Castle, Residence of the Count de Lannoy,

The current main branch of the family resides in Anvaing and descends from Jacques-Adrien-François de Lannoy (1769–1835) who was married to Louise-Marie-Caroline d'Ursel, older sister of the 4th Duke d'Ursel.

Gustave-Ferdinand de Lannoy (1800–1892);
Married to Josephine-Charlotte van der Noot d'Assche, she was the only daughter of, Maximilien-Louis, 7th Marquess of Assche and Wemmel, 3rd Count van der Noot.

  1. Charles-Maximilien de Lannoy (1828–1901);
    Married to Emma, countess du Parc-Locmaria, daughter of Alain, Marquess du Parc-Locmaria.
    1. Philippe, Count de Lannoy (1866–1937):
      Master of the Royal Household of Queen Elisabeth, Mayor of Anvaing. Married to Rosalie de Beeckman (1877–1963).
      1. Paul, Count de Lannoy (1898–1980);
        Married to Beatrix, princesse de Ligne (1898–1982).
        1. Philippe, count de Lannoy (1922–2019);
          Married to Alix della Faille de Leverghem (1941–2012)
          1. Jehan, count de Lannoy (born 1966)
          2. Stephanie, Countess de Lannoy (born 1984),
            Married to Guillaume V, Grand Duke of Luxembourg.
    2. Maurice de Lannoy (1884–1942);
      Married to Viscountess Louise de Spoelberch (1888–1953)

== See also ==
- List of noble families in Belgium

== Bibliography ==
- Europäische Stammtafeln, J.A. Stargardt Verlag, Marburg, Schwennicke, Detlev (Ed.). Volume VIII, Table 9
