= Roy-Boissy =

- Commune
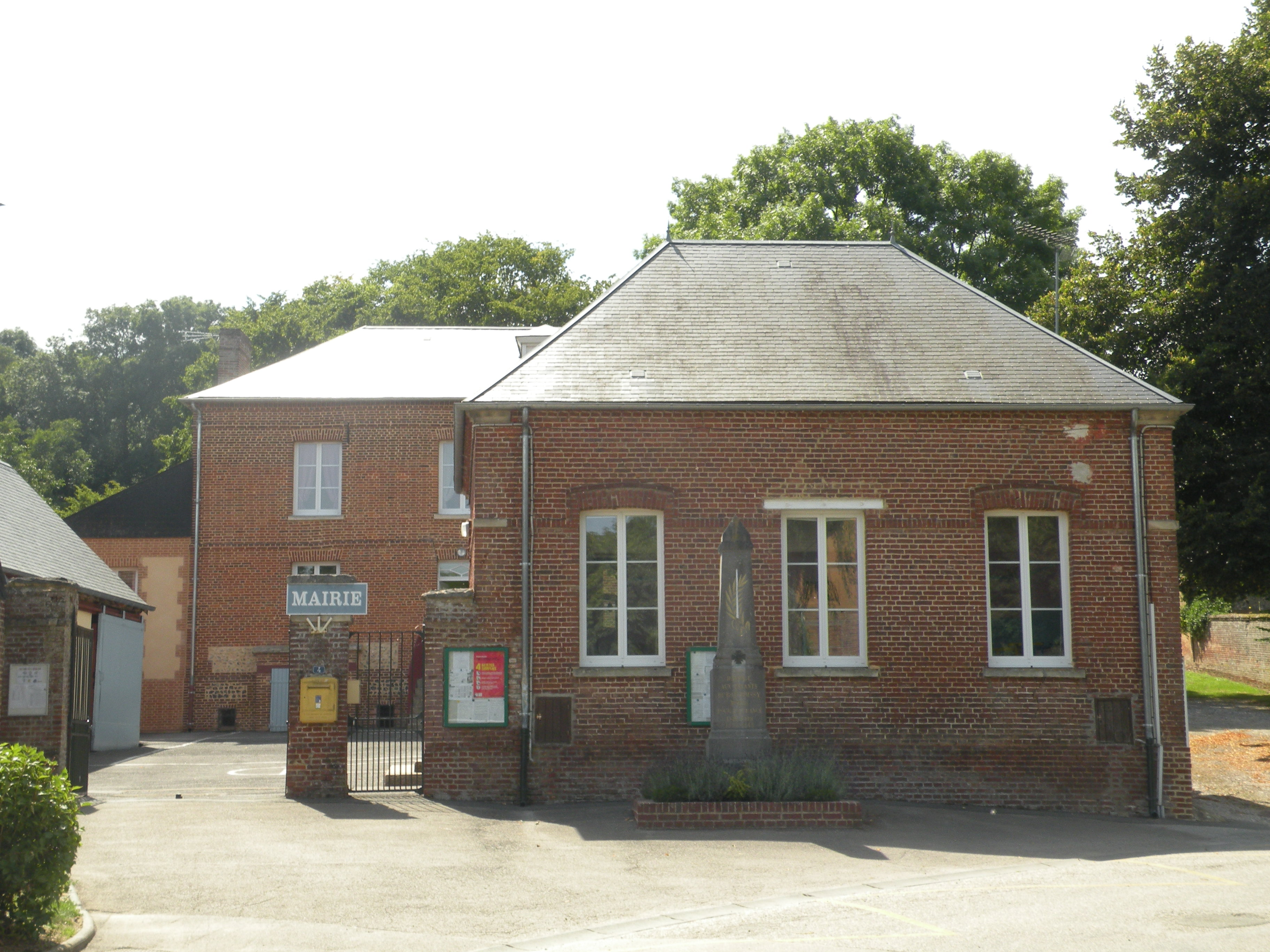
- The town hall in Roy-Boissy
- Location of Roy-Boissy
- Location within France Location within Hauts-de-France
- Coordinates: 49°35′01″N 1°55′26″E
- Country: France
- Region: Hauts-de-France
- Department: Oise
- Arrondissement: Beauvais
- Canton: Grandvilliers
- Intercommunality: Picardie Verte

Government
  - Mayor (2020–2026): Nadine Pétigny
- Area^{1}: 10.96 km^{2} (4.23 sq mi)
- Elevation: 150 m (490 ft)
- Highest elevation: 182 m (597 ft)
- Lowest elevation: 111 m (364 ft)
- Population (2023): 328
  - Density: 29.9/km^{2} (77.5/sq mi)
- Time zone: UTC+01:00 (CET)
  - Summer (DST): UTC+02:00 (CEST)
- INSEE/Postal code: 60557 /60690
- ^{1} French Land Register data, which excludes lakes, ponds, glaciers > 1 km^{2} (0.386 sq mi or 247 acres) and river estuaries.

Roy-Boissy (French pronunciation: [ʁwa bwasi]) is a commune in the Oise department in northern France.

== See also ==
- Communes of the Oise department
- Lannoy Abbey
