= Broodmeester of Flanders =

Broodmeester of Flanders or Pannetier de Flandre (Master of the Bread / panetarius) was a feudal title. This hereditary title evolved in the Ancien Régime to a ceremonial function.

== History ==
The court had a few ceremonial functions, most known was the chamberlain, Bouteiller (buticularius), Standard-bearer, Woudmeester (Forestarius) and the Seneschal., less known was the Panetarius. This ceremonial function was reserved for an important family and was given from father to son by the Count of Flanders. In 1234 the Broodmeester was requested to attend the table of the Countess of Flanders. This function was paid and he received some privileges.

One of the titles that inherited this function was the Lord of Rode, later the Marquess of Rode.

A similar function existed at the court of the Duke of Burgundy and the King of France.

== List of Broodmeesters ==
Period	Breadmaster
1234	Jan van Belleghem
1257-	Gerard of Roden, Lord of Snelleghem
-1367	Jan van Munte
	Lopez-Maria Rodriguez d'Evora y Vega, 1st Marquess of Rode
	Jean Joseph Lopez Rodriguez de Evora y Vega, 2nd Marquess of Rode
	Emmanuel Joseph Rodriguez de Evora y Vega, 3rd Marquess of Rode

== See ==
- Grand Panetier of France
- Grand Huntsman of Brabant
