= Simón Rodríguez (disambiguation) =

Simón Rodríguez was a Venezuelan philosopher and educator.

Simón Rodríguez may also refer to:

== People ==
- Simão Rodrigues de Azevedo, Portuguese Jesuit priest
- Simon Rodriguez de Evora, Flemish noble

== Places ==
- Simón Rodríguez Municipality, Anzoátegui, Venezuela
- Simón Rodríguez Municipality, Táchira, Venezuela

== See also ==
- Samon Reider Rodríguez, Cuban footballer
