= Lord Chamberlain of the Archduchess =

Lord Chamberlain of the Archduchess was a ceremonial function at the imperial court of Brussels.

This position was given to important members of the Nobility of Brabant and Flanders, in service of Prince Charles Alexander of Lorraine and archduchess Maria Christina, imperial governess of the Habsburg Netherlands.

== Lord Grand Chamberlains in Imperials Service ==
- 1751-1756: Eugène-Hyacinthe de Lannoy, 5th Count of la Motterie: Grand Marshall and Lord Grand Chamberlain of the Imperial Court.
- 1756-1760: Maximilian Emanuel, 3rd Prince of Hornes
- 1764-1773: Charles I Emmanuel, 1st Prince de Gavre; Grand Marshall and Lord Grand Chamberlain of the Imperial Court
- 1775-1780: François I Joseph, 2nd Prince de Gavre; Grand Marshall and Lord Grand Chamberlain of the Imperial Court

== Lord Chamberlains in Imperial Service ==
=== Princes ===
- The Prince of Béthune

=== Dukes ===
- the Duke of Arenbergh, (1751-1768)
- The Duke of Beauffort
- The Duke of Ursel: Charles, 2nd Duke d'Ursel

=== Marquesses ===
- The Marquess of Arconati, (1751-1772)
- The Marquess of Assche, (1755-1757)
- The Marquess of Bournonville, (1745-1754)
- The Marquess of Deynze, (1745-1774)
- The Marquess of Ayseau.
- The Marquess of Herzelles, (1745-59)
- The Marquess of Hoensbroech, (1771-1772)
- The Marquess of Yves
- The Marquess of La Puente, (1767-1780)
- The Marquess of Laverne, (1745-1743)
- The Marquess of Rode, (1761-1766)
- The Marquess of Wemmel, (1766-1780)
- The Marquess of Westerloo, (1745-1770)
- The Marquess of Chasteler, (1763-1768)
- The Marquess of Ittres
- The Marquess of Spontin

=== Counts ===
- The Count Charles of Arenberg: (1745-1768)
- The Count of Alcase
- The Count of Argenteau
- The Count of Bucoy
- The Count of Bournonville
- The Count of Blois
- The Count of Corswarem: Charles-Alexandre-Auguste, Count of Corswarem-Looz
- The Count of Ferraris
- The Count of Lichtervelde
- The Count of Ligneville
- The Count of Maldeghem
- The Count of Mérode
- The Count of Nassau-Corroy
- The Count of Lannoy
- The Count of Rindsmaul
- The Count of Rumbecq
- The Count of Spanghen
- The Count of Spontin
- The Count of Thiennes
- The Count vander Steghen
- The Count van der Noot
- The Count of Vander Noot de Duras

=== Viscounts ===
- The Viscount of Audernaerde: Eugène-François de Lalaing
- The Viscount of Nieuport: Charles-Florent de Preud'homme
- The Viscount of Dipenghnies
- The Viscount of Villers
- The Viscount of Elzéé: Henri-Claude de Namur

== Barons ==
- The Baron of Rommerswael
- The Baron of Inghelmunster
- The Baron of Seckendorff
- The Baron of Overijssche
- The Baron vander Gracht

=== Others ===
- The lord of Brederode
