= Lords of Corswarem =

Heads of the noble house of Corswarem-Looz

Coat of arms of the Lords of Corswarem

The Lords of Corswarem are the heads of the noble house of Corswarem-Looz. The current Dukes of Corswarem are descendants of Lords of Corswarem. The current Duke, Thierry is the 11th Duke of Corswarem-Looz.

See also separate article House of Looz-Corswarem.

== List ==
=== Lords of Corswarem ===
Originally the Lords of Corswarem belong to a branch of the Lords and counts of Los. the first mentioned in the Supplement aux Trophees is Robert of Los, lord of Corswarem, married to Ida; Lady of Geneffe. He acted a foundation in 1247 in a foundation for Herckenrode Abbey. He participated to the Seventh Crusade of Louis IX of France with his three sons, and arrived in 1249 in Damiate.

Robert of Looz, Lord of Corswarem x Ida of Geneffe.

  1. Arnoult I of Los, Lord of Corswarem x Eleonore; Lady of Niel.
    1. Arnoult II of Los, Lord of Corswarem x Aleydis of Warfuzee.
      1. Arnoult III of Los, Lord of Corswarem. x Marie de Chabot.
        1. Arnoult IV of Los, Lord of Corswarem x Catherine Alix de Warfuzee.
          1. Arnoult V of Los, Lord of Corswarem x Joanne Alix, Lady of Argenteau.
            1. Arnoult VI of Los, Lord of Corswarem, died 1399 x Elisaneth of Berlo
              1. Thierry de Loos-Coswarem, Lord of Neuville x Catherine de Hemtinne.
                1. Wauthier de Loos-Coswarem x Marie-Fraçoise de Mérode
                  1. Jean de Loos-Coswarem x Isabeau de Ligne.
                    1. Jacques de Looz-Corswarem: See further
              2. Guillaume de Looz-Corswarem
                1. Guikllaume II de Looz-Corswarem x Aleydis Lady of Aerschot, Riviere
                  1. Engelbert de Looz-Corswaremx Catherine, lady of Argenteau.
              3. Arnoult VII of Looz, Lord of Corswarem
        2. Catherine of Los-Corswarem x Renault, Lord of Argenteau.
          1. Gérard, Lord of Argenteau x Philipotte of Houfalize.

=== Counts of Looz-Corswarem and Holy Empire ===
Catherine of Looz-Corswarem x Jacques de Looz-Corswarem, son of Jean I de Corswarem x Isabeau de Ligne.

  1. François I, Count de Looz-Corswarem, (1551-1593) x Antoinette de Gulpen.
    1. Jean, Count de Looz-Corswarem, died 1657
    2. Erasme, Count de Looz-Corswarem x Marie de Binckem.
      1. Hubert, Count de Looz-Corswarem: became in 1652 1st Baron of Longchamp.
        1. Jean-Hubert, Count de Looz-Corswarem: see further.
      2. François II, Count de Looz-Corswarem, married Marie Hamilton.
        1. Joseph, Count de Looz-Corswarem x Madeleine Thérèse, Countess de Looz-Corswarem
          1. Joseph-Clément, Count de Looz-Corswarem: See Further.
  2. Jacques II died 1621 x Agnes de Byelandt
  3. Philipotte, married Philippe, Lord of Berlaymont.

=== Dukes of Corswarem-Looz ===
The ducal line is not had the possibility to continue straight from father to son, after the death of the 3rd Duke, another line had to be recognised by the crown. The descendants of François II continued the line of dukes. In the 17th century the dukes had large connection in the Holy Roman Empire, and no difficulties to find a bride of good house.

Jean Hubert, Count of Corswarem-Looz, 2nd Baron of Longchamps: married Marguerite-Claire de Ligny-Argenteau

  1. Nicolas-François, de Corswarem-Looz, 3rd Baron of Longchamps x Marie-Françoise de Trazignies: no heirs.
  2. Antoine-Hubert, Count of Corswarem-Looz: died without heirs.
  3. Louis-Félix, 1st Duke of Corswarem Looz:Married
    1st/ Hélène-Thérese de Spanghen d'Uyternesse,
    2nd/ Marie-Françoise d'assignies.
    1. Charles-Louis-August-Ferdinand-Emmanuel, 3rd Duke of Corswarem-Looz and Prince of Rheina-Wolbecq (1769-1822): Imperial Lord Chamberlain.
      x Princess of Prussia: No heirs.
    2. Charles-Alexandre-Auguste, Count of Corswarem-Looz: Lord Chamberlain of the Archduchess.
    3. Jean-Florent-Lamoral-Louis-Charles-François, Count of Corswarem-Looz
  4. Jean-Jacques, Count of Corswarem-Looz:
    married to Marie-Florence Coloma, countess of Bornhem. daughter of Pedro II Coloma, 3rd Baron of Bornhem.
  5. Emmanuel-Marie, Count of Corswarem-Looz, married to Marie-Thérèse de Bassignies.
  6. Joseph-Philippe, 2nd Duke of Corswarem-Looz x Marie-Elisabeth de Beer : No heirs.

Joseph-Clément, Count de Looz-Corswarem x Jeanne-Marie d'Anglure

  1. Guillaume-Joseph, 4th Duke of Corswarem-Looz x Marie-Emmanuelle, Baroness of Aix
    1. Clementine-Josephine de Corswarem-Looz; married to Florent Stanislas-Amour de Lannoy-Clairvaux
      1. Napoleon de Lannoy-Clairvaux, Prince de Rheina-Wolbecq.
    2. Charles-Louis-Auguste, 5th Duke of Corswarem-Looz x Marie-Caroline de Nue.
      1. Charles-Napoleon, 6th Duke of Corswarem-Looz x Hermine de Lonckhorst.

== See also ==
- House of Looz-Corswarem for other members of the current family
