= House of Looz-Corswarem =

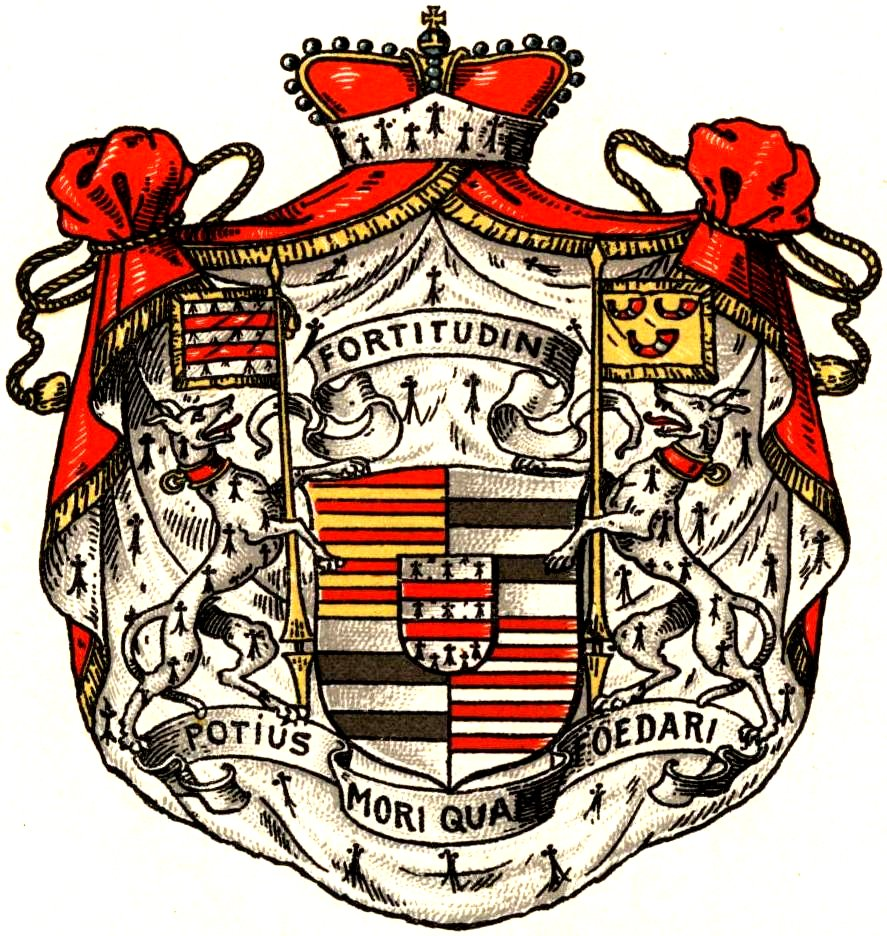
Looz-Corswarem coat of arms

The House of Looz-Corswarem is an old ducal family that mostly occupied territories in what was once Austrian Netherlands, originally from the County of Loon (Comté de Looz in French). As reigning Princes of the Principality of Rheina-Wolbeck, a Sovereign State with an area of 556 square Kilometers and capital city Rheine, they also belonged to the German nobility. The immediate territory of the family was mediatised by the Grand Duchy of Berg in 1806. As a former ruling or the mediatised one the family belonged to the small circle of high nobility who enjoyed equal rights for marriage purposes with the royal or reigning families. Their motto is: Potius mori quam foedari. The family had a hereditary seat in the Upper House (Erste Kammer) of the parliament of the Kingdom of Hannover and were members of the Prussian House of Lords. Today, the family still belongs to the Belgian nobility.

== History ==
The current family is formed by descendants of the Lords of Corswarem and were in service of the Lords of Loon. The head of the House is styled Duke of Looz-Corswarem while his children are Princes and other members are Counts.

== Dukes of Looz-Corswarem ==
- Guillaume, 4th Duke 1792-1803 (1732-1803)
  - Charles, 5th Duke 1803-1822 (1769-1822)
    - Charles, 6th Duke 1822-1896 (1804-1896)
      - Charles, 7th Duke 1896-1911 (1833-1911)
      - Prince Ernest (1834-1868)
        - Charles, 8th Duke 1911-1946 (1860-1946)
    - Prince Guillaume (1817-1887)
      - Prince Camille (1853-1929)
        - Camille, 9th Duke 1946-1968 (1887-1968)
          - Robert, 10th Duke 1968-1997 (1914-1997)
            - Thierry, 11th Duke 1997–present (b.1948)
              - Hereditary Prince Guillaume (b.1983)
                - Prince Theotime

== Notable members ==
- Marie de Loos-Corswarem: founded the Cistercian Abbey of La Paix-Dieu at Jehay.
- Jean de Looz-Corswarem: died in battle of Rocroy, 1643.
- Jean-Jacques de Looz-Corswarem : in service of the elector of Bavaria.
- Caroline-Arnoldine de Looz-Corswarem: married José de la Riva Agüero, president of Peru.
  - José de la Riva-Agüero y Looz-Corswarem
- Marc-André de Looz: American nuclear fusion engineer.

== See also ==
- Lords of Corswarem: list of the Lords, Counts and Dukes of Corswarem.
- County of Loon
