= Marquess of Rode =

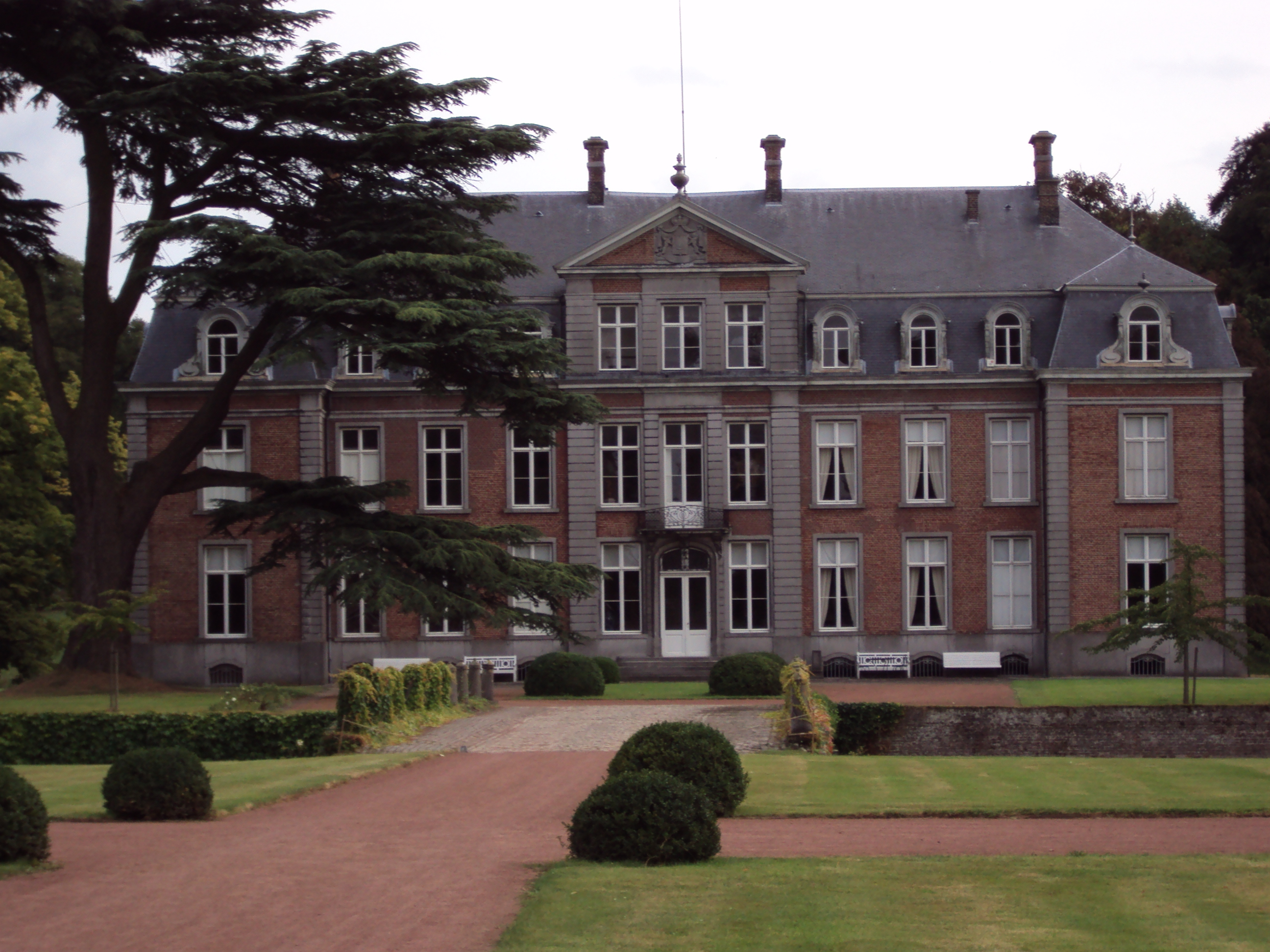
Beerlegem Castle or "Ten Bieze Castle", property of the late Countess de Spangen d'Evora

Marquess of Rode is a former title of the Belgian nobility, now extinct. Rode is a former part of Schelderode in Flanders.

== History ==
The dominium of Rode was the property of don Simon Rodriguez de Evora who had bought the property in 1602; he was created Baron of Rode by permission of the archdukes Albrecht and Isabella.

The title of Marquess was created in 1680 by King Charles II of Spain for Lopez-Maria Rodriguez d'Evora y Vega, 1st Marquess of Rode, the oldest son of Simon Rodriguez de Evora y Vega, baron of Rode. The house of Evora y Vega was heredery Pannetier héréditaire de Flandres (pannetier van Vlaanderen). His descendants continued to use the title until the last family member died in 1920.

The last marquessa, dona Maria Rodriguez de Evora y Vega resided in Beerlegem Castle. She married the Count Charles Victor de Spangen, and their descendants still reside in Beerlegem Castle. Currently this are members of the house of d' Ursel. Another residence was the Goet Ter Saelen.

== Members ==
Don Simon Rodriguez de Evora, 1st Baron of Rode.

  - Doña Gracia Rodriguez d'Evora, (+1660): Lady of Melle, ter Zale and Rode
    married to don Francisco de Vega.
    - Lopez-Maria Rodriguez d'Evora y Vega, 1st Marquess of Rode
      - Jean Joseph Rodriguez de Evora y Vega, 2nd Marquess of Rode
        - Jean Joseph Antoine de Evora y Vega, 4th Marquess of Rode
      - Emannuel Joseph de Evora y Vega, 3rd Marquess of Rode, (1700-1756): Baron of Beerleghem.
        Married to Marie Joigny de Paemele.
        - Charles Joseph Antoine de Evora y Vega, 5th Marquess of Rode:
          Married to Isabella Catharina Malcampo, daughter of Charles, Lord of Schoonberghe.
          - Charles Joseph Antoine Rodriguez de Evora y Vega, Marquess of Rode, (1759-1830):
            Married Therese de Draeck, Lady of the Starry cross.
            - Charles Frederique Rodriguez de Evora y Vega, Marquess of Rode
              - Theodule Rodriguez de Evora y Vega, Marquess of Rode: married to Louise of Trevey.
              - Adolphe Rodriguez de Evora y Vega, Marquess of Rode.
              - Maria Rodriguez de Evora y Vega, Marquessa of Rode (1822-1920):
                Married to Count Charles Victor de Spangen d'Uyternesse.(1813-1873)
                - Marie-Thérèse, Countess de Spangen (1863-1940), last heir: marries to Louis, count de Marchant et d'Ansembourg (1858-1926).
              - Ida Rodriguez de Evora y Vega, Marquessa of Rode : Marr. Leon Count d´Andelote.
          - Marie Madeleine Rodriguez de Evora y Vega, Marquessa of Rode (1760-1842):
            married to Jean-Baptiste, Count d´Hane de Steenhuyze.
            - Charles d'Hane de Steenhuyze: Belgian Minister of Defence
          - Emannuel Charles Rodriguez de Evora y Vega, Marques:
            married to Countess de Lens.
            - Therese Philippina Rodriguez de Evora y Vega, marr. Surmont de Volsberghe.
            - Auguste Maria Rodriguez de Evora y Vega, (1809-) marr. Adelaide Alix de Vaernewyck.
            - Charles Maria Rodriguez de Evora y Vega,
              married to Eugenie, Lady van de Woestyne, family of the Marquess of Becelaere.
        - Adolphe Joseph Rodriguez de Evora y Vega
        - Marie Joseph Rodriguez de Evora y Vega
        - Marie Theresia Rodriguez de Evora y Vega, died 1763
      - Jacques Rodriguez de Evora y Vega, (1703- : Schepen of Ghent.
      - Philippe Charles Rodriguez de Evora y Vega, (1704-)
      - Antoine Joseph Rodriguez de Evora y Vega, (1705-)
