= Lopez-Maria Rodriguez d'Evora y Vega, 1st Marquess of Rode =

Lopez-Maria Rodriguez d'Evora y Vega (died 4 October 1697), was the First Marquess of Rode. He was the Opper Broodmeester of Flanders and had multiple important heerlijkheden.

== History ==
He was the son of Francisco de Vega and Gracia Rodriguez, Lady of Rode. His grandfather Simon Rodriguez de Evora was the 1st baron of Rode. He was in military service of the King of Spain and obtained privileges after a successful career. He participated in the war against Louis XIV of France. He was Knight of the Order of Alcántara.

== Titles ==
- Lord of (heerlijkheid)
  - Waanghem
  - Ter Weede
  - Ter Zalen
  - Broucckstraete
  - Leeke
- Baron of Beerleghem.
- First Marquess of Rode.
- Knight in the Order of Santiago.

== Family ==
He married Anna Isabella de Cortewyle, lady of Laecke and had 8 children:

- Jean Joseph Lopez Rodriguez de Evora y Vega, 2nd Marquess of Rode, baron of Beerlegem died 1716. He was married to Marie Emerantia Blondel.
  - Emmanuel Joseph Rodriguez de Evora y Vega, 3rd Marquess of Rode, 1700–1756. Married to Marie Josepha de Joigny de Pamele.
- Maria Louisa Lopez Rodriguez de Evora y Vega, married Inigo Lamoral, Count of la Tours.
- Lopez Marie Rodriguez de Evora y Vega
- Francois Guillaume Rodriguez de Evora y Vega
- Magdalena Jacoba Rodriguez de Evora y Vega, Lady of Scheldewindeke married the Baron of Lovendegem.
- Isabella Adriana Rodriguez de Evora y Vega, married to Philip-Joseph van Borsele, Lord of Nieuvliet.
- Emmanuel Joseph Rodriguez de Evora y Vega, (1674-1735) became Lord of Moortsele in 1697, married to Robertina Sneps.
- Anne Antoinette Rodriguez de Evora y Vega, married to John Baptist Haccart, mayor of Oudenaarde.
