= Baldwin of Lannoy =

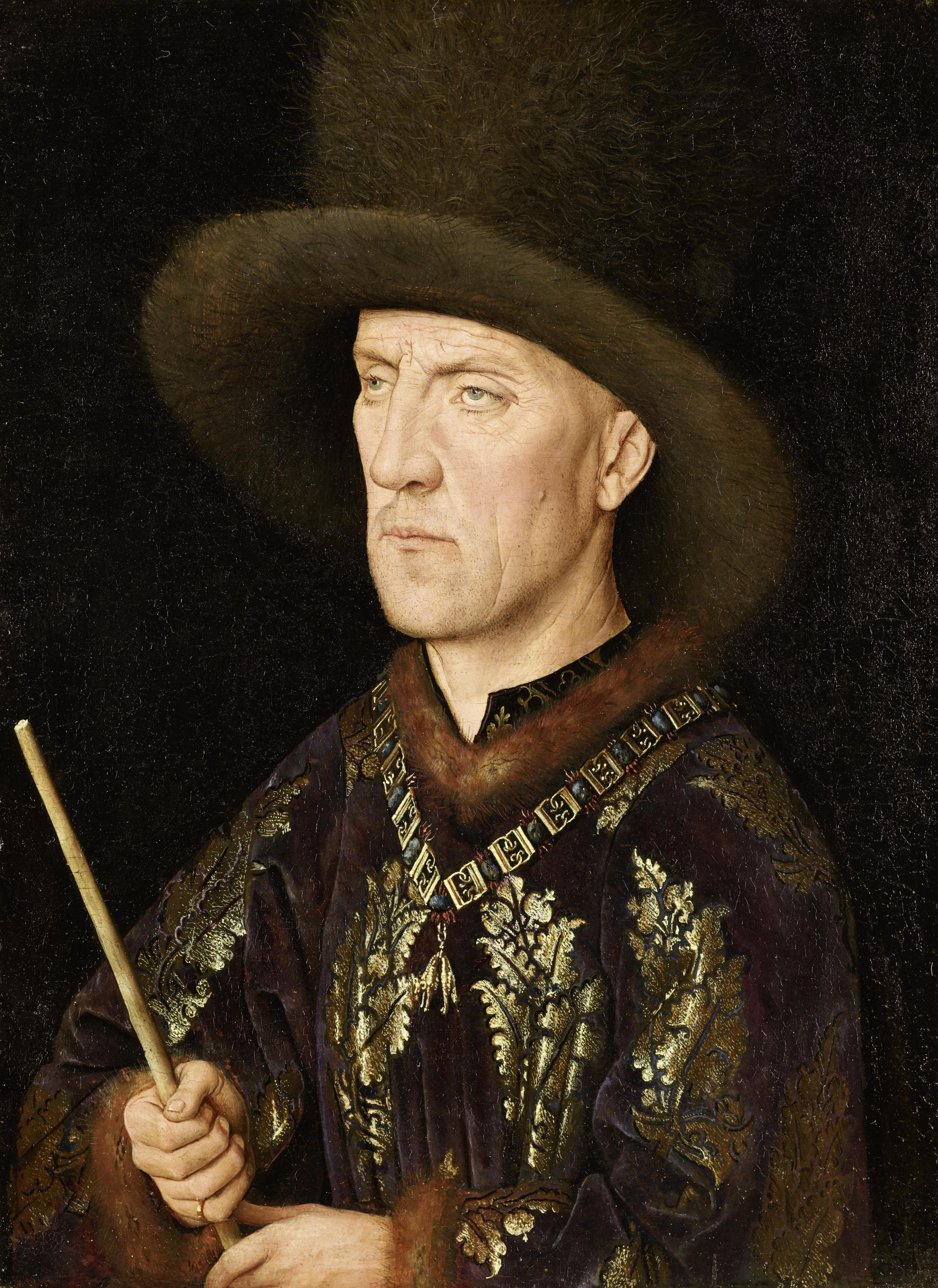
’’Portrait of Baudouin de Lannoy’’, by Jan van Eyck

Baldwin van Lannoy, Lord of Molembais (Baudouin de Lannoy; 1388–1474), nicknamed "Le Bègue" (The Stutterer), was a Flemish statesman, and ambassador for Philip the Good at the court of Henry V of England. He is considered the founder of the Lords of Molenbais branch of the de Lannoy family.

== Early life ==
He was born in 1388 in Hénin-Beaumont into the noble de Lannoy family. He was a son of Guilbert I of Lannoy, Lord of Santes, and Catherine de Saint-Aubin, Lady of Molembais. Among his elder brothers were Guillebert II de Lannoy and Hugo de Lannoy, both diplomats.

== Career ==
During his career, the Lord of Molembais (also Molembaix) was named Governor of Lille.

In 1429, he was one of the twenty Founder Knights of the Order of the Golden Fleece, his official number being 19. When Baldwin became Knight, he commissioned a portrait to be painted by Jan van Eyck.

== Personal life ==
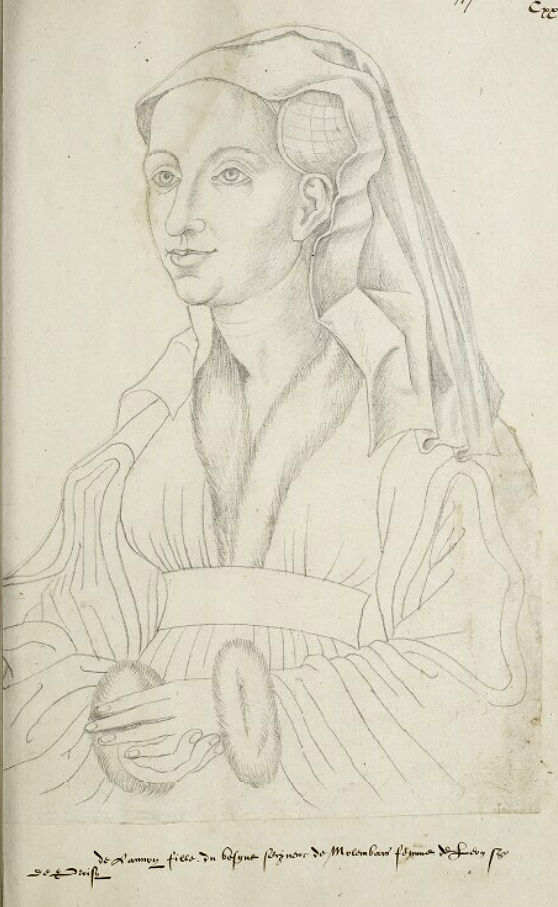
Portrait of his daughter, Anne, wife of Leon de Proisy in the Recueil d'Arras, c. 1570

He married twice; first to Marie, Lady of Melles and secondly to Adrienne de Berlaymont (1400–1493), a daughter of Jacques de Berlaymont and Catherine de Robersart. Together, they were the parents of four children:

- Baudouin "Baldwin" de Lannoy, Lord of Molembais (1436–1501), who was also a Knight of the Golden Fleece; he married Marie d'Esne, Lady of Conroy.
- Philippine de Lannoy (1437–1500), who married to Jean de Jauche, Lord of Mastaing.
- Anne de Lannoy, who married Leon, Lord of Proisy.
- Hugues "Hugo" de Lannoy (1440–1501), who became Canon of Liège Cathedral.

Lannoy died in 1474 in Huppaye.

=== Descendants ===
Through his eldest son Baudouin, he was a grandfather of Philippe I de Lannoy, Lord of Molembais, the Grand Huntsman of Brabant who married Madeleine of Bourgundy (a daughter of Baudouin of Burgundy); Françoise de Lannoy, who married Antoine of Montmorency; Madeleine de Lannoy, who married Jean de Roisinand; and Jacqueline de Lannoy, who married Claude Bouton, Lord of Corbaron.
