= Beamore, Drogheda =

Townland in County Meath, Ireland

Coordinates: 53.692°N 6.344°W

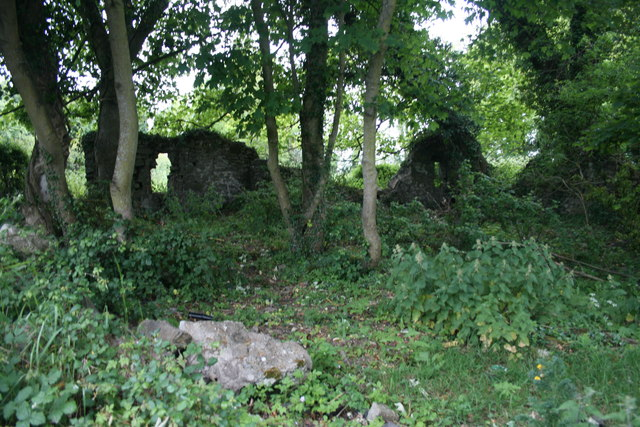
Ruined gatehouse in Beamore townland

Beamore or Bey More (Irish: Béibeac Mór) in County Meath is a townland which lies just south of Drogheda in Ireland. Together with the nearby townland of Bryanstown, Beamore forms part of the southern suburbs of Drogheda (which lies across the county bounds in County Louth).

The remains of a 13th-century monastic settlement and farm, known as Beaubec Monastery, are located in the area.

The townland has an area of approximately 1.2 square miles (3.1 km^{2}), and had a population of 210 people as of the 2011 census.
