= Château d'Anvaing =

Castle in Wallonia

Coordinates: 50.676°N 3.577°E

Anvaing Castle
- Wallonia, Belgium
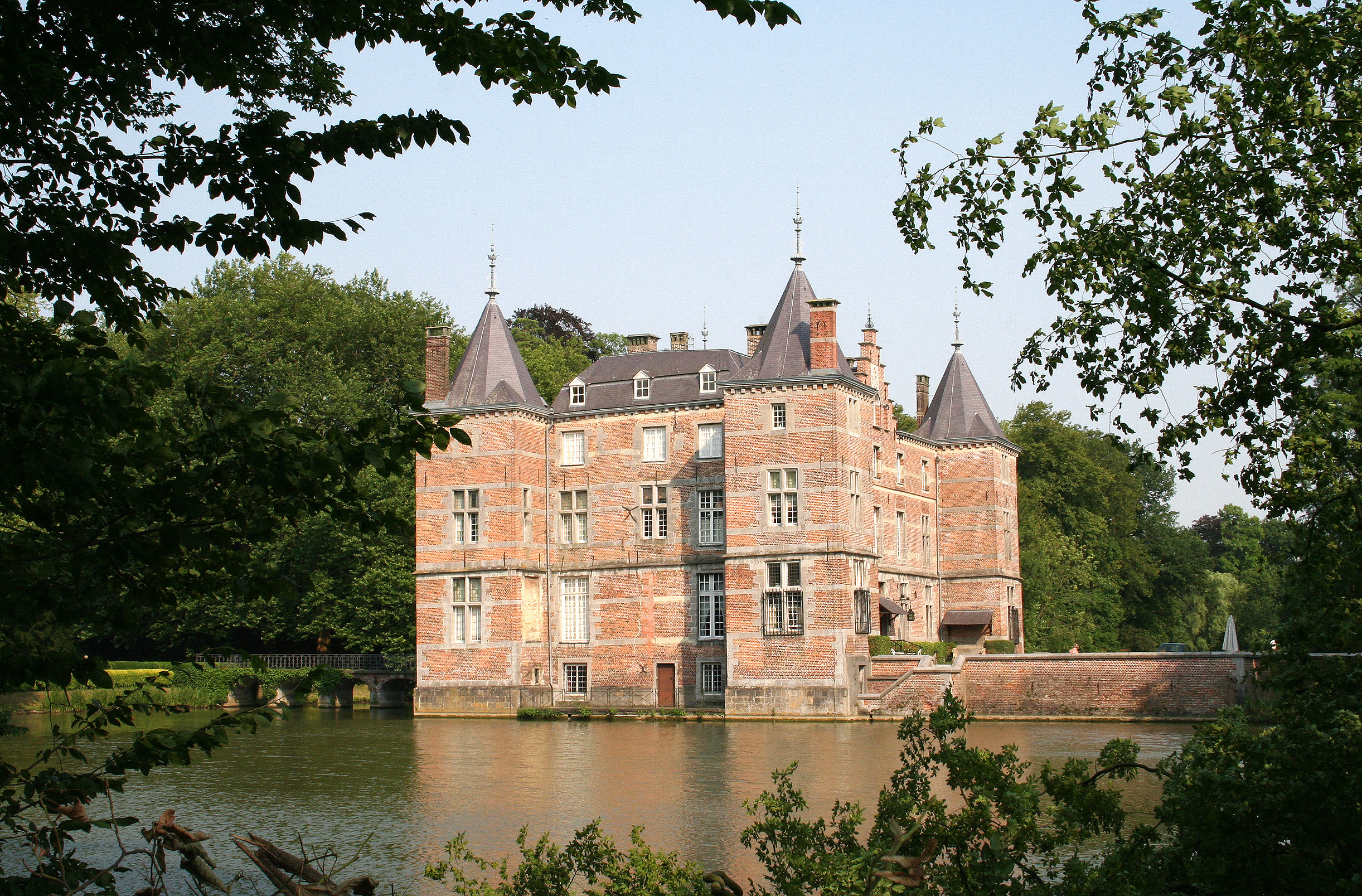

Site information
- Type: Castle
- Owner: House of Lannoy

Garrison information
- Occupants: Philippe, count de Lannoy; born 1922.

Anvaing Castle (French: Château d'Anvaing) or Château de Lannoy is a historic residence in the village of Anvaing in the municipality of Frasnes-lez-Anvaing, province of Hainaut, Wallonia, Belgium.

The site of the Château d'Anvaing has been occupied by a castle since the time of the First Crusade. The first known reference dates from 1127. There is little documentation of the buildings on the site however until the reconstructions of 1561 and 1800. The owners were apparently the Roubaix family, judging from the arms on an early part of the building, and later the comital branch of the de Lannoy family whose descendants still own it. Stéphanie, Grand Duchess of Luxembourg, born to the de Lannoy family, grew up in the castle.

The castle is chiefly notable as the place in which the Belgian capitulation was signed on 28 May 1940, during the Battle of the Lys. At the time, it served as the headquarters of the German 6th Army. The Belgian plenipotentiaries arrived at the castle at 9:35 am. Shortly afterwards, General Olivier Derousseaux and Commandant Liagre were received by General Walther von Reichenau and Major-General Friedrich Paulus. Discussions took place in the dining room. At 10:00 am, the surrender became effective. The document was read and signed. In celebration, a German officer fired a gunshot into the ceiling which is still present.

== See also ==
- List of castles in Belgium
