= Charles d'Hane de Steenhuyze =

Belgian politician (1787–1858)

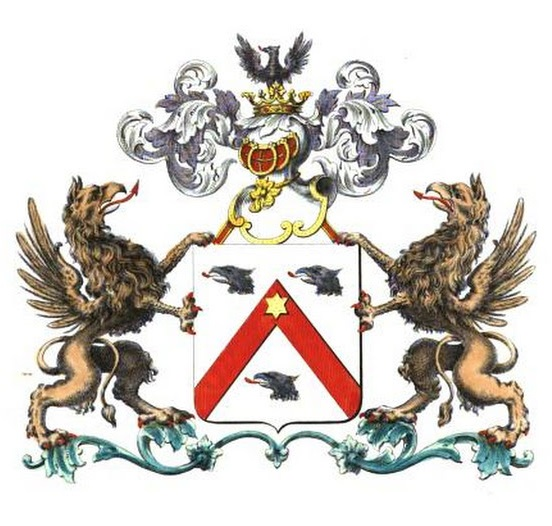
Arms of d'hane

Charles Joseph Marie d'Hane Steenhuyse (30 April 1787 in Ghent – 29 April 1858) was a Belgian politician. He was a landowner and rentier, liberal Schepen in Ghent and a Catholic MP.

== Biography ==
He belonged to a family that extended back a few centuries and had received the title of count from Maria Theresa.

His father was Count Jean-Baptiste d'Hane Steenhuyse (Ghent, 1757–1826), the last lord of the principality Steenhuyse, and his mother was a granddaughter of the 5th Marquess of Rode: Marie-Madeleine Rodriguez (Ghent, 1760 – Leeuwergem 1842). The couple had six children, of whom only Charles had children.

Charles d'Hane married Christine Dons the Lovendeghem (Ghent, 1782–1846) in 1806. They had three daughters and a son who remained childless, ending the family line in 1887.

In 1816, Charles was conferred knighthood of the province of East Flanders. He was appointed chamberlain of King William I.

He was councilor of Ghent and a member of the Provincial Council of East Flanders. As a large part of the Ghent notables, he remained loyal to the United Kingdom of the Netherlands and he took no part in the National Congress in 1831. His brother Constant d'Hane the Steenhuyse became Belgian Minister of War in the crucial period of the defending the young kingdom.

After Belgian independence, he was organizer of the ships of Ghent (1830–1836) and a member of the new provincial council (1836–1842).

In February 1831 he was the commander of a municipal volunteer corps would support the organized effort of alderman to overthrow Colonel Ernest Grégoire. This premeditated effort failed.

So fierce was d'Hane that he gave a big blow during a concert at the Kouter to a political opponent, French Vergauwen, and he was fined by the Criminal Court.

In 1843 d'Hane became the first president of the liberal électorale Société de la Flandre orientale.

However it was a Catholic list he was elected member of parliament in 1847. He stayed only one year in parliament.

== See also ==
- List of defence ministers of Belgium
