= Philippe, Lord of Rubempré =

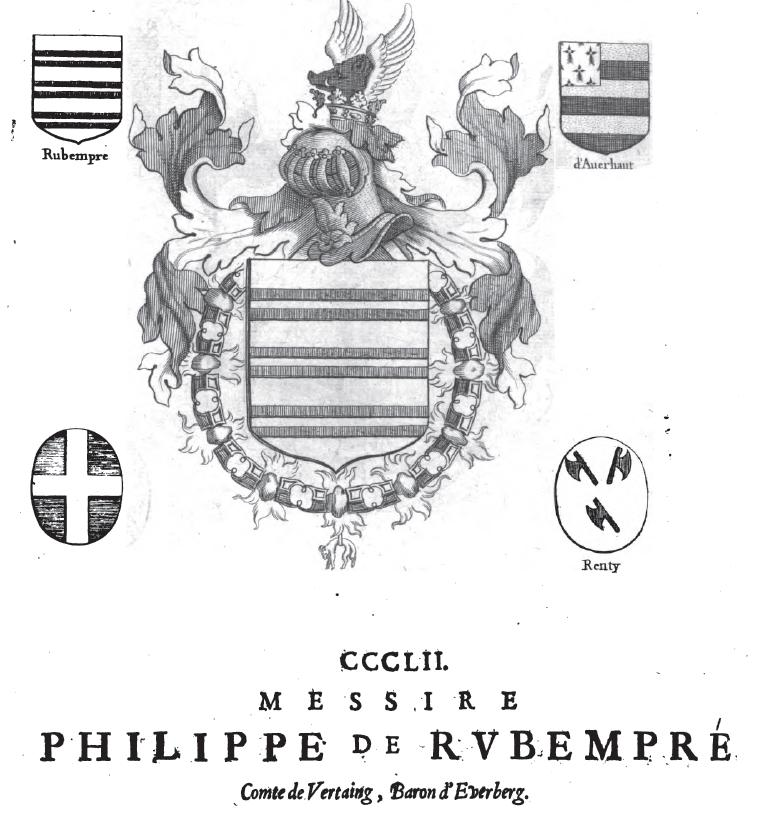
Crest

Philippe, Lord of Rubempré was a Flemish Noble lord who was the son of Antoine III, Lord of Rubempré and Marie d'Averhoult. He was created for merit the 1st Count of Vertaing in 1614 and 1st Baron of Everbergh in 1620 by the Archdukes.

He was in Service of the King of Spain as governor and captain general of Lille and Douai. In 1624 he was admitted to the Order of the Golden Fleece. Between 1599-1621 he succeeded his father in the office of hereditary Grand Huntsman of Brabant.

He married firstly Anne of Croy-Rœulx, daughter of Eustache of Croy-Rœulx.

He married secondly Jacqueline de Recourt-Lens, with a son: Charles-Philippe, Lord of Rubempré, who was the father of Philippe, 1st Prince of Rubempré.
