= Lords of Rubempré =

Belgian feudal lords

Coat of arms of the House of Merode; Princes of Rubempré-Everbergh

The Lords of Rubempré were feudal lords, and the ancestors of the current Princes of Rubempré, belonging to the Belgian Nobility.

Rubempré is currently in Somme; Picardia; France. Baldwin is the First Lord of Rubempré mentioned in 1202. In the 16th century the family was allied to the house of Bourbon-Rubempré.

== Lords of Rubempré ==
	Name	Remarks
1.	Baldwin I	Married to Marie of Pecquigny
2.	Baldwin II	Married to Yoland of Grand-Pré
3.	Antoine I	
4.	Jean I	
5.	Robert I	
6.	Charles I	Son of Robert I; Father of Jeanne of Rubempré, descendants known to be Bourbon-Rubempré.
7.	Antoine II	Son of Robert I
8.	Jean II	Married to Colle de Boussies, Lady of Aubigny
9.	Charles II	Married to Anne, Viscountess of Montenaecken
10.	Charles III	Married to Jeanne de Boussies, Lady of Feluy. His 2nd son Charles IV of Rubempré became Viscount of Montenaecken, with an important descendance.
11.	Antoine III	Married to Marie d'Averhoult
11.	Philippe	Created 1st Count of Vertaing and 1st Baron of Everbergh; knighted of the Golden Fleece; 1st married to Anne of Croy-Rœulx, 2nd marriage to Jacqueline de Recourt-Lens.
12.	Charles-Philippe	2nd Count of Vertaing and Baron of Everbergh; married to Marie d'Averhoult-'Bretagne'.
13.	Philippe, 1st Prince	Last Member of the House of Rubempré; Father of Louise-Brigitte, Princesse of Rubempré

== Princes of Mérode - Rubempré ==
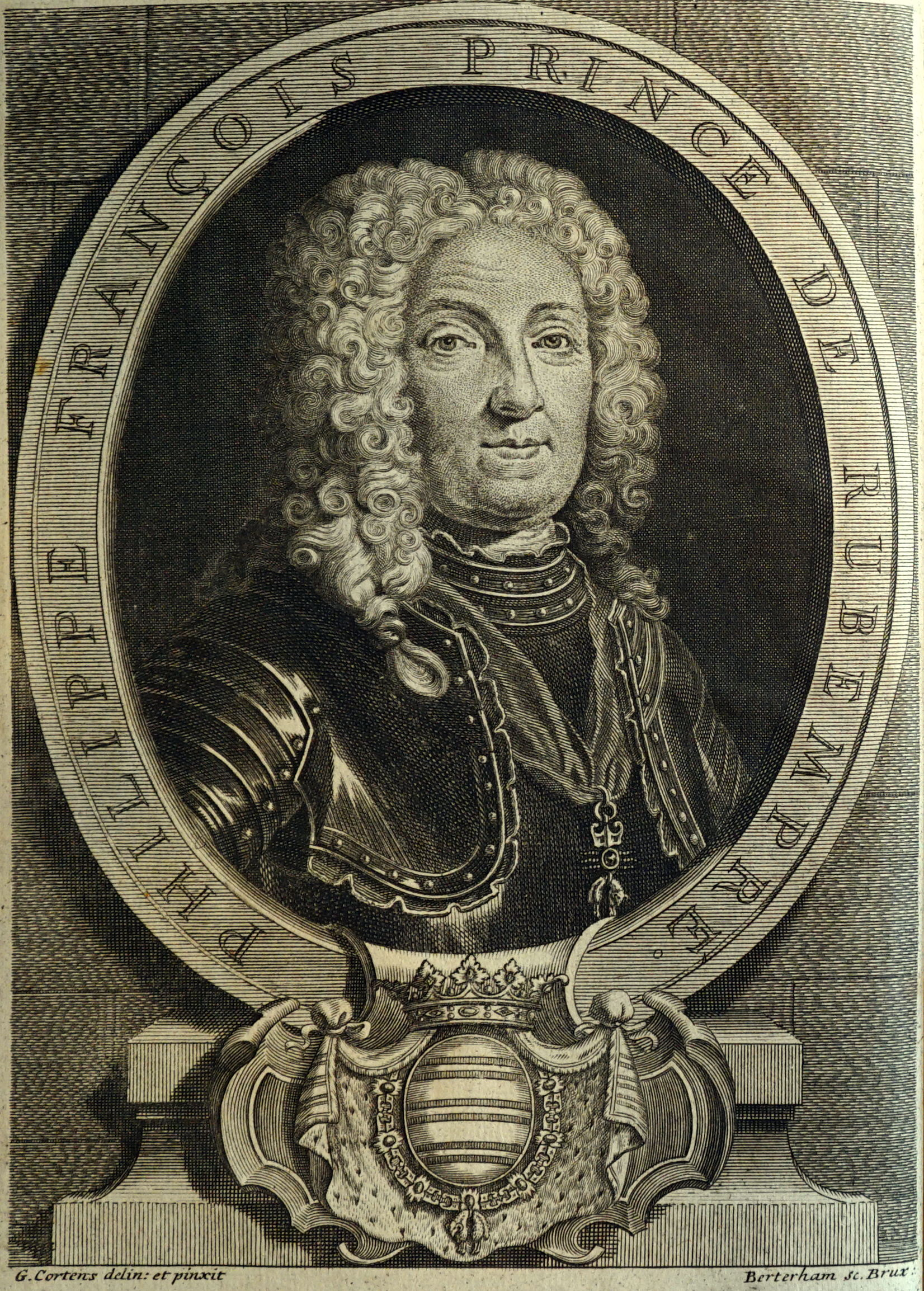
Philippe-François de Mérode, 2nd Prince of Rubempré

The title was incorporated by heritage to the House of Mérode, who stil uses this title upon the current generation. The 2nd Prince inherited the feudal function of Grand Huntsman of Brabant.

	Name	Remarks
14.	Philippe-François de Mérode, 2nd Prince of Rubempré	Prince in 1704 by marriage to Louise-Brigitte de Rubempré.
15.	Maximilien-Leopold de Mérode, 3rd Prince of Rubempré	Married to Catherine Occreman
16.	Guillaume-Charles de Mérode, 4th Prince of Rubempré	Married to Marie-Joseph d'Ognyes
17.	Henri de Mérode, 5th Prince of Rubempré	Founder of the Branch Mérode de Westerlo
18.	Charles de Mérode, 6th Prince of Rubempré	
19.	Henri de Mérode, 7th Prince of Rubempré	
