= Claude Bouton, Lord of Corbaron =

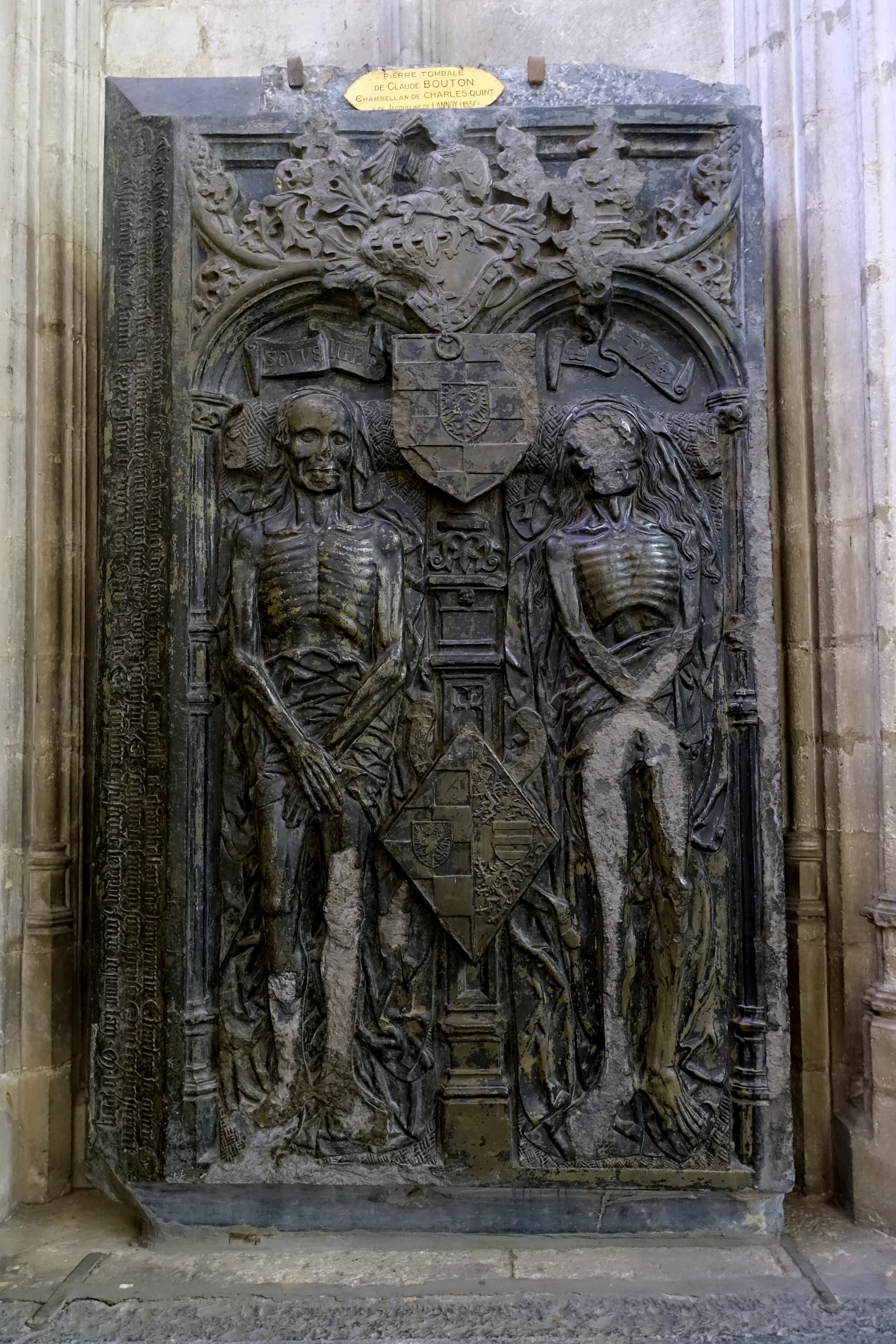
Burial stone inside the Church of Our Blessed Lady of the Sablon, Brussels

Claude Bouton, Lord of Corbaron (c. 1473 - 30 June 1556) was a courtier, poet, and diplomat for the House of Habsburg. He was mainly based in Belgium.

== Family ==
He was married in 1514 to Jacqueline of Lannoy, granddaughter of Baldwin of Lannoy.

== Career ==
Bouton had several appointments in his career.

As well as being a diplomat for the Hapsburgs, he was also;

- a member of the Council of State of Emperor Charles V.
- Captain of the Guard and Master of the Household to Philip I of Castile, son of Emperor Maximilian
- Captain of the Guard and Master of the Household to Ferdinand of Austria
- guardian of Willem; Prince of Orange in 1544.
- a member of the court of Marie of Hungary.

He is also the author of the Mirouer des Dames, written between 1517 and 1523.

Bouton had an important collection of books, amongst them the Douze dames de rhétorique.

== Burial ==
Bouton is buried inside the Church of Our Blessed Lady of the Sablon in Brussels. He had a private chapel constructed for his grave. He and his wife's grave is known for its unusual depiction of the couple, depicting them as skeletal remains.
