= Beaubec Abbey =

Ruined Cistercian abbey in Meath, Ireland

- Béibeac Mór
- Location within Ireland
- Interactive map of Beaubec Abbey

Monastery information
- Other names: de Bello Becco, Bellus - Beccus
- Order: Cistercian
- Established: Uncertain
- Disestablished: Uncertain
- Mother house: Furness
- Diocese: Archdiocese of Armagh

People
- Founder: Walter de Lacy

Site
- Location: Beamore, Drogheda, County Meath
- Coordinates: 53.69344°N 6.34115°W
- Public access: Unknown

Beaubec Monastery was a 13th-century monastic settlement and farm, to the south of Drogheda, in the townland of Beamore in County Meath, Ireland.

== History ==
Little is known of the history of Beaubec. Janauschek states, "some Irish authors argue that a Cistercian abbey existed in this area of eastern Meath, which was founded by Walter de Lacy, Lord of Meath, first as a daughter of Bell-Bec (in Normandy), and later became a cell of Furness. But those who have looked at the documents, understand that the manor of that abbey was there as long as the Normans".

Geraldine Stout, citing Dryburgh and Smith (2006), states that there is no known foundation date for this monastic site but a grant by Walter De Lacy to the church of SS Mary and Laurence of Beaubec and the monks residing there on the lands in Gillekeran has been dated to after 1215.

Excavations of the site were carried out between 2019 and 2020.
