= Hugo van Lannoy =

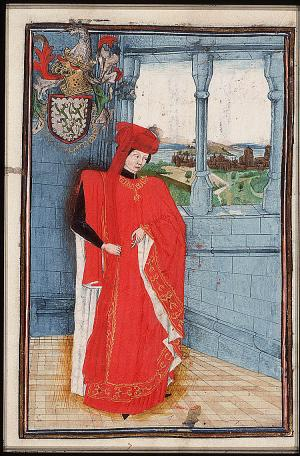
Hugo van Lannoy as Knight in the Order of the Golden Fleece

Hugo van Lannoy (French: 'Hue' or 'Hugues de Lannoy'; 1384 – 1 May 1456), Lord of Santes, was a Flemish statesman in the service of the Dukes of Burgundy, most notably Philip III who founded the Order of the Golden Fleece.

== Biography ==
He was a member of the noble de Lannoy family. He was the son of Guillebert I van Lannoy and Catherine of Molembais.
His brothers were Guillebert of Lannoy and Baldwin of Lannoy, also founding Knights of the Golden Fleece. As a young knight, he travelled to Jerusalem and joined an expedition against the Tatars, who occupied Muscovy. Back in Europe, he served John the Fearless. Hugo also fought in 1415 against the English in the Battle of Agincourt, where he was captured.

After his release, he entered as a diplomat in the service of Philip the Good and helped arrange the marriage between Jacqueline, Countess of Holland and Humphrey of Gloucester.

Arms

When Jacqueline married in secret with Frank van Borssele, Philip the Good annexed the counties of Holland, Zeeland and Hainaut. Hugo van Lannoy became the first Burgundian Stadtholder of Holland and Zeeland.

At the age of 68, Hugo fought against the Revolt of Ghent (1449–1453) between 1452 and 1453. He died without children and was buried in Lille.
