= Lannoy Abbey =

Cistercian abbey in Oise, France

Coordinates: 49°35′21″N 1°54′42″E

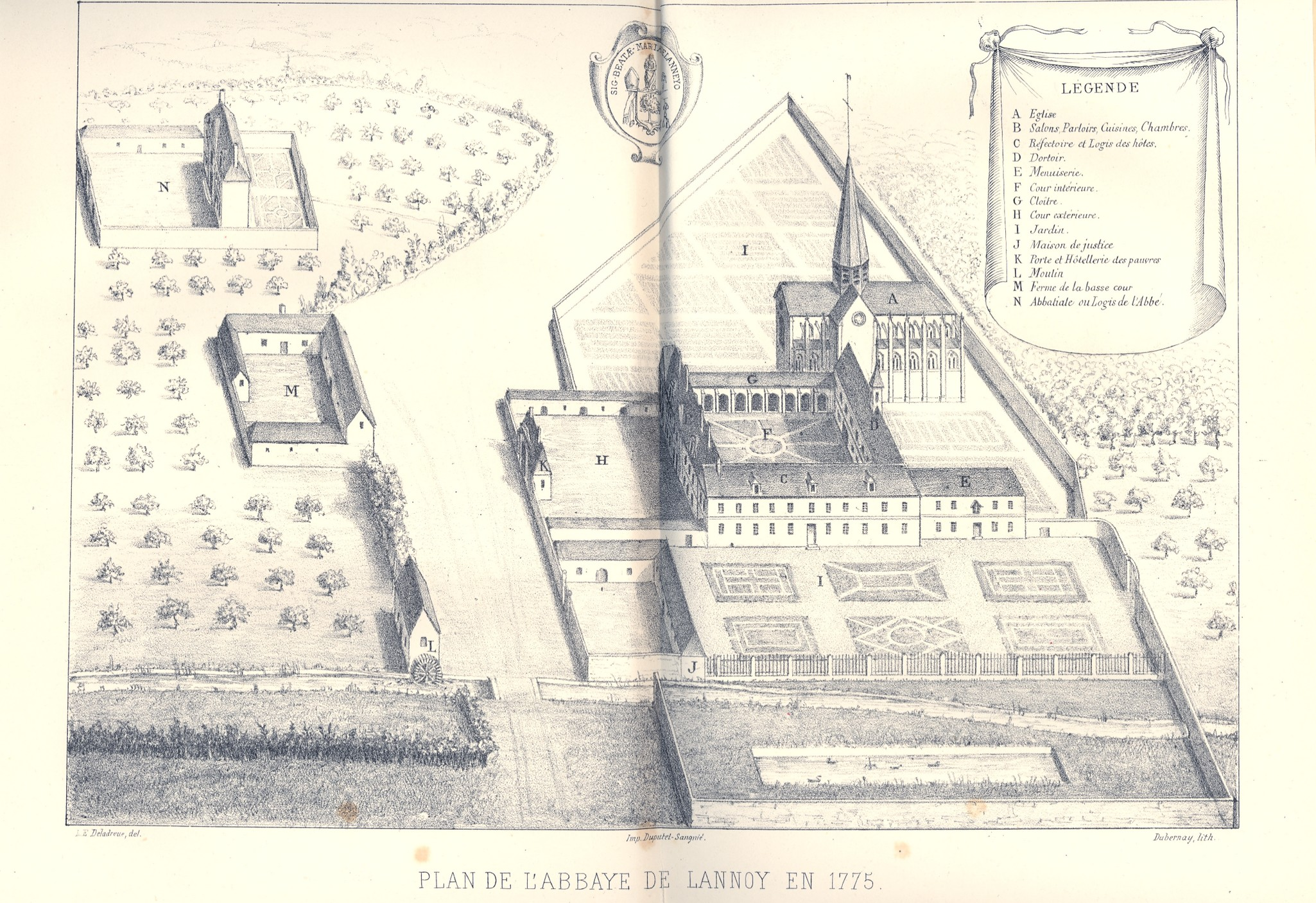
Plan of Lannoy Abbey, 1775

Lannoy Abbey, also called Briostel Abbey, was a Cistercian abbey in present-day Oise, France.

It was founded in 1147, from Beaubec Abbey.
