= Guillebert de Lannoy =

Flemish diplomat (1386–1462)

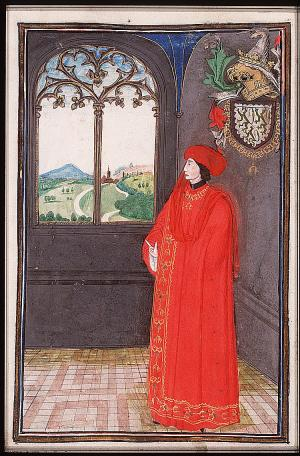
Statuts, Ordonnances et Armorial de l'Ordre de la Toison d'Or, 1473

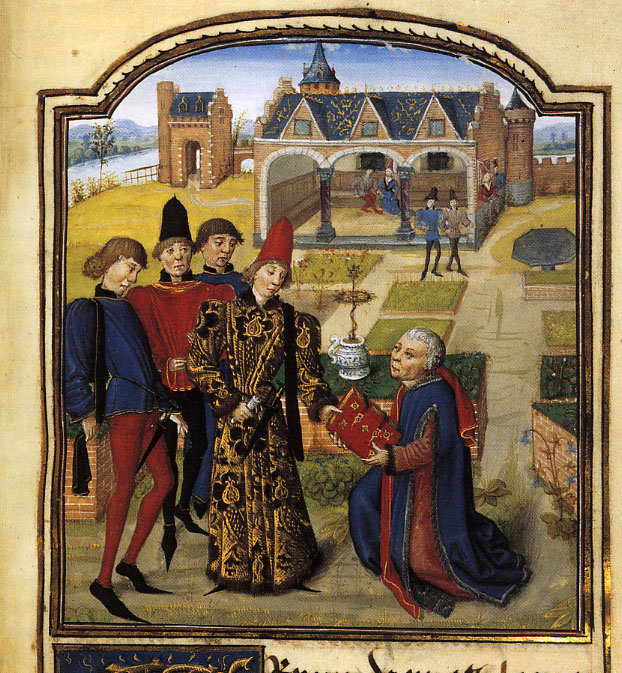
"Foliant de Ionnal" presents his text of L'Instruction de josne prince to "King Rudolph of Norway", c. 1468–1470.

Guillebert de Lannoy (also spelled as Gilbert, Guilbert or Ghillebert; 1386–1462) was a Flemish traveler and diplomat, chamberlain to the duke of Burgundy, governor of the fort of Sluys, and a knight of the Golden Fleece.

== Life ==
He was the son of Guillebert I de Lannoy and Catherine of Molembais. He was a member of the noble de Lannoy family.

His brothers were Hugo of Lannoy and Baldwin of Lannoy, also founding knights of the Golden Fleece.

Guillebert first served Jean de Werchin, seneschal of Hainaut, and accompanied him to the east and to Spain. In 1410, he fought against the Moors and then took the opportunity to visit the Emirate of Granada. He then served John the Fearless in his war against the Prince-Bishopric of Liège and the Armagnac–Burgundian Civil War. He then joined the Teutonic Knights in 1413 and fought in the Polish–Lithuanian–Teutonic War. Although many Western European knights participated in campaigns organized by the Livonian Order, Guillebert decided to visit the neighboring Russian lands, with which the Order was frequently at war, as the next campaign had been postponed by several months.

In the winter of 1413, he visited the Russian cities of Pskov and Novgorod. He left Narva disguised as a merchant and arrived in Novgorod after travelling by sleigh, staying there for nine days. His memoirs provide more details about Pskov and Novgorod than about any other city he ever visited. There, he applies the name Great Russia (la grant Russie) to the region. His travel account, Voyages et Ambassades (1399–1450), contains the only significant Western European description of Russia from the early 15th century. Compared with previous travel accounts, Guillebert's account is the only one that describes the political regime in detail. He notes that Novgorod is a "free city ruled by a community" (i.e. the veche). He also notes: "[T]hey have two officers, one duke and one burgrave, who rule the city and are replaced every year." Finally, he mentions that, despite Novgorod having significant autonomy, the city recognizes the supreme authority of the Grand Principality of Moscow.

Guillebert also fought in 1415 against the English in the Battle of Azincourt or Agincourt, where he was wounded and captured.

In the service of Philip the Good, he discharged several diplomatic missions to France, England (as ambassador to Henry V of England), the Teutonic Knights, Poland, Lithuania, and Moscow, and was one of the negotiators of the Treaty of Troyes (1420). In 1421, he was sent by Henry V of England to Palestine to inquire into the possibility of reviving the Kingdom of Jerusalem, and wrote an account of his travels, Les Pelerinages de Surye et de Egipte, which was published in 1826 and again in 1842.

His travels in the Baltic region and Russia are recounted in his book Voyages et Ambassades, published in Mons in 1840 with subsequent editions. Around 1440, Lannoy wrote L'Instruction de josne prince ("Advice for a Young Prince"), which he dressed up with a fictional origin in the court of Norway "long, long ago", followed by a rediscovery of the manuscript text. The dedication miniature in Charles the Bold's copy of 1468–1470 illustrates the Norwegian story, but using up-to-date Burgundian costume and, it seems, the faces of the ducal family. Charles, around seven when the work was written, had no doubt always been the young prince Lannoy had in mind.

== See also ==
- List of foreign observers of Russia

== Sources ==
=== Primary sources ===
- de Lannoy, Guillebert (1840). Voyages et ambassades de messire Guillebert de Lannoy, 1399-1450. Mons: Hoyois.

=== Secondary sources ===
- "Ланнуа, Гильбер" . Brockhaus and Efron Encyclopedic Dictionary (in Russian). 1906.
- Kozulin, V. N. (2017). "Образ «Великой Руси» и русских в сочинении рыцаря Гильбера де Ланноа" [The Image of "Great Russia" and the Russians in the Work of Knight Guillebert de Lannoy]. Izvestiya of Altai State University (in Russian). 2. doi:10.14258/izvasu(2017)2-29.
- Kozulin, V. N. (15 December 2021). "Северные регионы России в описании фламандского рыцаря де Ланноа...: «немосковская» идентичность" [Northern Regions of Russia as Described by the Flemish Knight de Lannoy: "Non-Muscovite" Identity]. Izvestiya of Altai State University (in Russian). 122 (6): 67–72. doi:10.14258/izvasu(2021)6-10.
- Kren, Thomas; McKendrick, Scot, eds. (2003). Illuminating the Renaissance: The Triumph of Flemish Manuscript Painting in Europe. J. Paul Getty Museum. ISBN 978-0-89236-703-0.
- Mund, Stéphane (April 2002). "Travel Accounts as Early Sources of Knowledge about Russia in Medieval Western Europe from the mid-Thirteenth to the early Fifteenth Centuries". The Medieval History Journal. 5 (1): 103–120. doi:10.1177/097194580200500105.
