= Valentin de Lannoy =

Flemish military commander and Knight of the Golden Fleece

Valentin de Lannoy was a Flemish military commander and Knight of the Golden Fleece.

== Family ==
He was the younger son of Jacques de Lannoy, Lord of la Motterie and brother of Claude de Lannoy, 1st Count of la Motterie. He founded the Branch of the Lords of Leeuwerghem. He had 6 children, all born in Hulst.

== Career ==
In 1622 he was sent to military mission in Luxemburgh. He later was allowed membership of the military council and named governor of Hulst by Felipe IV of Spain in 1623. He resided in this city, together with his wife and children.
