= Jean de Lannoy =

Nobleman

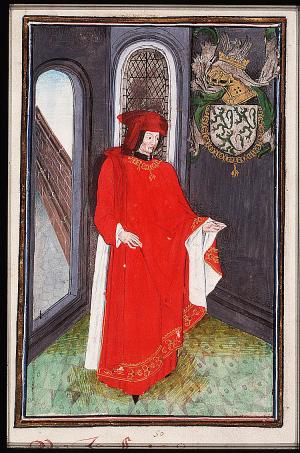
Jan of Lannoy as Knight in the Order of the Golden Fleece

Jean II de Lannoy or Jan van Lannoy (1410–1493), lord of Lannoy, Lys and Sébourg, was a nobleman from the County of Hainaut who played a prominent role in the politics of the Burgundian Netherlands.

== Life ==
Jean was a member of the noble de Lannoy family. He was the son of a Jean I de Lannoy who died in the Battle of Agincourt and of Jeanne de Croÿ, whose father, Jean I de Croÿ, also died at Agincourt.

As a young man, Lannoy had a military career, fighting against the Prince-Bishopric of Liège (1430), England (1436), Lorraine (1440) and the Electorate of Cologne (1447). In later life he wrote to his son that when called upon to speak in sessions of the council he could feel self-conscious about his lack of education.

In 1448 he was appointed by Philip the Good as stadtholder of the County of Holland and Zeeland, a function he held until 1462. He probably owed his appointment to his uncle, Antoine I de Croÿ. Between 1459 and 1463, he was also stadtholder of Walloon Flanders.

In 1451 he became a Knight in the Order of the Golden Fleece. In 1452–53 he participated in the suppression of the Revolt of Ghent (1449–1453).

He became an ally of the Dauphin, the future Louis XI, during his exile in the Burgundian domains (1456–1461), and helped him claim his throne in 1461. His closeness to the new king of France led to his deprivation from office in the Low Countries in 1462–1463, and in 1468 to open conflict with Duke Charles the Bold, who for a time forced him into exile.

In 1477 he served Maximilian I, Holy Roman Emperor as Chamberlain and conducted several diplomatic missions. In 1478 he negotiated with cities of Tournai and Cambrai, episcopal lordships of the Holy Roman Empire then under French protection. He played a very important role in negotiating the Treaty of Arras (1482).

He died on 18 March 1493.

== Sources ==
- Brown-Grant, Rosalind; Damen, Mario, eds. (2022). A Chivalric Life: The Book of the Deeds of Messire Jacques de Lalaing. The Boydell Press.
