= Grand Huntsman of Brabant =

Grand Veneur de Brabant or Grand Huntsman of Brabant was a feudal function at the court of the Duchy of Brabant.

== History ==
Like other functions at the court, this was an exclusive position for certain noble houses. In the 16th, 17th and 18th centuries the function was inherited by the Lords of Rubempré, and passed to the Merode family. Similar functions have been the Panetarius and Grand Falconer of Brabant, Grand Forester of Brabant and High Forester of Flanders.

== List ==
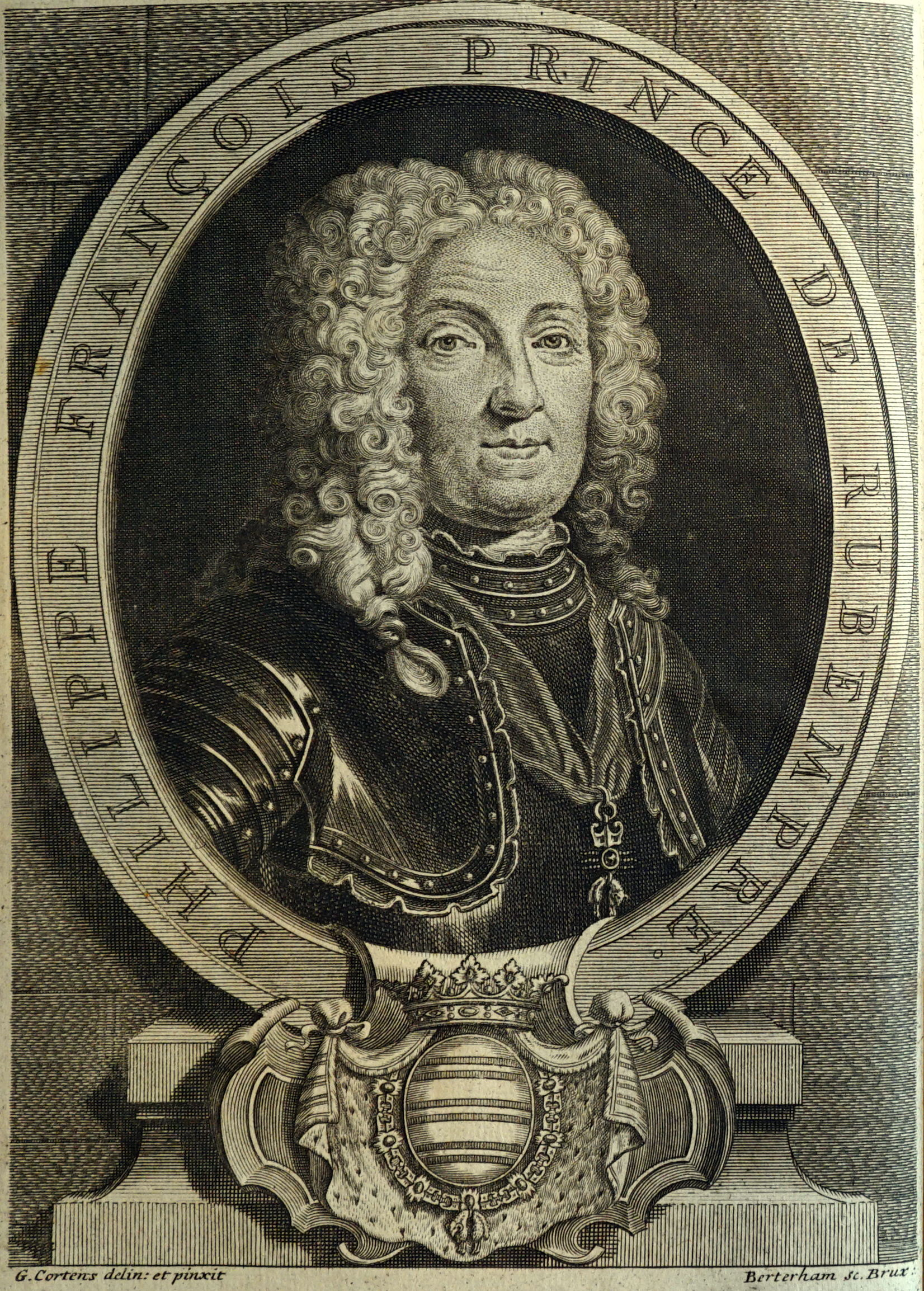
Philippe-François de Mérode, 2nd Prince of Rubempré

	Period	Name
1.	-1406	Guillaume, Count of Zeyn
2.	1406-	Guillaume de la Hove
3.	1416-1417	Arnoult vander Borcht
4.	1417-1430	Henry de Hertoghe
5.	1430-1431	Jacques, Lord of Sombreffe
6.	1431-1467	Jean Hinckaert
7.	1467-1472	Philippe Hinckaert, Viscount of Tervueren
8.	1472-1531	John III of Glymes
9.	1531-1538	Henry III of Nassau-Breda
10	1538-1540	Georges van Veltheim, Lord of Overische
11.	1540-	Philippe I de Lannoy, Lord of Molembais
12.	-1548	Adrian of Luxemburg-Ligny
13.	1556-1570	John IV of Glymes, 2nd Marquess of Berghes
14.	1570-1578	Charles, Count of Berlaymont
15.	1578-1581	Jean of Witthem, Baron of Bautersem
16.	1581-1581	Jean of Croy, Count of Rœulx
17.	1581-1599	Antoine III de Rubempré, Lord of Rubempré
18.	1599-1621	Philippe, Lord of Rubempré
19.	1621-1645	François of Rubempré, Count of Vertain
20.	1645-1707	Philippe, 1st Prince of Rubempré
21.	1707-1742	Philippe-François de Mérode, 2nd Prince of Rubempré
22.	1742-1744	Maximilien-Leopold de Mérode, 3rd Prince of Rubempré
23.	1744-1754	Maximilian Emanuel, 3rd Prince of Hornes
24.	1754-1773	Maximilien-Leopold de Mérode, 3rd Prince of Rubempré
25.	1774-	Otto d'Ongnies, Prince of Grimberghe (†1791)

== See also ==
- Broodmeester of Flanders
