= Claude de Lannoy, 1st Count of la Motterie =

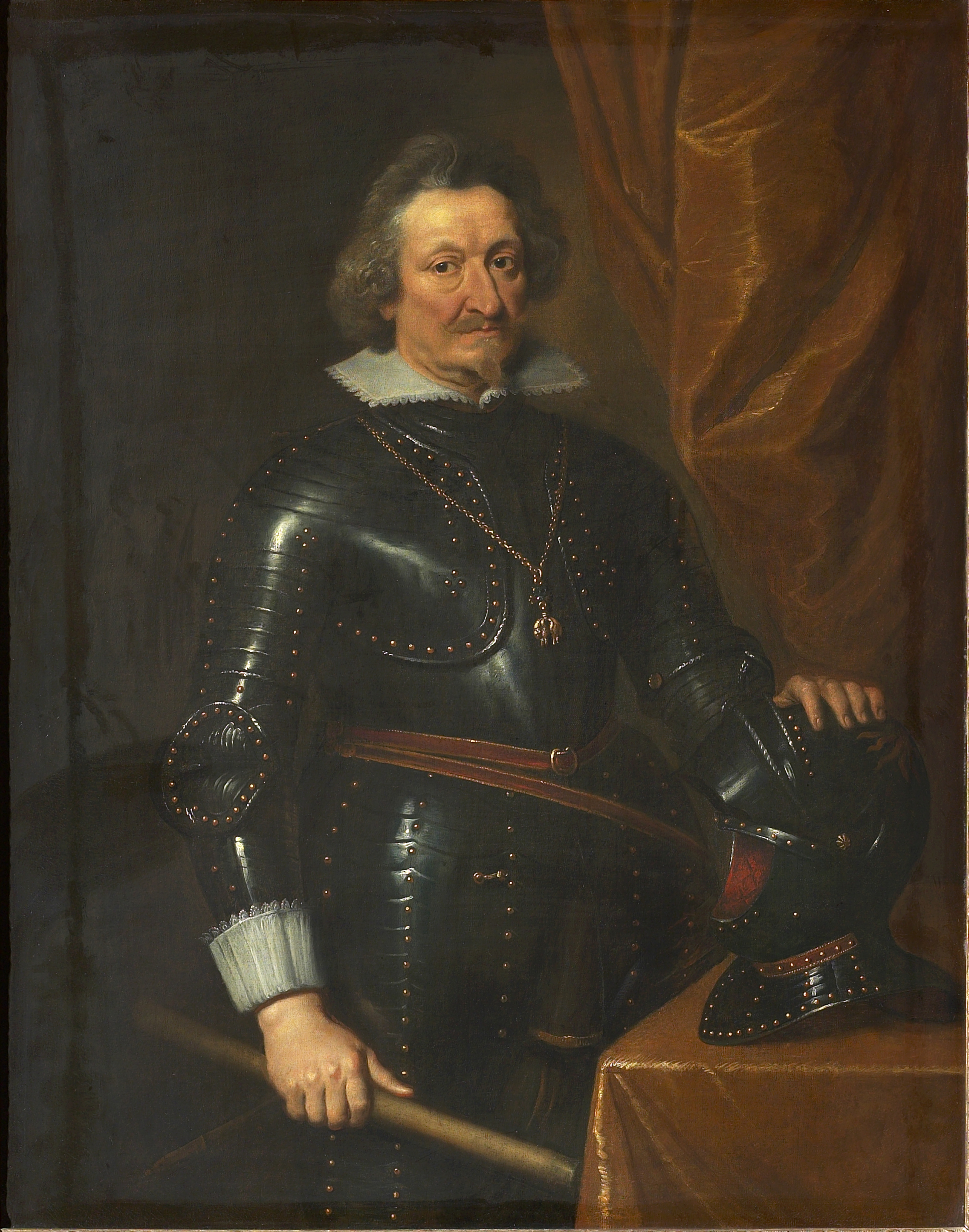

Claude de Lannoy (1578–1643), Comte de la Motterie, was a Flemish nobleman, Governor of Maastricht and Namur and a Knight of the Order of the Golden Fleece.

== Early life ==
Lannoy was born in 1578, the son of Jacques de Lannoy and Suzanne de Noyelles, into the illustrious de Lannoy family which included Charles de Lannoy and Anna van Egmont of the Seventeen Provinces. At the time, the provinces were in a state of upheaval and in 1581, the Dutch declared independence.

== Marriages and children ==
Lannoy first married Marie Françoise le Vasseur and they had a son; Philippe de Lannoy, 2nd Count of la Motterie who inherited his father's titles.

Upon the death of his first wife, Lannoy married Claudine d'Eltz, Baroness de Clervaux, and founded the Lannoy-Clervaux line which continued for several generations. They had two children; Albert de Lannoy, Baron de Clervaux (c. 1606) and Madeleine-Thérèse de Lannoy (c. 1608).

== Titles and military honours ==
Most references refer to him as the Comte de la Motterie; a title to which he was raised in 1628 by King Philip IV of Spain. A number also make reference to him as the Governor of Maastricht and the Governor of Namur.

There are references to Lannoy as the Camp Master General, serving in the Spanish army of Philip IV, though they give little details as to Lannoy's role or function and do not mention specific conflicts.

In 1638, Lannoy was made a Knight of the Order of the Golden Fleece.

Belgian nobility
Preceded by Jacques de Lannoy	1st Count of La Motterie	Succeeded by Philippe de Lannoy
