= Simon Rodriguez de Evora =

Flemish nobleman (born 1560)

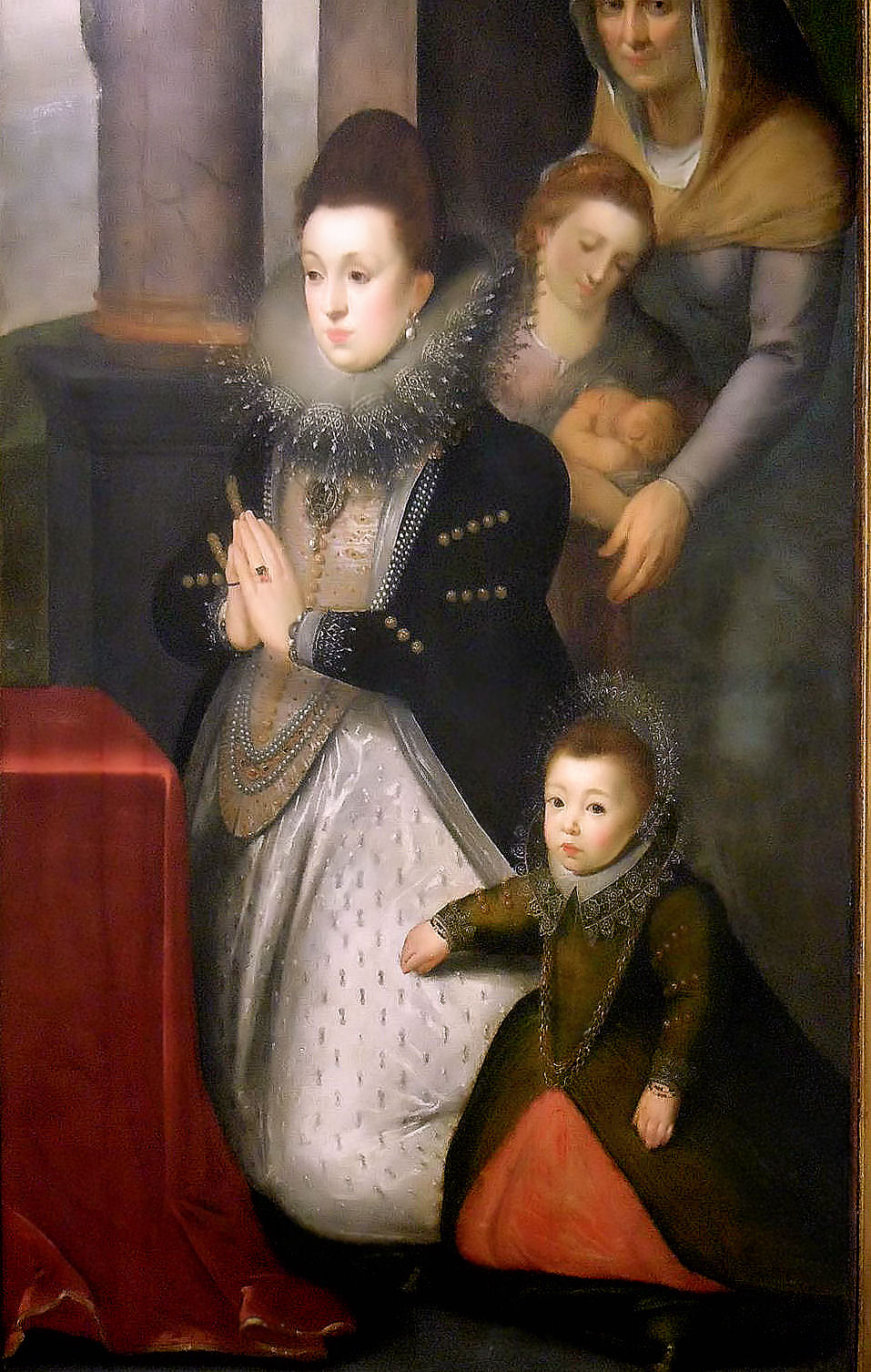
Anna Ximenes of Aragon and dona Gracia Rodriguez de Evora

Simon Rodriguez de Evora, 1st Baron of Rode (Antwerp, 1560-25 May 1618) was a Flemish nobleman.

== family ==
He is the son of Emmanuel (or Manuel) Rodriguez de Evora and Catharina Lopez de Elva.

He founded in 1601 Sint-Annagodshuis, in the bargiestraete in Antwerp. The next year he bought the Heerlijkheid of Rode. He is depicted in the De Aanbidding der Herders, painted in 1601 by Otto Venius. This triptiek currently is in the Collection of het Maagdenhuis Museum, Antwerp. In 1617 he was created Baron. He married Anna Ximenes of Aragon. His descendants form one of the major noble houses of Belgium.

They are buried in the Church of the Minderbroederklooster in Antwerp.

== Descendants. ==
- Dona Maria: marr Charles Rym, Lord of Bellem.
  - Maria Therese Rym: Marr. Jacques de Lalaing, viscount of Oudenaerde.
- Dona Gracia Rodriguez de Evora, died 1660: Lady of Melle, ter Zale and Rode married to Francisco de Vega, Order of Christ. She is painted as little girl on the triptych.
  - Lopez-Maria Rodriguez d'Evora y Vega, 1st Marquess of Rode. (1620-).
