= Belgian nobility =

Group of hereditary titles

The Belgian nobility comprises Belgian individuals or families recognized as noble with or without a title of nobility in the Kingdom of Belgium. The Belgian constitution states that no specific privileges are attached to the nobility.

== History ==
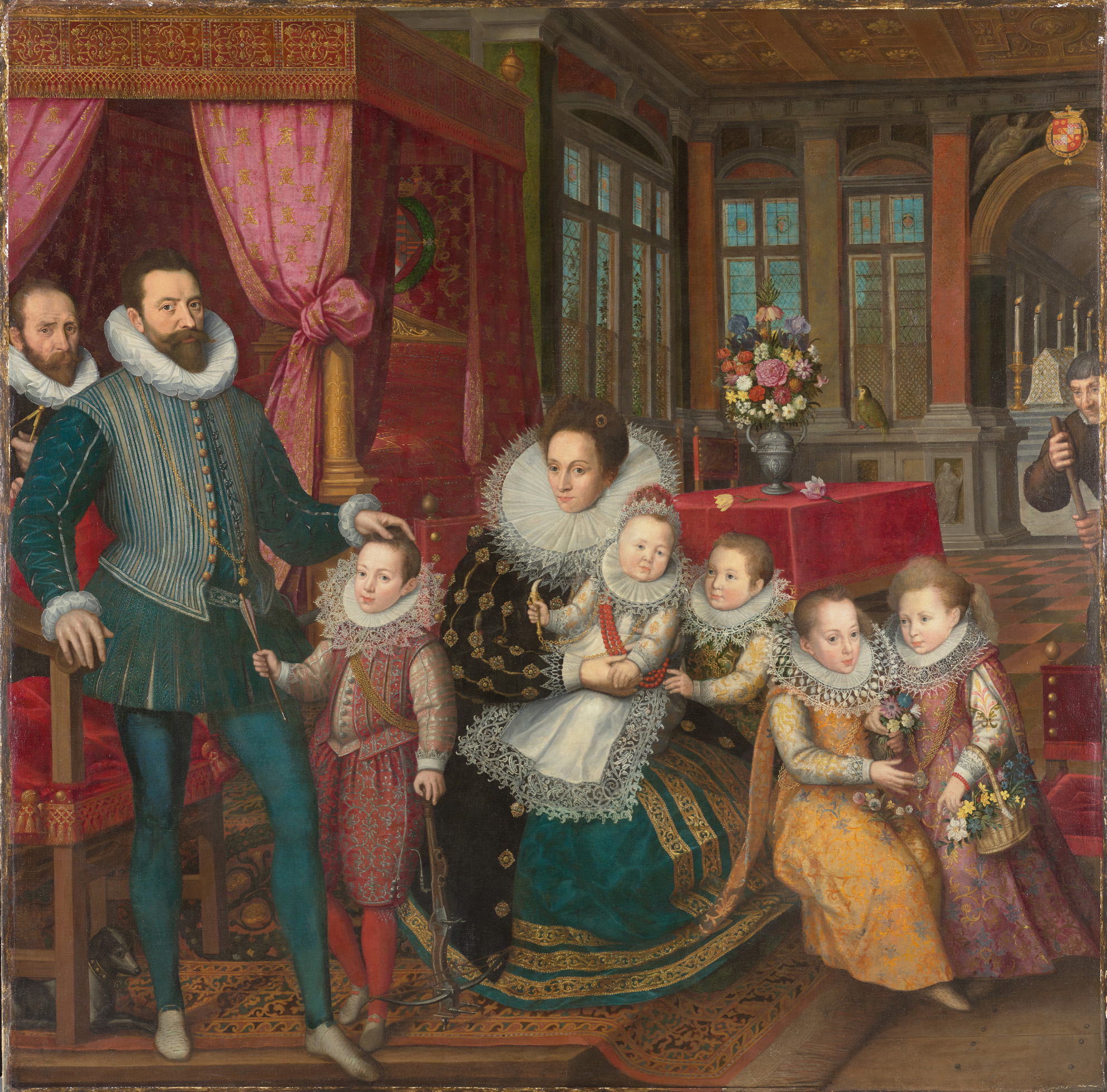
Portrait by Frans Pourbus the Younger, depicting the union of Charles of Arenberg and Anne of Croÿ, members of two of the most ancient and powerful houses among the Belgian nobility

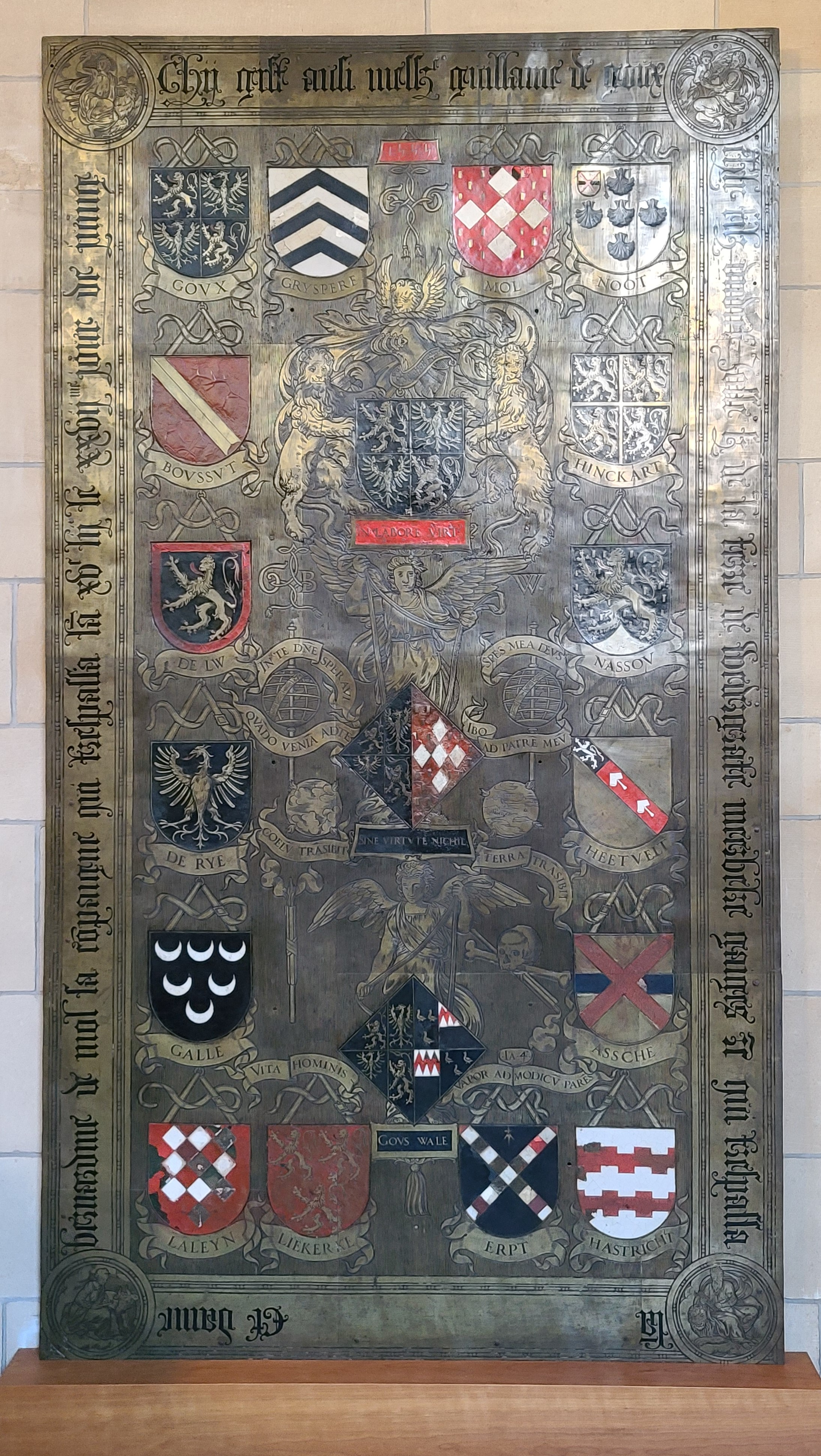
Coats of arms of Belgian nobility on the 1558 Wijnegem tomb plate of Guillaume de Goux and Bernardine de Mol

Because most old families have resided in the current territory of Belgium for centuries and prior to the founding of the modern Belgian state, their members have been drawn from a variety of nations. Spanish nobles resided in Flanders in the 15th and 16th centuries.

In the period under Dutch sovereignty, the nobility was an important factor in the move towards independence. After independence, the Kingdom of the Netherlands lost an important segment of their nobles, as all of the highest born families lived in the south, and thus became part of the Belgian nobility. At court in the 19th century, this new Belgian nobility played a major role.

During the Austrian period, the high nobility participated in the government, both political and at the imperial court of Brussels. Since the French Revolution the nobility has not played a social function. However some members of most old families worked in major functions in Belgium.

== The Belgian nobility today ==
In the Kingdom of Belgium there were as of 2013 approximately 1,300 noble families, with some 20,000 members. The noble lineage of only approximately 400 families dates back to the 17th century or earlier. As Belgium is a democratic constitutional monarchy there are no legal privileges attached to bearing a noble title or to being a member of the aristocracy. According to article 113 of the constitution, "The King may confer titles of nobility, without ever having the power to attach privileges to them".

Many nobles in Belgium still belong to the elite of society. They sometimes own and manage companies, or have leading positions in cultural society, business, banking, diplomacy, NGOs etc. Many of the older families still own (and reside in) important castles or country houses.

The fortune of the nobility is impressive: only 11% of the 500 wealthiest families in Belgium are members of the nobility, however: they have more than 56% of this wealth, 79.85 billion euros. This is partly caused by the fact that nowadays, many of the new noble titles are bestowed on wealthy entrepreneurs, like the families of Boël, Frere, Colruyt, Janssen and Solvay. Old houses however are in the minority and have sold much of their lands and estates. The house of Merode has sold during the ages thousands of hectares of their own private lands. Other houses have still immense lands and grounds, but most houses have lost much of their historic wealth.

== Ennoblement ==
Belgium is one of the few monarchies in the world in which hereditary ennoblement still occurs regularly. Hereditary titles are conferred by letters patent, which are issued by the King of the Belgians, co-signed by the minister of foreign affairs. Noble titles can also be granted for life.

Belgian citizens distinguished in business, politics, science, arts, sports, etc. or for extraordinary service to the kingdom may receive noble status or noble titles.

== Legal identity ==
In Belgium the title forms part of the identity of the noble person and is mentioned on the ID card. As it is a title, it is not a part of the name.

Every noble family has its own coat of arms and titles: both are legally protected by copyright. People who do not belong to the house are forbidden from using the titles or the coat of arms.

== Titles ==
The Belgian nobility is structured and ranked very formally. These ranks are still important in social life and ceremonial life at court.

=== Princes ===
The title of Prince (French: Prince, Dutch: Prins) is the highest noble title in use in Belgium. They are ranked under the princes of royal blood and members of the royal family.

Most members of the families listed below have the right to be referred to in Belgian government documents as "Prince" or "Princess" in combination with their family name.

- Prince de Habsbourg-Lorraine, Archdukes Rudolf (1950) and Carl Christian of Austria (1954), and their legitimate male-line descendants, were incorporated into Belgium's nobility as Prince/sse de Habsbourg-Lorraine in 1978 and 1983, respectively.
- Prince of Ligne, Imperial Count 1549, Imperial prince 1601, mediatized 1803, 1923 Belgian recognition of title Prince d'Amblise et d'Epinoy by male primogeniture.
- Prince of Lobkowicz, mediatized family of Bohemia whose 1624 Imperial princely title was recognized in Belgium for a member of the family who became a Belgian subject.
- Prince de Mérode, Imperial Count since 1622; Heads of the house bore the titles Marquis of Westerlo since 1626 and Prince of Rubempré and Everberg since the 18th century, title of Prince of Grimbergen inherited by primogeniture from Marie-Josephe de Mastaing-Oignies in 1842; each member is prince/sse de Merode since 1929. Famous is prince Emmanuel de Merode, director of the Virunga National Park.
- Riquet, Prince de Chimay in 1824 and Prince de Caraman 1856 by primogeniture; uniquely, since 1889 each male bears the title Prince de Caraman Chimay, while each female born in the family is a countess.
- Prince of Waterloo, since 8 July 1815, given as a victory title to the head of the Wellesley family, the Duke of Wellington.
- Prince of Swiatopelk-Czetwertyński, princely titles given Alexandre Czetwertynski and Tinko Czetwertynski — recognised in 2007.

=== Dukes ===
The title of Duke/Duchess of Brabant (fr: Duc(hesse) de Brabant, nl: Hertog(in) van Brabant, de: Herzog(in) von Brabant) is reserved for the heir apparent to the Belgian monarchy (and in the absence of an heir apparent, the title reverts to the Crown). Current titleholder is Princess Elisabeth.

Members of the following houses bear the title of Duke (French: Duc, Dutch: Hertog). The ducal title has never been granted outside the royal family in the Kingdom of Belgium. The origin of such titles for Belgian families thus pre-dates the current monarchy, having been conferred or recognised by sovereigns of other jurisdictions.

- Duke of Arenberg, princely Imperial count 1576, Imperial duke 1644, sovereign 1803–1811, mediatised; although all family members, male and female, are both duke and prince, Belgian recognition of "prince" for all members 1953, Belgian duke by primogeniture, 1994
- Duke of Beaufort-Spontin, 1746 Austrian Netherlands title of marquis with rank of prince by primogeniture, duke in 1782 and 1876, Imperial Count 1789; family members are Count/ess de Beaufort-Spontin, Head of the House is Duke
- Duke of Croÿ, Imperial prince 1486, 1594 and 1664, French duke 1598 and 1768; each member is prince/sse de Croÿ, while the head is also the Duke
- Duke of Looz-Corswarem et de Corswarem-Looz, 1734 Austrian Netherlands dukedom; mediatised, other members of this ducal branch are prince/sse; members of a second branch are count/ess of Looz-Corswarem; members of a third branch are écuyer de Corswarem
- Duke of Ursel, Imperial Count 1638. Only the head of this family is Duke; any other member is count/ess.

=== Marquesses ===
Members of twelve families bear today the title of marquess. These titles have origins prior to the French Revolution and used to be connected to physical marquisates. In most of these families, the title descends by male primogeniture.

=== Counts ===
The titles Count of Hainault and Count of Flanders, historically associated with major provinces of what is now Belgium, are used as dynastic titles for members of the Belgian royal family.

Count is the highest-ranked title still granted by the Belgian monarch. There are approximately 90 families in Belgium where at least one of the members bears the title of count or countess.

=== Viscounts ===
There are approximately 45 families in Belgium where at least one of the members bears the title of Viscount.

=== Barons ===
Around 300 individuals bear the title of Baron or Baroness. The title may descend either by masculine primogeniture or to all legitimate descendants in the male-line of the original title-holder.

=== Knights ===
In Belgium there are roughly 200 knights (French: chevalier, Dutch: Ridder). The title has no female equivalent.

=== Écuyer, Jonkheer/Jonkvrouw ===
Écuyer, Jonkheer (Dutch, originally meaning "young lord") is the lowest Belgian title recognised by law. Many cadet members of important houses are styled with this title, this happens when the head of the family is styled higher.

== Foreign titles in Belgium ==
Foreign titles granted to Belgians are not recognised and have no value in Belgium. The port by a Belgian citizen of a foreign title is punishable under article 230 of the Penal Code.

However, a person of foreign nationality who officially belongs to the nobility of his country may bear his foreign title in Belgium if it appears in the official documents establishing his identity, issued by the competent authorities of his country. When he becomes a Belgian citizen by naturalization, he loses his nobiliary status of his country of origin and therefore no longer has the right to bear his foreign title. If foreign titles are recognized, the bearers are incorporated into the Belgian nobility (see above for some Polish and Bohemian princes, two Austrian archdukes).
