= Wedding of Guillaume, Hereditary Grand Duke of Luxembourg, and Countess Stéphanie de Lannoy =

2012 Luxembourgish royal wedding

- Guillaume and Stephanie's dual cypher

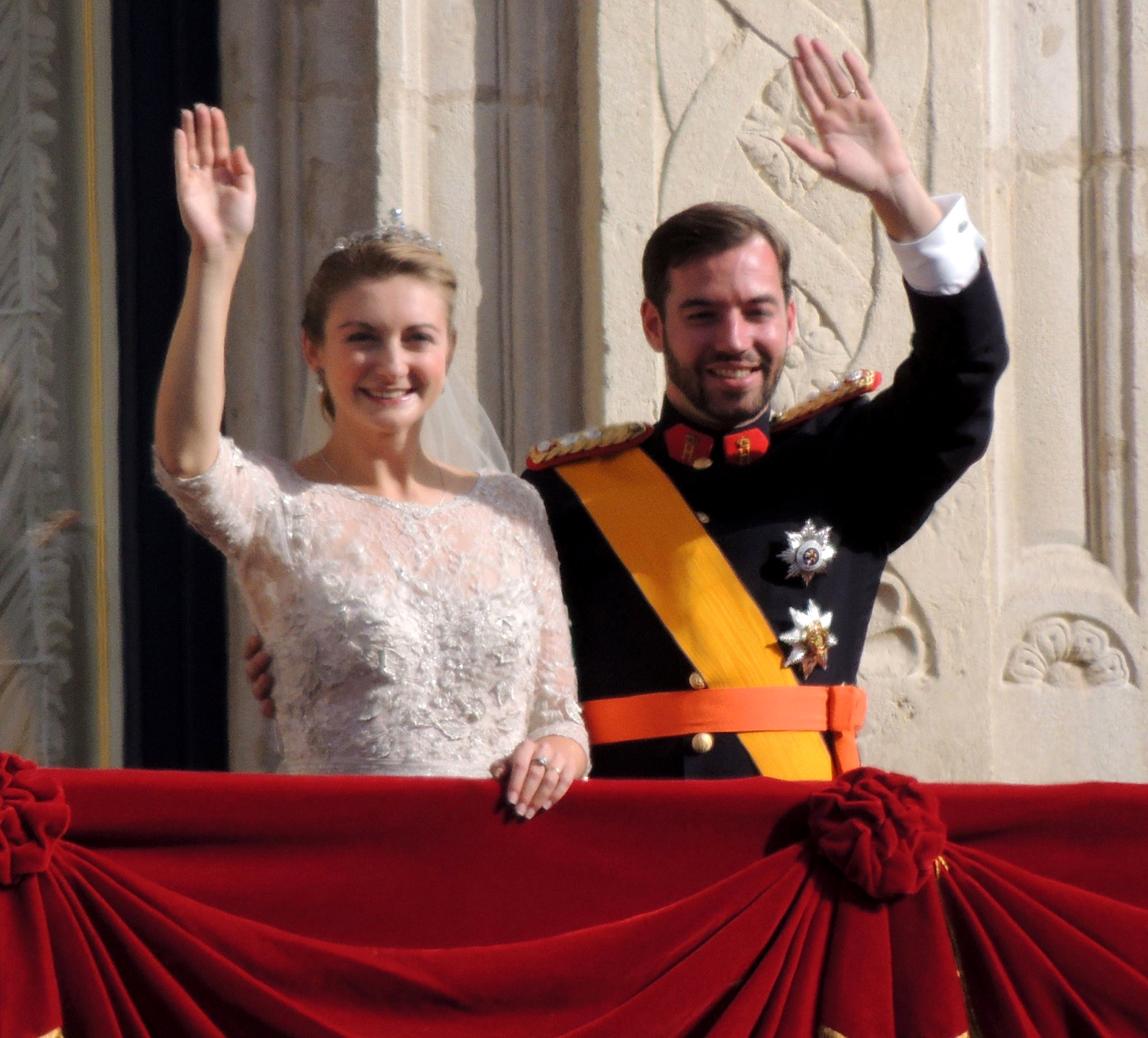
- Guillaume and Stéphanie on their wedding day
- Date: 19 October 2012 (civil ceremony); 20 October 2012 (religious ceremony)
- Location: Notre-Dame Cathedral
- Participants: Guillaume, Hereditary Grand Duke of Luxembourg & Countess Stephanie de Lannoy

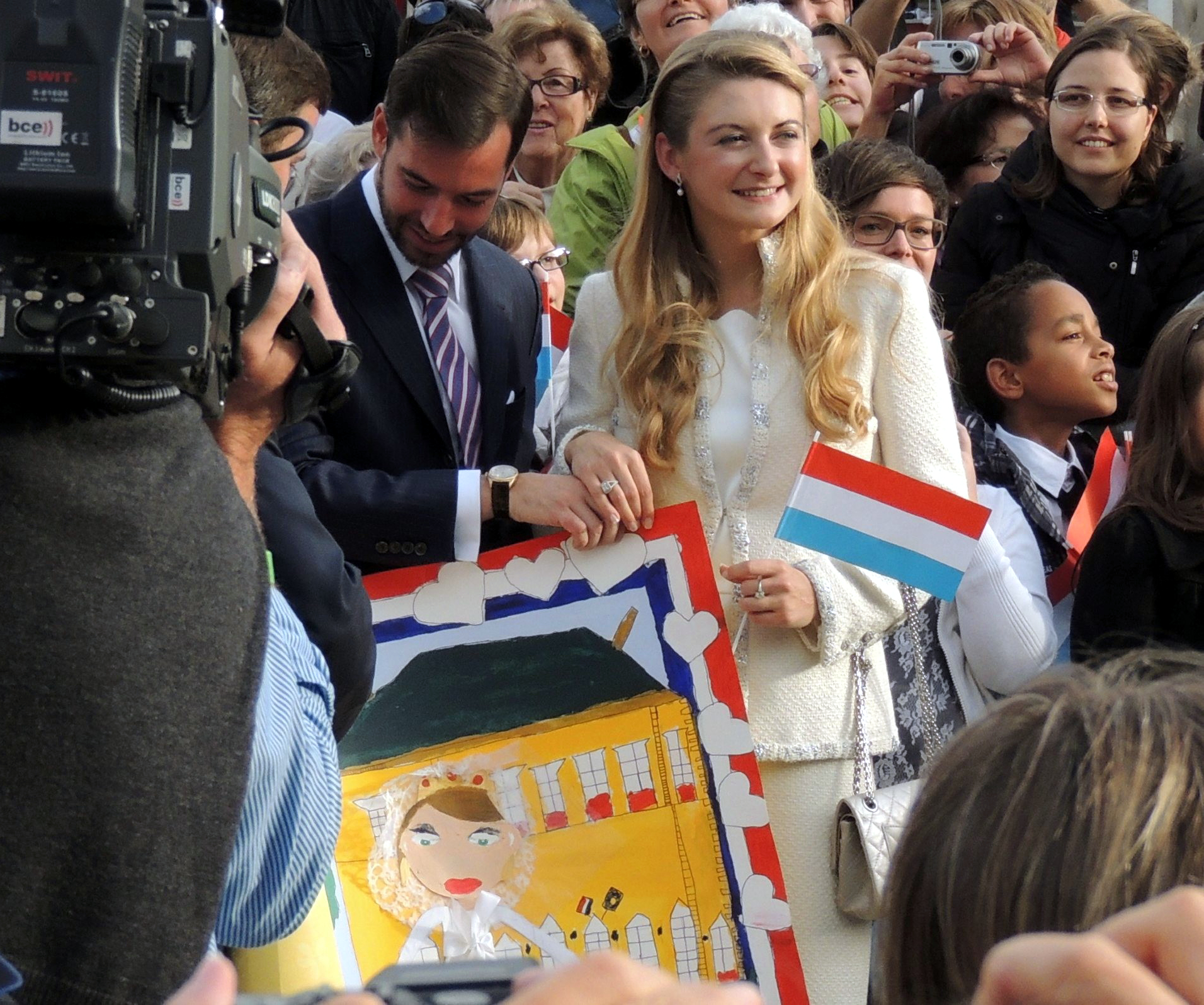
The couple after their civil wedding, receiving children's paintings.

The wedding of Guillaume, Hereditary Grand Duke of Luxembourg, and Countess Stéphanie de Lannoy took place on 19 and 20 October 2012. A civil ceremony was held on 19 October followed by a Roman Catholic wedding ceremony at Notre-Dame Cathedral in Luxembourg City the next day. The 2012 wedding marked the largest event for the Grand Ducal Family of Luxembourg and the country in years. More than 120 international media organisations requested accreditation for the event, including TV channels and newspapers from China, Morocco, Russia and the US. Guillaume was the last unmarried heir apparent of a monarchy in Europe prior to the wedding.

== Background ==
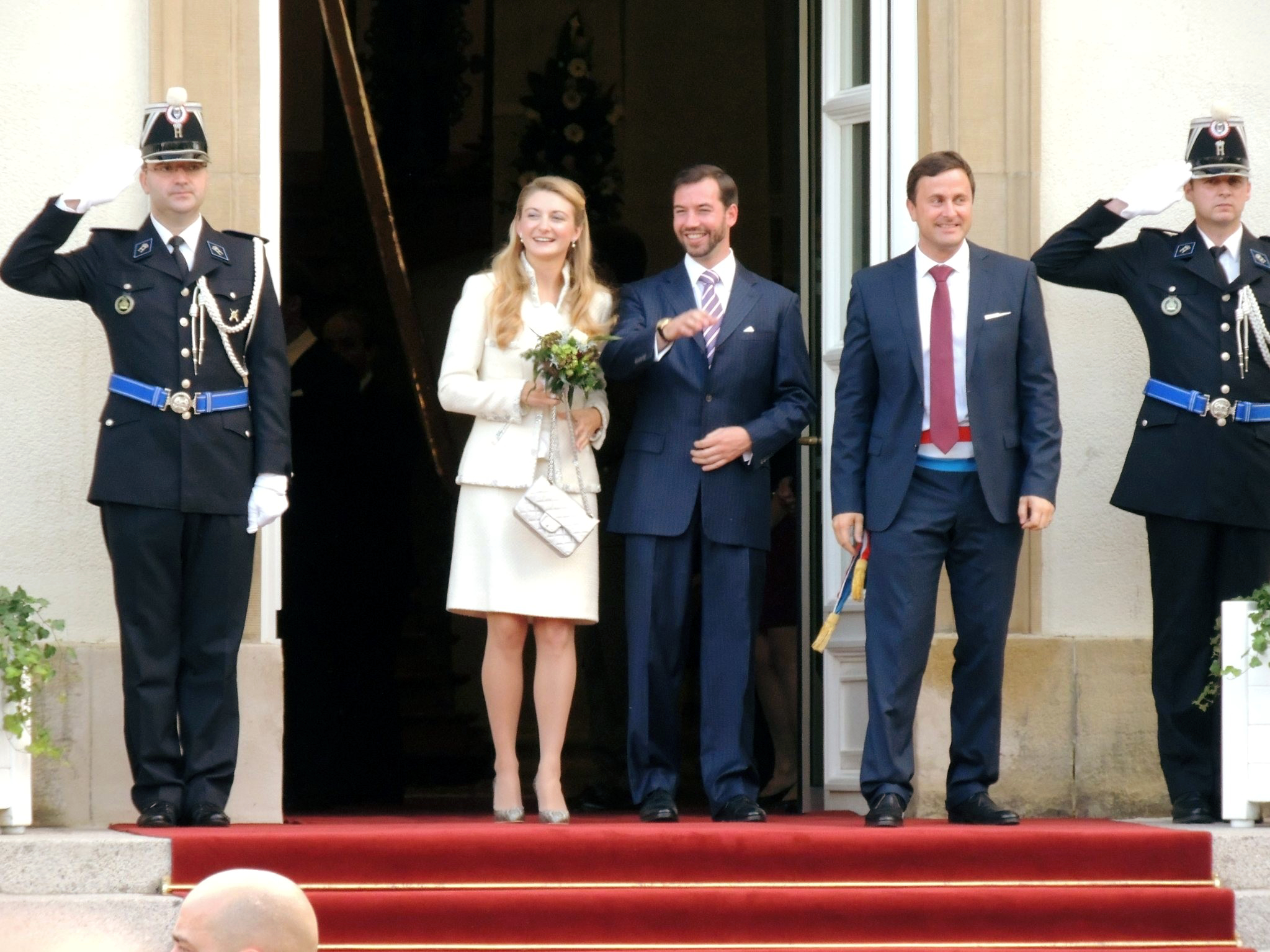
The couple exiting the Town Hall after the civil ceremony; r.: the mayor of Luxembourg City, X. Bettel.

The House of Nassau-Weilburg, which includes the Grand Ducal Family, has headed Luxembourg since 1890. Hereditary Grand Duke Guillaume is the heir apparent of his father, Grand Duke Henri.

Stéphanie de Lannoy is a member of a Belgian noble family, considered one of the oldest aristocratic families in Europe.

Guillaume and Stéphanie had known each other for many years. The couple began dating in 2009. They announced their engagement in April 2012. Prince Guillaume was 30 years old and Stéphanie was 28 years old at the time of their wedding.

Stéphanie's mother, Alix de Lannoy, died from a stroke on 26 August 2012, just two months before the grand ducal wedding.

The 2012 grand ducal wedding is estimated to have cost approximately €500,000 (US$650,000), paid with Luxembourgish taxes. The two-day ceremony included public street fairs, fireworks, and free concerts, all open to the public.

Stephanie's change of citizenship was expedited prior to the wedding, which caused some controversy within Luxembourg. She became a naturalized Luxembourger 19 October 2012.

The wedding is mentioned in the Epstein files, where one of the guests, Mette-Marit, Crown Princess of Norway, writes to Jeffrey Epstein that she is "dying of boredom" from the wedding and asks him to "come save us." The comment was widely reported on in the scandal over the relationship of Mette-Marit and Epstein.

== Ceremony ==
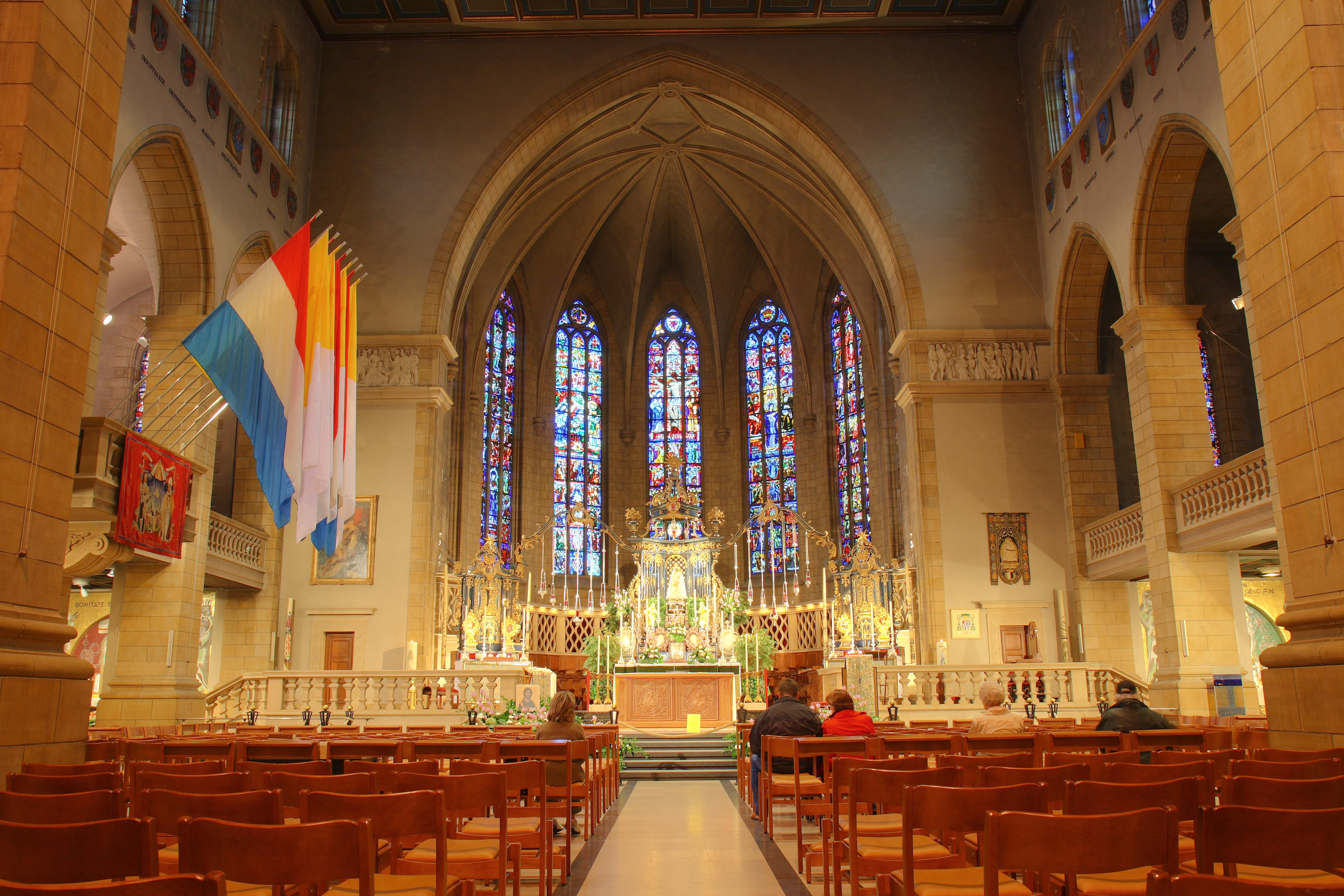
Interior of Notre-Dame Cathedral.

=== Civil ceremony ===
Prince Guillaume and Countess Stéphanie were married in a small civil ceremony on 19 October 2012, conducted by Luxembourg Mayor Xavier Bettel.

A white tie gala dinner was held that evening at the Grand Ducal Palace.

=== Religious ceremony ===
The more elaborate, Catholic wedding ceremony was held in Notre-Dame Cathedral the next day. The ceremony, which began shortly after 11:00 a.m. on 20 October, was officiated by Archbishop Jean-Claude Hollerich of the Roman Catholic Archdiocese of Luxembourg. The weather on the day of the ceremony was described as "unseasonably warm." Stéphanie was escorted into the Cathedral by her eldest brother, Count Jehan. Hereditary Grand Duke Guillaume arrived at the ceremony with his mother, Grand Duchess Maria Teresa of Luxembourg.

The bride and groom exchanged wedding rings crafted entirely from fair trade gold.

The couple exchanged a public kiss before a crowd of well-wishers on the balcony of the Grand Ducal Palace after the ceremony.

=== Wedding attire ===
Countess Stéphanie's wedding dress was designed by Lebanese fashion designer Elie Saab. The dress was described as an "ivory lace dress embroidered with silver filigree" with "three-quarter length sleeves." Her dress was accompanied by a silk tulle veil, featuring a motif of silver floral designs trailing thirteen feet behind her and the Lannoy family tiara.

Prince Guillaume wore a Luxembourgish military uniform.

=== Bridal attendants ===
The bridal attendants were the bridegroom's sister, nephew, and nieces and nephew of the bride:

- Princess Alexandra of Luxembourg
- Antonia Hamilton
- Prince Gabriel of Nassau
- Countess Caroline de Lannoy
- Countess Louise de Lannoy
- Isaure de le Court
- Lancelot de le Court
- Madeleine Hamilton

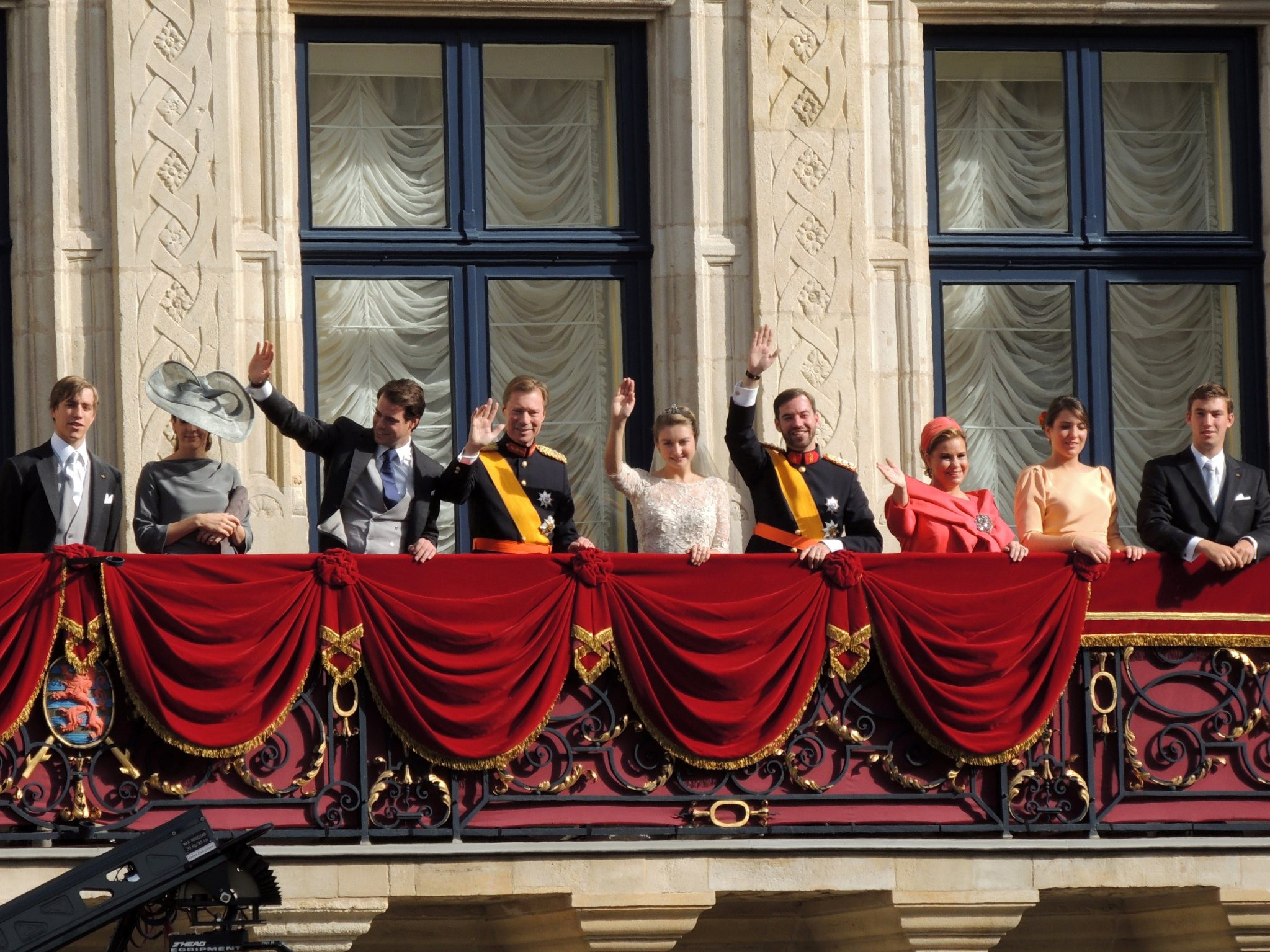
The couple amidst the grand ducal family after the religious ceremony.

== Guests ==
=== Relatives of the groom ===
==== Grand Ducal Family of Luxembourg ====
- Grand Duke Jean, the groom's paternal grandfather
  - The Grand Duke and Grand Duchess, the groom's parents
    - Prince Félix and Claire Lademacher, the groom's brother and his girlfriend
    - Prince Louis and Princess Tessy, the groom's brother and sister-in-law
      - Prince Gabriel of Nassau, the groom's nephew
      - Prince Noah of Nassau, the groom's nephew
    - Princess Alexandra, the groom's sister
    - Prince Sébastien, the groom's brother
  - Archduchess Marie-Astrid and Archduke Carl Christian of Austria, the groom's paternal aunt and uncle
    - Archduchess Marie Christine and Count Rodolphe of Limburg-Stirum, the groom's first cousin and her husband
    - Archduke Imre and Archduchess Kathleen of Austria, the groom's first cousin and his wife
    - Archduke Cristoph of Austria and Adélaïde Drapé-Frisch, the groom's first cousin and his fiancée
    - Archduke Alexander of Austria, the groom's first cousin
    - Archduchess Gabriella of Austria, the groom's first cousin
  - Prince Jean and Countess Diane of Nassau, the paternal uncle and aunt
    - Princess Marie-Gabrielle of Nassau, the groom's first cousin
    - Prince Constantin of Nassau, the groom's first cousin
    - Prince Wenceslas of Nassau, the groom's first cousin
    - Prince Carl-Johan of Nassau, the groom's first cousin
  - Princess Margaretha and Prince Nikolaus of Liechtenstein, the groom's paternal aunt and uncle
    - Princess Maria-Anunciata of Liechtenstein, the groom's first cousin
    - Princess Marie-Astrid of Liechtenstein, the groom's first cousin
    - Prince Josef-Emanuel of Liechtenstein, the groom's first cousin
  - Prince Guillaume and Princess Sibilla, the groom's paternal uncle and aunt
    - Prince Paul Louis of Nassau, the groom's first cousin
    - Prince Léopold of Nassau, the groom's first cousin
    - Princess Charlotte of Nassau, the groom's first cousin
    - Prince Jean of Nassau, the groom's first cousin

==== Extended family ====
- Descendants of Princess Elisabeth, Duchess of Hohenberg, the groom's paternal grandaunt:
  - Princess Anna of Hohenberg and Count Andreas of Bardeau, the groom's first cousin once removed, and her husband
  - Princess Sophie of Hohenberg and Jean-Louis de Potesta, the groom's first cousin once removed, and her husband
- Descendants of Princess Marie-Adélaïde, Countess Henckel von Donnersmarck, the groom's paternal grandaunt:
  - Countess Charlotte Henckel and Count Christoph Johannes von Meran, the groom's first cousin once removed, and her husband
- Descendants of Princess Marie Gabriele, Dowager Countess of Holstein-Ledreborg, the groom's paternal grandaunt:
  - Countess Lydia of Holstein-Ledreborg, the groom's first cousin once removed
  - Countess Veronica of Holstein-Ledreborg, the groom's first cousin once removed
  - Countess Silvia of Holstein-Ledreborg and John Munro, the groom's first cousin once removed, and her husband
  - Countess Antonia of Holstein-Ledreborg, the groom's first cousin once removed
- Descendants of Prince Charles of Luxembourg, the groom's paternal granduncle
  - Princess Charlotte and Marc-Victor Cunningham, the groom's first cousin once removed, and her husband
  - Prince Robert and Princess Julie, the groom's first cousin once removed, and his wife
- The Dowager Princess of Ligne, the groom's paternal grandaunt
  - The Prince and Princess of Ligne, the groom's first cousin once removed, and his wife
    - Princess Alix de Ligne, the groom's second cousin
  - Prince and Princess Wauthier de Ligne, the groom's first cousin once removed, and his wife
    - Princess Elisabeth-Eleonore and Baron Baudouin Gillès de Pelichy, the groom's second cousin and her husband
  - Princess Anne and Charles de Fabribeckers de Cortils et Grâce, the groom's first cousin once removed, and his wife
  - Princess Christine and Prince Antônio of Orléans-Braganza, the groom's first cousin once removed, and her husband
  - Princess Sophie, Countess Philippe de Nicolay, the groom's first cousin once removed
  - Prince and Princess Antoine-Lamoral de Ligne, the groom's first cousin once removed, and his wife
  - Princess Yolande and Hugo Townshend, the groom's first cousin once removed, and her husband
- Hélène Vestur, former wife of Prince Jean

==== Mestre family ====
- Luis and Nicole Mestre, the groom's maternal uncle and aunt
  - Maike Mestre, the groom's first cousin
  - Luis Mestre, the groom's cousin
- Antonio Mestre, the groom's maternal uncle
- Catalina Esteve, the groom's maternal aunt
  - Natalia Esteve, the groom's cousin
  - Katarina Esteve, the groom's cousin
  - Victoria Esteve, the groom's cousin

=== Relatives of the bride ===
==== de Lannoy family ====
- The Count de Lannoy, the bride's father
  - Count Jehan de Lannoy, the bride's brother
    - Countess Caroline de Lannoy, the bride's niece
    - Countess Louise de Lannoy, the bride's niece
  - Count Christian and Countess Luisa de Lannoy, the bride's brother and sister-in-law
  - Countess Nathalie and John Hamilton, the bride's sister and brother-in-law
    - Antonia Hamilton, the bride's niece
    - Charlotte Hamilton, the bride's niece
    - Madeleine Hamilton, the bride's niece
  - Countess Gaëlle de Lannoy, the bride's sister
  - Count Amaury de Lannoy, the bride's brother
  - Count Olivier and Countess Alice de Lannoy, the bride's brother and sister-in-law
  - Countess Isabelle and Jean-Charles de le Court, the bride's sister and brother-in-law
    - Isaure de le Court, the bride's niece
    - Lancelot de le Court, the bride's nephew
- Countess Chantal de Lannoy, the bride's paternal aunt
  - Countess Christine and Count Bruno de Limburg Stirum, the bride's first cousin and her husband
- Countess Isabelle de Lannoy, the bride's paternal aunt
- Count Claude and Countess Claudine de Lannoy, the bride's paternal uncle and aunt

==== della Faille de Leverghem family ====
- Ladislas and Anne della Faille de Leverghem, the bride's maternal uncle and aunt
- Lydia and Sir Dominique de Schaetzen, the bride's maternal aunt and uncle
- Dominique and Claude della Faille de Lerverghem, the bride's maternal uncle and aunt
- Arnaud and Marie-Pascale della Faille de Lerverghem, the bride's maternal uncle and aunt

=== Foreign royal guests ===
==== Members of reigning royal families ====
- The King and Queen of the Belgians, the groom's paternal granduncle and grandaunt
  - (Belgium) The Duke and Duchess of Brabant, the groom's first cousin once removed, and his wife
  - The Archduchess and Archduke of Austria-Este, the groom's first cousin once removed, and second cousin, once removed
    - Prince Amedeo of Belgium, the groom's second cousin
  - Prince Laurent and Princess Claire of Belgium, the groom's first cousin once removed, and his wife
- Queen Fabiola of Belgium, the groom's paternal grandaunt by marriage
- The Queen and Prince Consort of Denmark, the groom's second cousin twice removed, and her husband
  - The Crown Prince and Crown Princess of Denmark, the groom's third cousin once removed, and his wife
- (Denmark) Count Axel and Countess Jutta of Rosenborg, the groom's second cousin once removed, and his wife
- The Crown Prince of Japan (representing the Emperor of Japan)
- Prince Hassan bin Talal and Princess Sarvath al-Hassan of Jordan (representing the King of Jordan)
  - Prince Rashid bin Hassan and Princess Zeina al-Rashid of Jordan
- The Prince and Princess of Liechtenstein, the groom's third cousin once removed, and his wife
- Princess Isabelle of Liechtenstein, wife of the groom's third cousin once removed
  - Prince Wenzeslaus of Liechtenstein, the groom's fourth cousin
- (Liechtenstein) The Dowager Marchioness of Mariño, the groom's third cousin once removed
- The Princess of Hanover, wife of the groom's third cousin twice removed (representing the Prince of Monaco)
- The Princess Consort of Morocco (representing the King of Morocco)
- The Queen of the Netherlands, the groom's fourth cousin once removed
  - The Prince of Orange and Princess Máxima of the Netherlands, the groom's fifth cousin and his wife
- The King and Queen of Norway, the groom's first cousin twice removed, and his wife
  - The Crown Prince and Crown Princess of Norway, the groom's second cousin once removed, and his wife
  - Princess Märtha Louise of Norway, the groom's second cousin once removed
- Sheikha Al-Mayassa bint Hamad bin Khalifa Al-Thani of Qatar (representing the Emir of Qatar)
- Sheikh Hamad bin Jassim bin Jaber Al Thani (representing of Emir of Qatar)
- The Prince and Princess of Asturias, the groom's fourth cousin once removed, and his wife (representing the King of Spain)
- The Queen of Sweden, wife of the groom's third cousin once removed (representing the King of Sweden)
  - The Crown Princess of Sweden and the Duke of Västergötland, the groom's fourth cousin and her husband
  - (Sweden) The Duke of Värmland, the groom's fourth cousin
- The Sheikh Nahyan bin Mubarak Al Nahyan, Minister of Higher Education (representing of Emir of Abu Dhabi and President of United Arab Emirates)
- The Earl and Countess of Wessex, the groom's third cousin twice removed, and his wife (representing the Queen of the United Kingdom)

==== Members of non-reigning royal families ====
- Archduchess Maria Beatrice, Countess Riprand von und zu Arco-Zinneberg, the groom's second cousin once removed
  - Countess Anna von und zu Arco-Zinneberg, the groom's third cousin
  - Countess Olympia von und zu Arco-Zinneberg, the groom's third cousin
- Archduke Martin and Archduchess Katharina of Austria-Este, the groom's second cousin once removed, and his wife
- Archduchess Isabella and Count Andrea Czarnocki-Lucheschi, the groom's second cousin once removed, and her husband
- Archduke István and Archduchess Paola of Austria, the groom's second cousin once removed, and his wife
- Archduchess Yolande of Austria, widow of the groom's first cousin twice removed
  - Archduke Rudolf and Archduchess Marie-Hélène of Austria, the groom's second cousin once removed
    - Archduchess Priscilla of Austria, the groom's third cousin
- Archduchess Anna Gabriele of Austria, widow of the groom's first cousin twice removed
  - Archduchess Maria Anna and Prince Peter Galitzine, the groom's second cousin once removed, and her husband
  - Archduke Karl Peter and Archduchess Alexandra of Austria, the groom's second cousin once removed, and his wife
  - Archduke Simeon and Archduchess María of Austria, the groom's second cousin once removed, and his wife
  - Archduchess Catharina-Maria of Austria and Count Massimiliano Secco d'Aragona, the groom's second cousin once removed, and her husband
- Archduke Michael and Archduchess Christiana of Austria, the groom's fourth cousin once removed, and his wife
- Archduchess Sophie and The Prince of Windisch-Graetz, the groom's fourth cousin once removed, and her husband
- The Margrave and Margravine of Baden, the groom's third cousins twice removed
  - The Hereditary Prince and Hereditary Princess of Baden, the groom's fourth cousin once removed, and his wife
- The Duke and Duchess in Bavaria, the groom's second cousin twice removed, and his wife
- Prince Ludwig of Bavaria, the groom's third cousin
- The Dowager Duchess of Croÿ, the groom's first cousin twice removed
  - The Duke and Duchess of Croÿ, the groom's second cousin once removed, and his wife
- The Hereditary Duke and Hereditary Duchess of Parma, the groom's second cousin once removed, and his wife
- Princess Marie Françoise of Parma, the groom's first cousin twice removed
  - Prince Charles-Henri de Lobkowicz, the groom's second cousin once removed
- Tsar Simeon II and Tsarina Margarita of the Bulgarians, the groom's half-second cousin once removed, and his wife
  - The Princess of Turnovo, wife of the groom's half-third cousin
  - The Prince of Preslav, the groom's half-third cousin
- The Duke and Duchess of Vendôme, the groom's fourth cousin and his wife
- The Prince Napoléon, the groom's fourth cousin once removed
- King Constantine II and Queen Anne-Marie of Greece, the groom's third cousin twice removed, and second cousin twice removed
  - Crown Prince Pavlos and Crown Princess Marie-Chantal of Greece, the groom's third cousin once removed, and his wife
- The Prince and Princess of Venice, the groom's second cousin once removed, and his wife
- The Princess and Prince of Löwenstein-Wertheim-Rosenberg, the groom's fifth cousin twice removed, and her husband
- The Duke and Duchess of Braganza, the groom's second cousin twice removed, and his wife
- The Prince of Prussia, the groom's sixth cousin, once removed
- Princess Alexandra and Count Jefferson von Pfeil und Klein-Ellguth, the groom's third cousin once removed, and her husband
- The Prince and Princess of Sayn-Wittgenstein-Sayn
- Crown Princess Margareta and Prince Radu of Romania, the groom's second cousin once removed, and her husband
- The Princess of Waldburg zu Zeil und Trauchburg
- Crown Prince Alexander of Serbia and Crown Princess Katherine, the groom's fourth cousin once removed, and his wife

=== Nobility ===
- Princess Dainé d'Arenberg
- (United Kingdom) The Lady Brabourne
  - (United Kingdom) The Hon. Alexandra Knatchbull
- (Belgium) The Prince and Princess de Mérode
  - (Belgium) Princess Blanche and Baron Philipp von und zu Bodman
- The Prince and Princess of Stolberg-Stolberg
- Princess Louise of Stolberg-Stolberg

=== Other notable guests ===
- Jean-Claude Juncker, Prime Minister of Luxembourg
- Xavier Bettel, Mayor of Luxembourg City, and his partner Gauthier Destenay
- (European Union) José Manuel Barroso, President of the European Commission

Approximately 270 citizens of the Grand Duchy of Luxembourg attended the wedding ceremony.
