= Philippe de Lannoy =

Belgian nobleman and Provincial Councillor (1922–2019)

- Count de Lannoy
- Full name: Philippe Marie Ernest Albert de Lannoy
- Born: 14 August 1922; Brussels, Kingdom of Belgium
- Died: 10 January 2019 (aged 96)
- Noble family: Lannoy
- Spouse: Alix della Faille de Leverghem (m. 1965; died 2012)
- Issue: Count Jehan de Lannoy; Count Christian de Lannoy; Nathalie Hamilton; Countess Gaëlle de Lannoy; Count Amaury de Lannoy; Count Olivier de Lannoy; Isabelle de le Court; Stéphanie, Grand Duchess of Luxembourg
- Father: Count Paul Charles de Lannoy
- Mother: Princess Marie Béatrix de Ligne

Count Philippe de Lannoy (14 August 1922 – 10 January 2019) was a Belgian nobleman and provincial councillor of Hainaut. He was the alderman of finance for Frasnes-lez-Anvaing. He was the father of Stéphanie, Grand Duchess of Luxembourg. His title in French was comte de Lannoy et du Saint-Empire.

== Early life ==
Philippe was born as the eldest child of Count Paul Charles de Lannoy (1898–1980) and his wife, Princess Marie Béatrix of Ligne (1898–1982), daughter of Ernest, 10th Prince of Ligne (1857–1937) and Diane de Cossé-Brissac (1869–1950).

== Personal life ==
He married Alix della Faille de Leverghem in 1965. Alix died on 27 August 2012 at the age of 70.

The Count and Countess had eight children:

- Count Jehan Marie Paul Emmanuel Harold de Lannoy (b. 22 December 1966), married Béatrice Spates (b. 20 February 1968), daughter of Alfred Waters Spates and Marie Renée Kneppelhout van Sterkenburg, on 25 September 1993. They have four children:
  - Countess Caroline de Lannoy (b. 16 July 2001), married Vicomte Henry de Spoelberch (b. 1999) on 31 August 2024 in Frasnes-lez-Anvaing.
  - Countess Louise de Lannoy (b. 4 May 2003)
  - Count Antoine de Lannoy (b. 3 February 2005)
  - Count Maxime de Lannoy (b. 19 June 2006)
- Count Christian Marie Harold Philippe de Lannoy (b. 11 February 1968), married Luísa Moreno de Porras-Isla-Fernández on 18 July 2009. They have three children:
  - Countess Teresa de Lannoy (b. 24 June 2010)
  - Count Ignace de Lannoy (b. 5 September 2012)
  - Count Jacques de Lannoy (b. 18 February 2014)
- Countess Nathalie Marie Béatrice Lydia de Lannoy (b. 11 February 1969), married John Hamilton (b. 1955) in 1996. They have six daughters:
  - Antonia Hamilton (b. 1997)
  - Charlotte Hamilton (b. 1999)
  - Madeleine Hamilton (b. 2001)
  - Alix Hamilton (b. 2004)
  - Vitória Hamilton (b. 2008)
  - Elisabeth Hamilton
- Countess Gaëlle Marie Diane Madeleine de Lannoy (b. 16 November 1970), a religious sister.
- Count Amaury Marie Dominique Paul de Lannoy (b. 20 November 1971), married Astrid d'Harcourt (b. 1985) on 23 September 2016. They have two sons:
  - Count Théodore de Lannoy (b. 23 June 2018)
  - Count Foucault de Lannoy (b. 2021)
- Count Olivier Marie Arnaud Albert de Lannoy (b. 28 January 1974), married Alice van Havre (b. 1980) on 2 August 2006. They have three children:
  - Count Philippe de Lannoy (b. 2010)
  - Count Gustave de Lannoy (b. 20 August 2013)
  - Count Léopold de Lannoy (b. 6 June 2016)
- Countess Isabelle Myriam Jehanne Alix de Lannoy (b. 28 July 1976), married Jean-Charles de le Court (b. 1969), son of Jean-Charles de le Court and Suzanne d'Otreppe de Bouvette, on 29 September 2001. They have six children:
  - Isaure de le Court (b. 6 June 2003)
  - Aline de le Court (b. 13 July 2005)
  - Lancelot de le Court (b. 2007)
  - Héloïse de le Court (b. 2010)
  - Nicodème de le Court (b. 12 March 2013)
  - Constantin de le Court (b. 25 November 2015)
- Countess Stéphanie Marie Claudine Christine de Lannoy (b. 18 February 1984) married Guillaume V, Grand Duke of Luxembourg (b. 11 November 1981) on 19 October 2012. They have two sons:
  - Prince Charles Jean Philippe Joseph Marie Guillaume of Luxembourg (b. 10 May 2020)
  - Prince François Henri Louis Marie Guillaume of Luxembourg (b. 27 March 2023)

== Death and legacy ==
He died on 10 January 2019 at the age of 96. The funeral, attended by Queen Matilde, took place at the Church of Saint-Amand in Frasnes-lez-Anvaing. He is remembered fondly and with gratitude as having been a volunteer for the First Belgian Field Regiment during World War II.

== Honours and decorations ==
- Volunteer's Medal 1940–1945 (1946).
- Officer of the Order of Leopold II.
- Knight of the Order of Leopold.
- Grand Decoration of Honour for Services to the Republic of Austria..
- Knight Grand Cross Jure Sanguinis of the Sacred Military Constantinian Order of Saint George (1982).
