= Charles de Limburg Stirum =

Count Charles de Limburg-Stirum
- Charles de Limburg Stirum
- Born: 15 September 1906; Huldenberg, Belgium
- Died: 14 June 1989 (aged 82); Brussels, Belgium
- Spouse: Princess Marie Kunigunde of Lobkowicz
- Issue: 8 children
- Father: Count Evrard Philippe de Limburg Stirum
- Mother: Louise, Baroness Gericke d'Herwijnen
- Occupation: Senator, Grand Master of the Royal Households of King Leopold III

Count Charles Gaëtan Corneille Marie François-Xavier Ghislain de Limburg-Stirum (15 September 1906 – 14 June 1989), a Count of the Holy Roman Empire and Knight of the Golden Fleece (Austrian branch), was a member of the House of Limburg-Stirum. During his life he was a Belgian Senator and Grand Master of the Royal Households of King Leopold III.

== Life ==
Charles was born in Huldenberg, Belgium, and was the second son of Count Evrard Philippe de Limburg Stirum (29 October 1868 – 8 May 1938) and Louise, Baroness Gericke d'Herwijnen (17 April 1881 - 6 September 1969). He was later adopted by his aunt, Countess Marie de Limburg-Stirum who was without descent, to inherit the castle of Bois Saint Jean in the South of Belgium.

During World War II, he fought as a captain with the Belgian panzer troops and was made prisoner by the Germans. After being released, he took an active part in the armed resistance against the occupier. Bois Saint Jean became an important drop point of material and arms to the Belgian resistance. During the Von Rundstedt Offensive in the winter of 1944, Bois Saint Jean was overtaken by the Germans and used as local headquarter. The US Army Air Force bombed it to the ground in January 1945. After the war, he rebuilt the castle of Bois Saint Jean, though in a different style than the original building.

Charles de Limburg Stirum served as Senator, then was appointed Grand Master of the King Leopold III after King Leopold's abdication. He held this office until 1971.

He died in Brussels on 14 June 1989.

== Marriage and descent ==
On 13 June 1932 in Křimice (Bohemia) he married Princess Marie Kunigunde of Lobkowicz (1906-2005), a daughter of Jaroslav, 11th Prince of Lobkowicz, Duke of Roudnice (26 March 1877 - 24 October 1953) and Countess Marie-Thérèse of Beaufort-Spontin (6 August 1885 - 22 February 1942).

They had eight children:

- Countess Marie Keijsers of Limburg-Stirum; born in 1935. In 1956, she married Count Gobert-Leopold d'Aspermont Lynden and they have seven children:
  - Count Jean d'Aspermont; born in 1957. He married Dominique Lamarche and they have two children:
    - Count Gobert d'Aspermont; born in 1986.
    - Countess Diane d'Aspermont; born in 1990.
  - Countess Elizabeth d'Aspermont; born in 1958.
  - Count Philippe d'Aspermont; born in 1959.
  - Count Geoffrey d'Aspermont; born in 1962.
  - Countess Sophie d'Aspermont; born in 1964.
  - Countess Clothilde d'Aspermont; born in 1967. In 1993, she married Philippe Haeglsteen.
  - Count Cristoph d'Aspermont; born in 1979.
- Countess Gabrielle Keijsers of Limburg-Stirum; born in 1936. In 1958, she married Count Didier Cornet d'Elzius du Chenoy and they have three children:
  - Count Etienne Cornet d'Elzius du Chenoy; born in 1959. He married Dominique de Wasseige and they have four children:
    - Count Gaël Cornet d'Elzius du Chenoy; born in 1989.
    - Countess Muriel Cornet d'Elzius du Chenoy; born in 1991.
    - Count Brieuc Cornet d'Elzius du Chenoy; born in 1994.
    - Countess Valentine Cornet d'Elzius du Chenoy; born in 1996.
  - Count Xavier Cornet d'Elzius du Chenoy; born in 1961. In 1985, he married Baroness Joëlle de Crombrugghe de Looringhe and they have three children:
    - Count Cristophe Cornet d'Elzius du Chenoy; born in 1988.
    - Countess Marie-Caroline Cornet d'Elzius du Chenoy; born in 1991.
    - Countess Sophie Cornet d'Elzius du Chenoy; born in 1992.
  - Countess Beatrice Cornet d'Elzius du Chenoy; born in 1965.
- Count Bernard Keijsers of Limburg-Stirum; born in 1938. In 1970, he firstly married Countess Nathalie de la Boissiere-Thiennes and they have two children:
  - Count Charles-Philippe Keijsers of Limburg-Stirum; born in 1971.
  - Count Leopold Keijsers of Limburg-Stirum; born in 1978. He then married Régine Roberti.
- Count Emmanuel Keijsers of Limburg-Stirum; born in Huldenberg in 1940. In 1968, he married Countess Nadine d'Ursel and they have three children:
  - Countess Eleonore Keijsers of Limburg-Stirum; born in 1970.
  - Count Wolfgang Keijsers of Limburg-Stirum; born in 1971.
  - Count Arnaud Keijsers of Limburg-Stirum; born in 1974.
- Countess Sibylle Keijsers of Limburg-Stirum; born in 1942. In 1964, she married Pietro del Vaglio Rosati and they have four children:
  - Miss Christiana del Vaglio Rosati; born in 1966.
  - Miss Marina del Vaglio Rosati; born in 1968. In 1992, she married Comte Cedric de Lalaing.
  - Miss Gabriella del Vaglio Rosati; born in 1970.
  - Miss Natalia del Vaglio Rosati; born in 1975.
- Countess Jacqueline Keijsers of Limburg-Stirum; born in 1943. In 1989, she married Baron Bonifatius von Twickel.
- Count Jean Keijsers of Limburg-Stirum; born in 1946.
- Countess Louise Keijsers; born in 1949.

== Honours and awards ==
=== Belgian honours ===
- Grand Cross of the Order of the Crown
- Grand Cross of the Order of Leopold II
- Knight of the Order of Leopold

=== Belgian awards ===
- Croix de Guerre with bronze lion
- Volunteer's Medal 1940-1945
- Commemorative Medal of the War 1940-1945 with crossed swords
- Prisoner of War Medal 1940-1945
- Resistance Medal 1940-1945
- Honorary Insignia of Work

=== Foreign honours ===
- Knight of the Order of the Golden Fleece (Austrian Branch)
- United Kingdom: Honorary Knight Grand Cross of the Royal Victorian Order (United Kingdom) (GCVO)
- Holy See: Grand Cross of the Pontifical Order of St Gregory the Great (Holy See) (GCSG)
- Luxembourg: Grand Cross of the Order of the Oak Crown (Luxembourg)
- Brazil: Grand Cross of the Order of the Southern Cross (Brazil)
- Japan: Grand Cordon of the Order of the Rising Sun (Japan)
- Netherlands: Grand Cross of the Order of the House of Orange (Netherlands)
- Austria: Grand Cross of the Order of Merit (Austria)
- Senegal: Grand Cross of the Order of Merit (Senegal)
- Sweden: Commander Grand Cross of the Royal Order of the Polar Star (Sweden)
- Denmark: Grand Commander of the Order of the Dannebrog (Denmark)
- Norway: Knight Grand Cross of the Royal Norwegian Order of St Olav
- Thailand: Knight Grand Cross of the Order of the Crown of Thailand
- Serbia: Grand Officer of the Order of the Yugoslav Flag

=== Foreign awards ===
- French Liberation Medal
- Various foreign awards

=== Honorific eponyms ===
- Mount Limburg Stirum

== Ancestry ==
Charles's ancestors in three generations
Charles de Limburg Stirum	Father: Count Evrard de Limburg Stirum	Paternal Grandfather: Count Thierry de Limburg Stirum, Senator	Paternal Great-grandfather: Count Willem Bernard de Limburg Stirum
Charles de Limburg Stirum	Father: Count Evrard de Limburg Stirum	Paternal Grandfather: Count Thierry de Limburg Stirum, Senator	Paternal Great-grandmother: Albertine de Pret Roose de Calesberg
Charles de Limburg Stirum	Father: Count Evrard de Limburg Stirum	Paternal Grandmother: Marie, Countess de Thiennes Leyenburg et de Rumbeke	Paternal Great-grandfather: François Joseph, Count de Thiennes Leyenburg et de Rumbeke, Chambellan of King William of the Netherlands
Charles de Limburg Stirum	Father: Count Evrard de Limburg Stirum	Paternal Grandmother: Marie, Countess de Thiennes Leyenburg et de Rumbeke	Paternal Great-grandmother: Asterie, Baroness de Draeck
Charles de Limburg Stirum	Mother: Louise, Baroness Gericke d'Herwijnen	Maternal Grandfather: Charles, Baron Gericke d'Herwijnen, Ambassador and Chambellan of the Queen of the Netherlands	Maternal Great-grandfather: Joseph (Louis), Baron Gericke d'Herwijnen, Minister of State, Minister of Foreign Affairs and Ambassador
Charles de Limburg Stirum	Mother: Louise, Baroness Gericke d'Herwijnen	Maternal Grandfather: Charles, Baron Gericke d'Herwijnen, Ambassador and Chambellan of the Queen of the Netherlands	Maternal Great-grandmother: Lady Elisabeth Huughe de Peutevin
Charles de Limburg Stirum	Mother: Louise, Baroness Gericke d'Herwijnen	Maternal Grandmother: Marie, Countess du Chastel de la Howarderie	Maternal Great-grandfather: Robert, Count du Chastel de la Howarderie, Chambellan of the King of the Netherlands
Charles de Limburg Stirum	Mother: Louise, Baroness Gericke d'Herwijnen	Maternal Grandmother: Marie, Countess du Chastel de la Howarderie	Maternal Great-grandmother: Gabrielle, Baroness de Vinck de Westwesel
