= Medal of the Armed Resistance 1940–1945 =

Belgian war medal

Resistance Medal 1940–1945
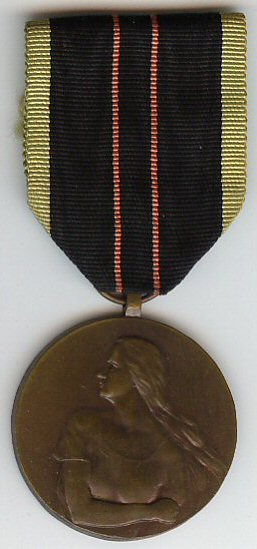
- Resistance Medal 1940–1945 (obverse)
- Type: War medal
- Awarded for: Service in the resistance or in undercover intelligence gathering
- Presented by: Belgium
- Eligibility: Belgian citizens
- Status: No longer awarded
- Established: 16 February 1946
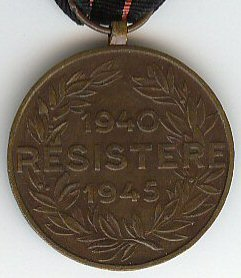
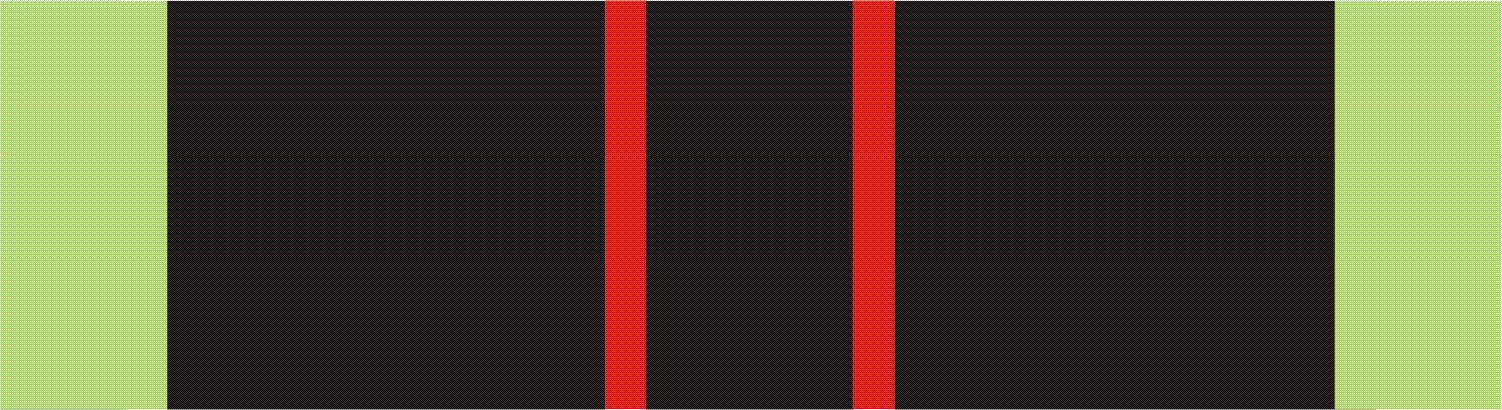
- Reverse of the medal Ribbon bar

The Resistance Medal 1940–1945 (French: Médaille de la Résistance 1940–1945, Dutch: Medaille van de Weerstand 1940–1945) was a Belgian war medal established by royal decree of the Regent on 16 February 1946 and awarded to all members of the Belgian armed resistance during the Second World War and to members of the intelligence service who operated in occupied territories and participated in combat actions aimed at the liberation of Belgium.

== Award description ==
The Resistance Medal 1940–1945 was a 39mm in diameter circular bronze medal. Its obverse bore the upper body of a young woman facing left in defiance with her right fist clenched. The reverse bore the relief inscription in Latin on three lines "1940 RESISTERE 1945" superimposed over a laurel wreath.

The medal was suspended by a ring through a suspension loop from a 37 mm wide black silk moiré ribbon with two central 1 mm wide red stripes 5 mm apart and 4 mm light green edge stripes. The colours of the ribbon were symbolic, the black denoting the dark days of the German occupation and/or the clandestine nature of the resistance, the green stood the hope of liberation and the red for the spilled blood of the resistance members.

== Notable recipients (partial list) ==
The individuals listed below were awarded the Medal of the Armed Resistance:

- Lieutenant General Ernest Engelen
- Cavalry Major General Jules François Gaston Everaert
- Lieutenant General Jules Joseph Pire
- Lieutenant General Alphonse Verstraete
- Lieutenant General Joseph Leroy
- Cavalry Lieutenant General Jules De Boeck
- Police Lieutenant General Louis Joseph Leroy
- Achille van Acker
- Edmond Leburton
- Alfons Vranckx
- Baron Albert Lilar
- Count Harold d’Aspremont Lynden
- Count Jean-Charles Snoy et d’Oppuers
- Viscount Omer Vanaudenhove
- Geraard van den Daele
- Count Count Jean d’Ursel
- Baron Pierre van Outryve d’Ydewalle
- Count Charles of Limburg Stirum
- Robberechts Henri
- Marcel Verriest
- Josephine Baker
- Elisabeth Barbier

== See also ==
- Resistance during World War II
- Resistance movement
- Orders, decorations, and medals of Belgium

== Other sources ==
- Quinot H., 1950, Recueil illustré des décorations belges et congolaises, 4e Edition. (Hasselt)
- Cornet R., 1982, Recueil des dispositions légales et réglementaires régissant les ordres nationaux belges. 2e Ed. N.pl., (Brussels)
- Borné A.C., 1985, Distinctions honorifiques de la Belgique, 1830–1985 (Brussels)
