= Elisabeth Barbier (resister) =

French resistance fighter (1912–1968)

- Born: Marie-Elisabeth Barbier; 1912; Nice, France
- Died: 12 April 1968 (aged 55–56); Jerusalem, Israel
- Occupation: Resistance captain
- Known for: War resistance
- Spouse: Stephen James Campbell
- Children: 3

Elisabeth Barbier (1912–1968) was a highly decorated French resistance fighter and a captain in the Free French Forces during World War II. When her contact with the London underground was cut off, she joined French and Belgian resisters and was instrumental in saving 150 Allied airmen who were in danger of being caught by German troops behind the front lines. After the War ended, she married a United States diplomat and became known as Mrs. Stephen Campbell.

== Biography ==
Marie-Elisabeth Barbier was born in 1912 in Nice, France, into a family that manufactured industrial explosives. She was the daughter of Camille Barbier (1889–1962) and Eugène Barbier (1885–1941), an industrialist. His father was Eugène Barbier (1851–1944), founder in 1893 of the Society for Explosives and Chemical Products. One member of her family, who was an early member of the French resistance, proved to have key responsibilities and had information that was valuable to the underground resisters. Barbier's brother-in-law, Jack Leroux, was married to her sister Henriette and headed the union of industrial explosives manufacturers as well as the industry's organizing committee. At the same time, Leroux was head of the Franco-German industrial consortium. The combination of Leroux and Barbier proved to be a powerful one, allowing their two resistance networks to collaborate within one family in "near-total secrecy."

By October 1940, she had become an active intelligence agent in France serving the London headquarters as part of the nationwide resistance group called Free France.

However, in 1941, her French group leader was shot, which severed her link with headquarters in England. She responded by joining other Belgian and French groups who were dedicated to rescuing Allied airmen stranded in occupied France and Belgium. In that role, she helped facilitate the rescue of 150 airmen (French, Polish, American and British) and sending them to safety in Spain, a feat that was cited later when she was awarded the French Legion of Honor medal. By 1942, she had formed her own group called the Vaneau, which included several family members, and she served as the network's captain.

Barbier became known for her radio transmissions to the Allies in London, including the Doyen Report detailing armistice conditions, and later broadcast on French radio in London. She was also able to send insider news about the Organization of the Armaments Producers in 1941, thus relaying information from Leroux about the workings of three gunpowder companies in Blancpignon, Saint Médard and Angoulême. Her transmission resulted in the bombings of the gunpowder manufacturers by the Royal Air Force.

Barbier was betrayed by a Belgian double agent named Jacques Desoubrie. On 18 June 1943, she was arrested with her mother (team leader, Camille Barbier) by the Gestapo and sent to the Ravensbrück concentration camp for women. According to the citation presented with Barbier's Medal for the French Legion of Honour, "she gave up neither names nor information despite threats and torture. Deported to Ravensbrück in January 1944, she continued her work as a great French patriot until the camp's liberation." Both women survived the camp, which was freed in April 1945.

After returning to France from captivity, she was "surprised" to learn that Leroux had been imprisoned for supplying explosives to German occupiers. The underground work of Elisabeth and Jack had been so secret that no one knew of his instrumental work with the French Resistance. She said, "the error committed against him was, in my opinion, motivated solely by the almost absolute secrecy surrounding all his patriotic activities, which, due to the circumstances, I was one of the few people to know about." The ensuing investigation into his clandestine wartime efforts led to his freedom.

After the War ended, she married Stephen James Campbell, a United States diplomat.

Elisabeth Barbier died in Jerusalem, Israel, of lung cancer on 12 April 1968, survived by her husband and two sons, Sean and Patrick.

== Honors and distinctions ==
- Knight of the French Legion of Honour, May 23, 1945 (citing "the rescue of 150 Allied airmen")
- French Croix de Guerre with palm
- American Medal of Freedom with Bronze Palm
- British King's Medal for Courage in the Cause of Freedom
- Belgian Resistance Medal
- and five other French service ribbons
