= Moustier, Hainaut =

Moustier
- Village
- Location in Belgium
- Coordinates: 50°39′20″N 03°37′13″E
- Country: Belgium
- Region: Wallonia
- Province: Hainaut
- Municipality: Frasnes-lez-Anvaing

Area
  - Total: 9.45 km^{2} (3.65 sq mi)

Population (31 December 2006)
  - Total: 654
  - Density: 69.2/km^{2} (179/sq mi)
- Postal code: 7911
- Website: frasnes-lez-anvaing.be (in French)

Moustier (Walloon: Moutiè) is a village of Wallonia and district of the municipality of Frasnes-lez-Anvaing, located in the province of Hainaut, Belgium.

It was a municipality until January 1, 1977.
