= Commemorative Medal of the 1940–1945 War =

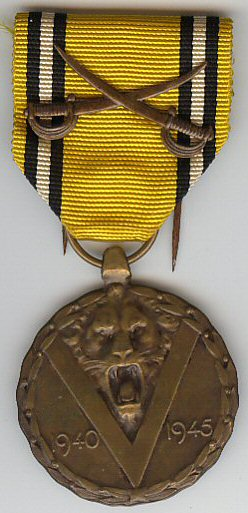
- Commemorative War Medal 1940–1945 (obverse)
- Type: Medal
- Awarded for: Military service between 10 May 1940 and 7 May 1945
- Presented by: Kingdom of Belgium
- Eligibility: Personnel of the Belgian Armed Forces, members of the Belgian Resistance, Belgian Merchant Navy personnel
- Status: No longer awarded
- Established: 16 February 1945
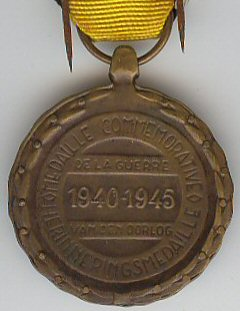
- Medal reverse Ribbon bar

Precedence
- Next (higher): Volunteer's Medal 1940–1945
- Next (lower): Foreign Operational Theatres Commemorative Medal

The Commemorative Medal of the 1940–45 War (French: Médaille Commémorative de la Guerre 1940–45, Dutch: De Herinneringsmedaille van de Oorlog 1940–1945) was a military decoration of Belgium. It was established by royal decree of the Prince Regent on 16 February 1945 to recognise Belgian servicemen and women who served during World War II. It was also awarded to members of the Belgian Resistance and members of Belgium's Merchant Navy on the side of the Allies. Later decrees allowed for its award to foreign recipients of the Belgian Croix de Guerre.

== Award description ==
=== Insignia ===
The Commemorative Medal of the War 1940–1945 was a 38mm in diameter circular bronze medal, the obverse bore a large V for Victory sign with a relief roaring lion in the V, at lower left was the relief year "1940", at lower right the relief year "1945". A 3mm wide laurel wreath encircled the entire medal on both the obverse and reverse. On the reverse, within a 5mm wide raised circle, the relief inscriptions (French: MEDAILLE COMMEMORATIVE) within the upper half and (Dutch: HERINNERINGSMEDAILLE) in the lower half, in the center of the raised circle, two 3mm high raised horizontal bars positioned 8mm apart, the upper one bearing the relief inscription (French: DE LA GUERRE), the lower one bearing (Dutch: VAN DER OORLOG), at center, between the two horizontal bars, the relief years "1940–1945".

The medal was suspended by a ring through a lateral suspension loop from a 37mm wide yellow silk moiré ribbon with 8mm wide edge stripes composed of 2mm wide stripes of yellow, black, white and black, the yellow being closest to the edges.

=== Ribbon devices ===
Many ribbon devices are allowed for wear:

- crossed sabres denoting combat service in the 1940 campaign or service in the armed resistance,
- crossed anchors denoting naval combat service,
- crossed lightning flashes denoting service in intelligence,
- a small lion denoting a mention in dispatches,
- a red enamelled cross denoting a combat wound,
- bronze bars denoting years as a POW,
- a star denoting colonial troops,
- a crown denoting a volunteer,
- multiple campaign clasps (some straight, some elliptical):
  - Straight clasps:
    - Ardennes
    - Ardennes Belges
    - Atlantique Nord
    - Bataille D'Angelterre
    - Battaille de Belgique 1940
    - Beauquesne
    - Belgique
    - Campagne D'Allemagne
    - Campagne De Hollande
    - Canal Albert
    - Canal Albert-Kanne
    - Canal De Terneuzen
    - Canal de Wessem
    - Dieppe
    - Emden
    - Escaut
    - Flandres 1940
    - Frontiere
    - Italie
    - Knesselare
    - La Dendre 1940
    - La Gette
    - La Lys 1940
    - Liege 1940
    - Manche
    - Namur 1940
    - Nevele
    - Normandie
    - Oldenburg
    - Ronsele
    - Vinkt
    - Walcheren
    - Winterbeek
    - Yougoslavie
    - Zelzate
    - Zwijndrecht
  - Elliptical clasps:
    - Allemagne 1944–1945
    - France 1944
    - Pays-Bas 1944–1945
    - Tchecoslovaquie 1945
    - Ardennes 1944–1945

== Notable recipients (partial list) ==
The individuals listed below were awarded the Commemorative Medal of the War 1940–1945:

- Lieutenant General Baron Charles de Cumont
- Lieutenant General Albert Baron Crahay
- Cavalry Lieutenant General Marcel Jooris
- Lieutenant General Roger Dewandre
- Lieutenant General Ernest Engelen
- Lieutenant General Sir Louis Teysen
- Lieutenant General Constant Weyns
- Police Lieutenant General August Van Wanzeele
- Aviator Lieutenant General Armand Crekillie
- Major General Maurice Jacmart
- Divisional Admiral Léon Lurquin
- Aviator Vice Admiral Sir André Schlim
- Cavalry Major General Jules François Gaston Everaert
- Lieutenant General Jean-Baptiste Piron
- Lieutenant General Jules Joseph Pire
- Cavalry Lieutenant General Sir Maximilien de Neve de Roden
- Lieutenant General Alphonse Verstraete
- Major General Baron Georges Danloy
- Lieutenant General Baron Raoul de Hennin de Boussu-Walcourt
- Lieutenant General Joseph Leroy
- Cavalry Lieutenant General Jules De Boeck
- François Ernest Samray
- Lieutenant General Fernand Vanderhaeghen
- Lieutenant General Robert Oor
- Lieutenant General Libert Elie Thomas
- Lieutenant General Léon Bievez
- Cavalry Major General Baron Beaudoin de Maere d'Aertrycke
- Major General Lucien Van Hoof
- Major General Jean Buysse
- Major General Paul Jacques
- Commodore Georges Timmermans
- Aviator Major General Norbert Leboutte
- Police Lieutenant General Louis Joseph Leroy
- Police Lieutenant General Oscar-Eugène Dethise
- Chaplain General Louis Kerremans
- Count Pierre Harmel
- Lucienne Marie Adans

== See also ==
- Orders, decorations, and medals of Belgium
- Belgian honours order of wearing

== Other sources ==
- Quinot H., 1950, Recueil illustré des décorations belges et congolaises, 4e Edition. (Hasselt)
- Cornet R., 1982, Recueil des dispositions légales et réglementaires régissant les ordres nationaux belges. 2e Ed. N.pl., (Brussels)
- Borné A.C., 1985, Distinctions honorifiques de la Belgique, 1830–1985 (Brussels)
- WINKLER PRINS: Herinneringsmedaille van de oorlog 1940–1945.
