= Alix de Lannoy =

Belgian noblewoman

- Countess de Lannoy
- Full name: Baroness Alix Marie Isabelle Louise Ghislaine della Faille de Leverghem
- Born: 20 September 1941; Leuven, Belgium
- Died: 26 August 2012 (aged 70); Brussels, Belgium
- Spouse: Count Philippe de Lannoy (m. 1965)
- Issue: Count Jehan; Count Christian; Nathalie Hamilton; Countess Gaëlle; Count Amaury; Count Olivier; Baroness Isabelle de le Court; Stéphanie, Grand Duchess of Luxembourg
- Father: Harold Marie della Faille de Leverghem
- Mother: Madeleine Marie de Brouchoven de Bergeyck

Countess Alix de Lannoy (née Alix della Faille de Leverghem; 20 September 1941 – 26 August 2012) was a Belgian noblewoman and the mother of Stephanie, Grand Duchess of Luxembourg.

== Biography ==
Alix was a daughter of Baron Harold della Faille de Leverghem, a member of an Antwerp family ennobled in 1614, and Countess Madeleine de Brouchoven de Bergeyck. One of the ancestors of Alix de Lannoy was Hélène Fourment, Countess de Bergeyck.

Alix married Count Philippe de Lannoy in 1965 and had eight children. Their youngest child, Countess Stéphanie, married Guillaume, Hereditary Grand Duke of Luxembourg, on 20 October 2012.

She was living at the Lannoys' ancestral Château de Hun in Anvaing, where she was the honorary librarian of the municipal library.

The countess died following a sudden stroke on 26 August 2012, at the age of 70. The Grand Ducal Family of Luxembourg released a statement, "Their Royal Highnesses Prince Guillaume, the Grand Duke, the Grand Duchess and the whole family join in the pain of the Count de Lannoy and his beloved family with our sincere and deepest regret."

The funeral of Countess Alix de Lannoy was held in Frasnes-lez-Anvaing, Belgium, attended by members of the Luxembourger and Belgian royal families.

== Children ==
Alix and her husband had eight children, one of whom, Stéphanie, married Guillaume V, Grand Duke of Luxembourg.

== Literature ==
- Y. SCHMITZ, Les della Faille, 6 volumes, Brussels, 1965–1974.
- Hervé DOUXCHAMPS, Aux origines de la famille della Faille, in: Le Parchemin, 1989, blz. 61-77 & 1992, blz. 40–43.
- Humbert DE MARNIX DE SAINTE ALDEGONDE, État présent de la noblesse belge, Annuaire 2006, Brussels, 2006 (della Faille); Annuaire 2009, Brussels, 2009 (de Lannoy).
