= Frasnes-lez-Anvaing =

Municipality in Hainaut Province, Wallonia, Belgium

Frasnes-lez-Anvaing Fraine-lez-Anvégne (Picard)
- Municipality
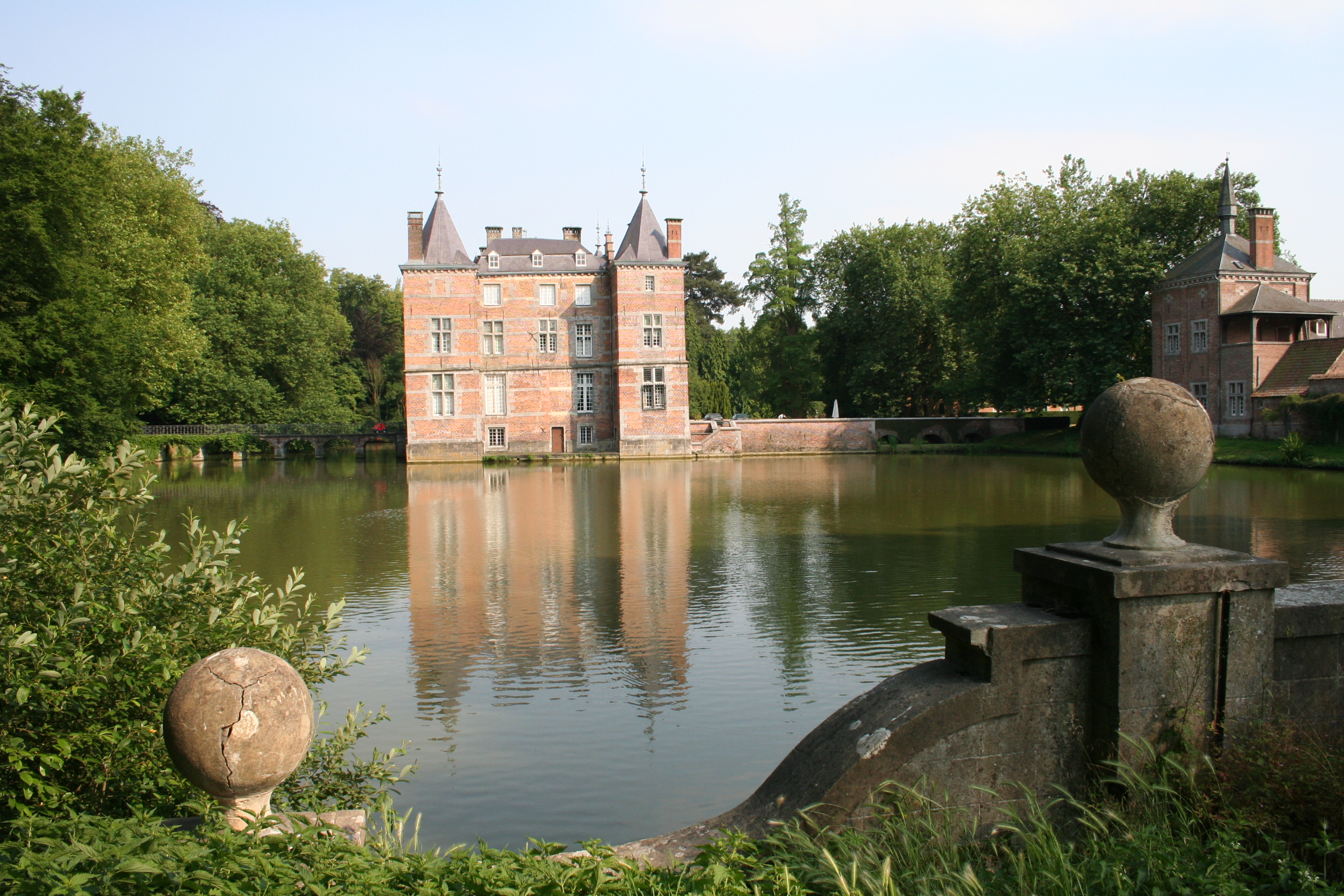

- Flag Coat of arms

- Location of Frasnes-lez-Anvaing in Hainaut
- Interactive map of Frasnes-lez-Anvaing
- Location in Belgium
- Coordinates: 50°41′N 03°38′E
- Country: Belgium
- Community: French Community
- Region: Wallonia
- Province: Hainaut
- Arrondissement: Ath

Government
  - Mayor: Carine De Saint Martin (MR)
  - Governing party: MR

Area
  - Total: 112.86 km^{2} (43.58 sq mi)

Population (2018-01-01)
  - Total: 11,740
  - Density: 104.0/km^{2} (269.4/sq mi)
- Postal codes: 7910-7912
- NIS code: 51065
- Area codes: 069
- Website: www.frasnes-lez-anvaing.be

Frasnes-lez-Anvaing (French pronunciation: [fʁan le ɑ̃vɛ̃]; Picard: Fraine-lez-Anvégne; Walloon: Fraine-dilé-Anvegn) is a municipality of Wallonia located in the province of Hainaut, Belgium.

On 1 January 2018, the municipality had 11,740 inhabitants. The total area is 112.44 km^{2}, giving a population density of 100 inhabitants per km^{2}.

The municipality consists of the following districts: Anvaing, Arc-Ainières, Buissenal, Cordes, Dergneau, Forest, Frasnes-lez-Buissenal, Hacquegnies, Herquegies, Montrœul-au-Bois, Moustier, Œudeghien, Saint-Sauveur, and Wattripont.

In August 2012, the funeral of Countess Alix de Lannoy, mother of Stéphanie de Lannoy, was held in Frasnes, attended by members of the Luxembourg and Belgian royal families.
