= Institut Albert-le-Grand =

Institut Albert-le-Grand is an international program combining humanities and political science. It is offered by Ircom (Institute of Public Relations and Communication) and is located in Ponts-de-Cé/Angers, France. It prepares a double degree in Letters and Political Science in partnership with the University of Angers. "The subjects taught are economics, history, geopolitics, literature, philosophy, modern languages, etc." The first two years of the program are administered at the University of Angers, followed by the third year abroad at a partner university.

Ircom was founded in 1984 (42 years ago) by Abbé Hyacinthe-Marie Houard, who was posthumously accused of the act of pedophilia.

This Institut Albert-le-Grand, established by Ircom in 1993, bears the name of (in English) the Saint Albert the Great. Ircom is an establishment with a Catholic identity.

Notable alumni include Guillaume V, Grand Duke of Luxembourg.
