= Volunteer's Medal 1940–1945 =

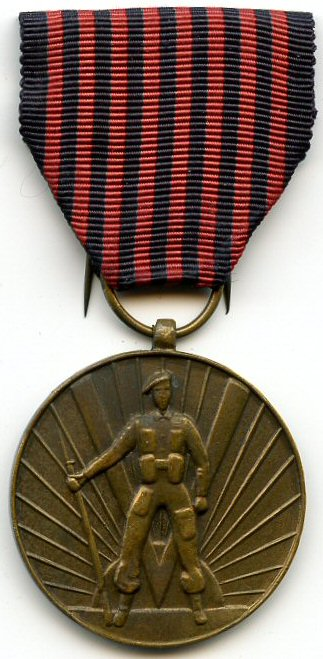
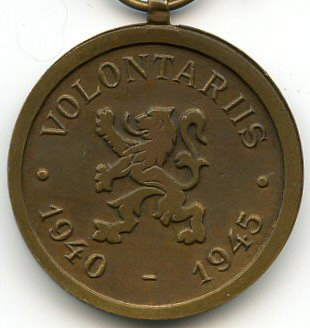
- Volunteer's Medal 1940–1945 (obverse and reverse)
- Type: War medal
- Awarded for: Voluntary enlistment in the Belgian Armed Forces during the Second World War
- Presented by: Kingdom of Belgium
- Eligibility: Belgian citizens and foreign nationals
- Status: No longer awarded
- Established: 16 February 1945
- Ribbon of the Medal

Count Charles of Limburg Stirum, a recipient of the Volunteer's Medal

The Volunteer's Medal 1940–1945 (French: "Médaille du Volontaire 1940–1945", Dutch: "Medaille van de Oorlogsvrijwilliger 1940–1945") was a Belgian war medal established by royal decree of the Regent on 16 February 1945 and awarded to Belgian and foreign civilians who voluntarily enlisted in the Belgian Armed Forces during the Second World War. The medal could also be awarded to volunteers serving in the Belgian units of the Royal Air Force, Royal Navy or British merchant navy.

== Award description ==
The Volunteer's Medal 1940–1945 was a 38 mm in diameter circular bronze medal. The obverse bore the relief image of a soldier standing at ease holding a rifle with a bayonet, the soldier is superimposed over a large capital letter V in front of a rising sun. The reverse bore the relief image of the Flemish "lion rampant" below the inscription in Latin "VOLONTARIIS", below the lion, the dates "1940" and "1945".

The medal was suspended by a ring through the suspension loop from a 38 mm wide silk moiré ribbon composed of fifteen 2 mm wide alternating red and blue stripes and two 4 mm wide blue edge stripes.

== Notable recipients (partial list) ==
The individuals listed below were awarded the 1940–1945 Volunteer's Medal:

- Baron Charles Marie Jean Joseph Elvire Ghislain Poswick
- Antoine Maria Joachim Lamoral, Prince of Ligne, Prince of Épinoy, Prince of Amblise
- Baron Philippe Robert-Jones
- Baron Paul Halter
- Lieutenant General Roger Dewandre
- Aviator Lieutenant General Armand Crekillie
- Divisional Admiral Léon Lurquin
- Aviator Vice Admiral Sir André Schlim
- Commodore Georges Timmermans
- Count Charles of Limburg Stirum
- Count Philippe de Lannoy

== See also ==
- Orders, decorations, and medals of Belgium

== Other sources ==
- Quinot H., 1950, Recueil illustré des décorations belges et congolaises, 4e Edition. (Hasselt)
- Cornet R., 1982, Recueil des dispositions légales et réglementaires régissant les ordres nationaux belges. 2e Ed. N.pl., (Brussels)
- Borné A.C., 1985, Distinctions honorifiques de la Belgique, 1830–1985 (Brussels)
