= Stéphanie, Grand Duchess of Luxembourg =

Grand Duchess of Luxembourg since 2025

Stéphanie
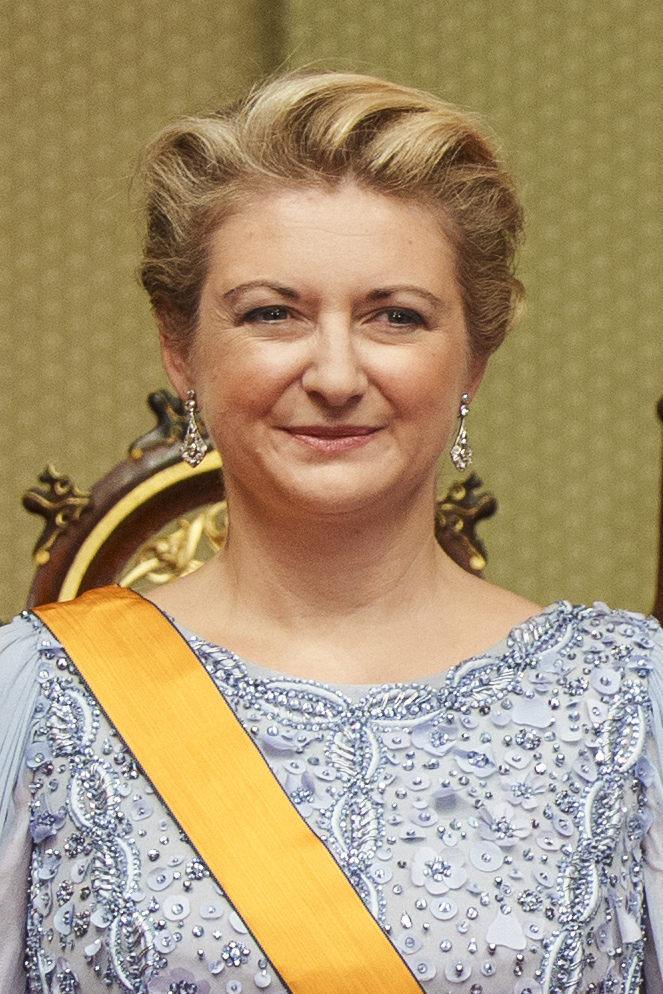
- Stéphanie in 2025

Grand Duchess consort of Luxembourg
- Tenure: 3 October 2025 – present
- Enthronement: 3 October 2025
- Born: Countess Stéphanie Marie Claudine Christine de Lannoy; 18 February 1984 (age 42); Ronse, East Flanders, Belgium
- Spouse: Guillaume V, Grand Duke of Luxembourg (m. 2012)
- Issue: Prince Charles; Prince François
- House: Lannoy (by birth); Luxembourg-Nassau (by marriage)
- Father: Count Philippe de Lannoy
- Mother: Alix della Faille de Leverghem

Stéphanie (born Countess Stéphanie de Lannoy on 18 February 1984) is Grand Duchess of Luxembourg as the wife of Grand Duke Guillaume V.

She became engaged to the then Hereditary Grand Duke on 26 April 2012 and married him, in a civil ceremony, on 19 October 2012, followed by a religious service the next day. The couple have two sons, Prince Charles and Prince François.

== Early life and ancestry ==
Stéphanie Marie Claudine Christine de Lannoy was born on 18 February 1984 in Ronse, East Flanders, Belgium. She is the youngest child and fourth daughter of the eight children of Count Philippe de Lannoy (1922–2019) and his wife, Alix della Faille de Leverghem (1941–2012).

The House of Lannoy has been traced back to the 13th-century nobility of Hainaut, its members distinguishing themselves in military command and affairs of state. Those descended from Charles de Lannoy, 1st Prince of Sulmona, the victor of Pavia, held the title of Imperial count/countess from 1526. One branch of the family is said to have immigrated to the United States, changed their name to Delano and were ancestors of Franklin Delano Roosevelt.

== Education and career ==
Stéphanie attended the Dutch-language Sancta Maria de Ronse school and continued her education at Collège Saint-Odile in France. She then returned to Brussels for studies at L'Institut de la Vierge Fidèle, before taking up Russian language and literature in Moscow for a year. She majored in German philology at the University of Louvain (UCLouvain) in Louvain-la-Neuve and also earned a master's degree at Humboldt University of Berlin. She is fluent in French, Luxembourgish, English and German.

While in Berlin, Stéphanie worked as an intern at the Walloon Export and Foreign Investment Agency under the sponsorship of the Belgian Embassy. When she returned to Belgium, she worked for an investment fund company in Brussels. Stéphanie studied art history at the Sotheby's Institute during her time with her husband in London from 2018 until 2019.

== Marriage and motherhood ==
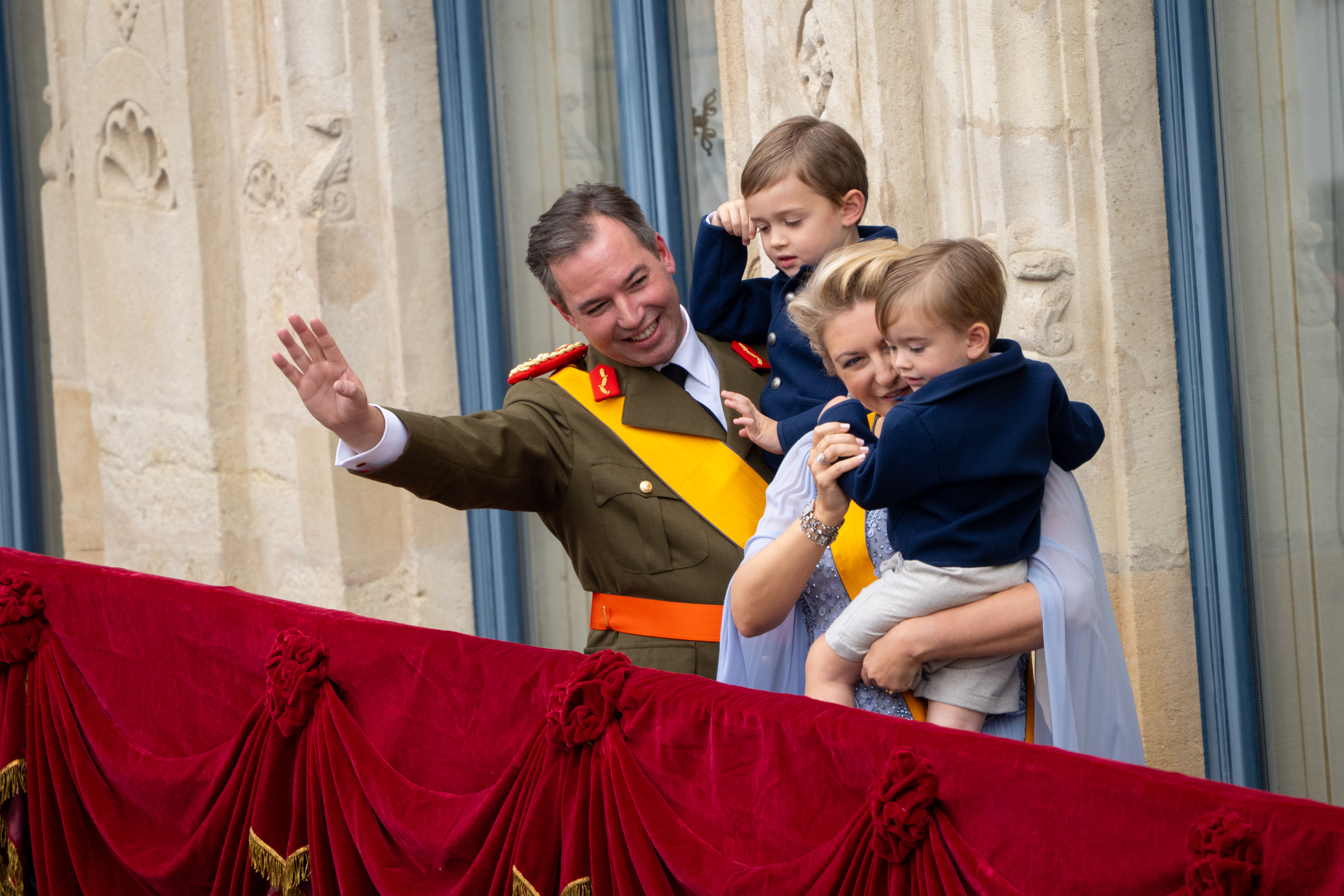
Stéphanie with her husband and two sons, on the day of his accession to the Grand Duchy, 2025

Stéphanie first met then Hereditary Grand Duke Guillaume in 2004, while attending a social gathering in Germany. They met each other for the second time in 2009 and started dating after the meeting. Guillaume and Stéphanie dated for about two years prior to their engagement. The betrothal was announced on 26 April 2012. Countess Stéphanie and the Hereditary Grand Duke married in a civil ceremony at the Town Hall, on 19 October 2012. Their religious wedding took place on 20 October 2012 at the Cathedral of Our Lady of Luxembourg. The bride wore a dress designed by Elie Saab and the Lannoy family diamond tiara. Wedding attendants included the groom's sister Princess Alexandra of Luxembourg and nephew Prince Gabriel, and the bride's nieces and nephew: Antonia and Madeleine Hamilton, Caroline and Louise de Lannoy, and Isaure and Lancelot de le Court.

Stéphanie and Guillaume have two sons, Charles (born on 10 May 2020) and Prince François (born on 27 March 2023), who are first and second in the line of succession to the throne of Luxembourg, respectively.

Stéphanie became a naturalized Luxembourg citizen and renounced her Belgian citizenship. She decided not to hold dual citizenship of Belgium and Luxembourg: "As the Hereditary Grand Duchess, I am proud to share my husband's nationality. Belgium will always be the country of my childhood and where my roots are, but I don't think keeping Belgian citizenship is consistent with the job that awaits me from now on."

== Activities ==
As the Grand Duchess, Stéphanie accompanies her husband on foreign visits, as well as many events within Luxembourg.

Since June 2012, Grand Duchess Stéphanie has been a member of the board of directors of the Fondation du Grand-Duc et de la Grande-Duchesse. In January 2016, she became The Grand Duke Jean Museum of Modern Art's chair of the board and became the honorary president in 2021. In 2013, she became a patron to the Les Amis des Musées d’art et d’histoire du Luxembourg association and regularly took part in "Midis de l'Art" that was organized by the organization. In 2014, she became the patron to the Scienteens Lab, a biomedical research laboratory for secondary school students founded by the Luxembourg Center for Systems Biomedicine (LCSB). She is also the patron to Blëtz asbl, a Luxembourg association that aims to help those affected by stroke. As a patron of Blëtz asbl, she support activities during World Stroke Day and learn about the conditions and possibilities of treatment through attending conferences, such as attending Conférence ergothérapie face à l’AVC in 2018. Since May 2017, she holds the position of honorary president and administrator of the De Mains de Maîtres Luxembourg association, an organization with mission of supporting artisans. She became a patron of Lët'z Arles association which supports Luxembourg photographers to exhibit their works at the annual Rencontres de la photographie in Arles. The Hereditary Grand Duke couple organized an exhibition in 2016 which aims to revalorize Luxembourg crafts sector. Princess Stéphanie regularly visits local organic agricultural producers and participates in academic sessions on the subject.

In July 2021, Princess Stéphanie, with her husband and son, inaugurated the Ettelbruck Agricultural Fair 2021. On 12 July, she and her family visited Luxembourg nursing homes to meet elderly people and ensure their well-being during the COVID-19 pandemic. At each of their visits, the couple expressed their gratitude to the staff of the nursing homes for their efforts in maintaining a warm environment for the residents throughout the pandemic. On 5 November, Stéphanie attended the Salon Cercle Artistique de Luxembourg, an art exhibition. Several weeks later, she attended the “Ideal Collection of Diane Venet” exhibition at the Cercle Cité in Luxembourg. In May 2022, she attended a charity concert titled "Luxembourg For Peace," organized by the Luxembourg Chamber Choir to support the actions of the Red Cross toward victims of the Russian invasion of Ukraine.

She became Grand Duchess of Luxembourg on 3 October 2025 on the accession of her husband.

== Honours ==
=== National honours ===
- Knight of the Order of the Gold Lion of the House of Nassau (3 October 2025)
- Grand Cross of Order of Adolphe of Nassau (19 October 2012)

=== Foreign honours ===
- Belgium:
  - Grand Cordon of the Order of Leopold (23 October 2025)
  - Grand Cross of the Order of the Crown (15 October 2019)
- Finland: Grand Cross of the Order of the White Rose of Finland (29 September 2026)
- Netherlands:
  - Knight Grand Cross of the Order of Orange-Nassau (23 May 2018)
  - Recipient of the King Willem-Alexander Inauguration Medal (30 April 2013)
- Portugal: Grand Cross of the Order of Merit (23 May 2017)
- Spain: Dame Grand Cross of the Royal Order of Isabella the Catholic (5 March 2026)

Grand Duchess Stéphanie House of Lannoy Born: 18 February 1984
Luxembourgish royalty
Preceded by María Teresa Mestre y Batista	Grand Duchess consort of Luxembourg; 2025–present	Incumbent
