= Guillaume V of Luxembourg =

Grand Duke of Luxembourg since 2025

Guillaume V
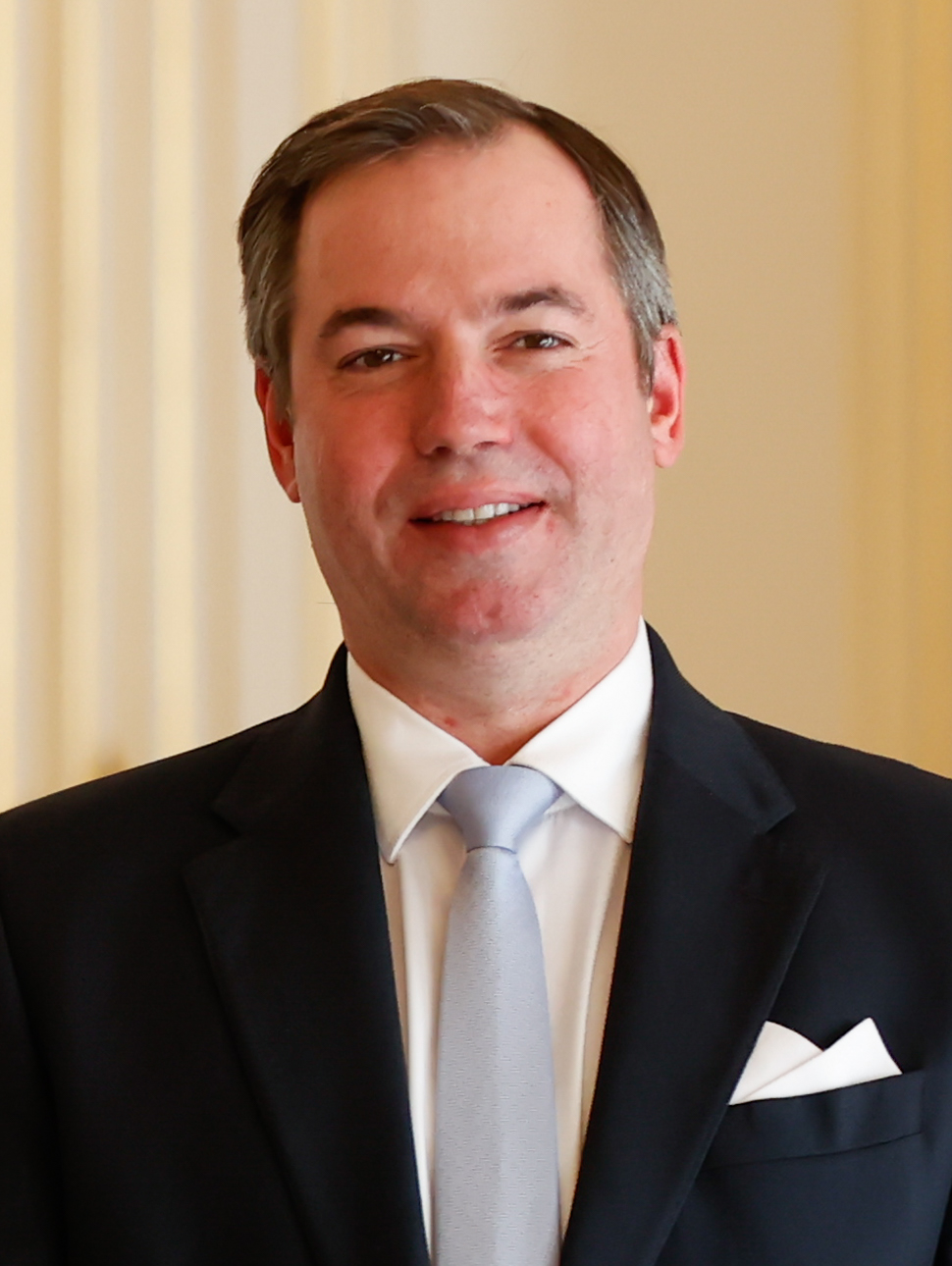
- Guillaume in 2026

Grand Duke of Luxembourg
- Reign: 3 October 2025 – present
- Enthronement: 3 October 2025
- Predecessor: Henri
- Heir apparent: Charles

Regent of Luxembourg
- Regency: 8 October 2024 – 3 October 2025
- Monarch: Henri
- Prime Ministers: See list: Luc Frieden
- Born: 11 November 1981 (age 44); Grand Duchess Charlotte Maternity Hospital, Luxembourg City, Luxembourg
- Spouse: Countess Stéphanie de Lannoy (m. 2012)
- Issue: Prince Charles; Prince François
Names
- Guillaume Jean Joseph Marie de Nassau
- House: Luxembourg-Nassau (official); Bourbon-Parma (agnatic)
- Father: Henri, Grand Duke of Luxembourg
- Mother: María Teresa Mestre y Batista
- Education: University College, Durham; Brunel University of London; University of Angers
- Military career
- Branch: Luxembourg Armed Forces
- Service years: 2002–2025
- Rank: Colonel

Guillaume V (Guillaume Jean Joseph Marie de Nassau; born 11 November 1981) is Grand Duke of Luxembourg, reigning since 3 October 2025.

The eldest son of Grand Duke Henri and Grand Duchess Maria Teresa, he acceded to the throne upon the abdication of his father.

== Early life and education ==
Guillaume was born on 11 November 1981 at the Grand Duchess Charlotte Maternity Hospital in Luxembourg City as the eldest child of Grand Duke Henri of Luxembourg and his wife, Cuban-born Grand Duchess Maria Teresa. His godparents are Princess Marie Astrid of Luxembourg and Prince Guillaume of Luxembourg. Guillaume has four younger siblings: Prince Félix, Prince Louis, Princess Alexandra and Prince Sébastien.

Guillaume attended public school, completing his primary education in Lorentzweiler and his secondary education at the Lycée Robert-Schuman in Luxembourg City, before attending Swiss boarding schools the Institut Le Rosey and the Collège Alpin International Beau Soleil where he finished the French baccalaureate in 2001; and Royal Military Academy Sandhurst, Camberley, England. He began his higher education studies in the United Kingdom where he studied at University College, Durham and Brunel University, both in England. In 2006 he entered the Institut Philanthropos in Fribourg, Switzerland, where he spent a year studying philosophy and anthropology. He later studied letters and political science at the Institut Albert-le-Grand in Angers, receiving his bachelor's degree with honors in 2009. His degree was issued by the University of Angers, as a result of a partnership agreement between the two schools. From 2018 until 2019, Prince Guillaume attended a postgraduate training at the Royal College of Defence Studies (RCDS) in London.

The then-Hereditary Grand Duke completed internships at the Belgian Chemical Union in 2003, at the Deutsche Bank in London in 2004, and at the Spanish branch of ArcelorMittal in 2005. Sworn in December 2002 as an officer in the Luxembourg Army, Guillaume held the rank of colonel until his accession to the throne, upon which he was promoted to General and Commander of the Army.

== Hereditary Grand Duke ==
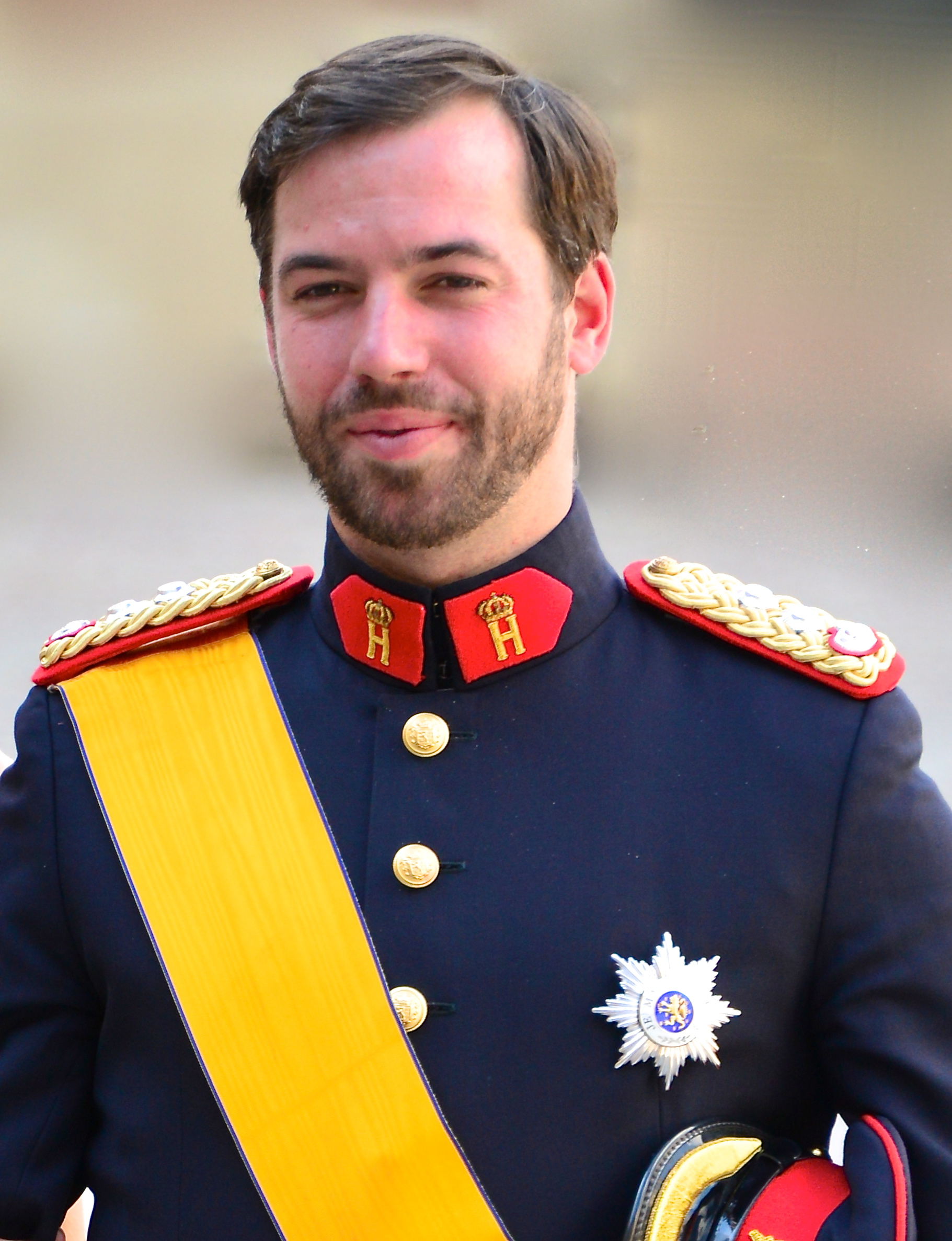
Guillaume as Hereditary Grand Duke in 2013

Guillaume was heir apparent to the crown of Luxembourg from his father's accession in 2000 until 2025, when he became Grand Duke following Henri's abdication.

Guillaume became the honorary chairman of the Board of Economic Development of the Grand Duchy of Luxembourg, an agency for economic promotion and development, in March 2001. He has also been a member of the Council of State since 24 June 2005. He attended the Millennium Conference at the United Nations headquarters in New York City in 2005. Guillaume also worked at the European Commission and the Permanent Representation of Luxembourg to the European Union in Brussels in 2012.

Guillaume is patron of the Luxembourg Cycling Sport Federation, Youth Hostels Central, National Association of Road Victims, Chamber Orchestra of Luxembourg, Youth Harmony Orchestra of the European Union, as well as to Young Entrepreneurs Luxembourg and Special Olympics Luxembourg Associations.

During the summer of 1997, Guillaume participated as a member of Luxembourg Scout Movement in a humanitarian camp in Nepal. He was involved in a reforestation project and other actions for the benefit of less fortunate communities. In 2017, he joined the board of directors of the World Scout Foundation to support the development of scouting around the world.

In 1999, he participated in a charitable mission in Aguascalientes to provide the educational and social assistance to young people in one of the most deprived areas in Mexico. After having chaired the Kräizbierg Foundation, which works for people with disabilities, for more than 10 years (2000–2011), he accepted the title of honorary president in March 2011.

During the 2001–2002 academic year, the Hereditary Grand Duke completed officer training at the Royal Military Academy Sandhurst in the United Kingdom. Following the completion of his training, he was commissioned as a lieutenant in the Luxembourg Army by grand-ducal decree of 25 July 2002. In December of that year, he took the officer's oath of the Luxembourg Army at the Military Centre in Diekirch, in the presence of his family and national authorities. He is also a Knight of the Order of the Golden Lion of Nassau.

After completing his military training, he pursued higher education in international politics in the United Kingdom, at the prestigious University College in Durham, as well as in Switzerland. He subsequently attended the Institut Albert-le-Grand in Angers, France, completing a bachelor's degree in Humanities and Political Science at IRCOM. He also undertook internships in 2003 at Union Chimique Belge and in 2004 at Deutsche Bank in London.

From 10 June 2005 until his appointment as lieutenant-representative in 2024, Prince Guillaume served as a member of Luxembourg's Council of State, thereby gaining direct exposure to the country's political life. In the sporting domain, he granted his high patronage to the Luxembourg Cycling Sports Federation.

On the occasion of his 25th birthday in 2006, Luxembourg issued a commemorative €2 coin bearing his effigy alongside that of his father.

In September 2018, the Hereditary Grand Duke and his wife took up residence in London. There, Guillaume pursued postgraduate studies at the Royal College of Defence Studies. Founded in 1927, the institution welcomes around one hundred participants annually from more than 50 countries, offering courses in international relations, geopolitics, and strategic management for future high-level leaders. During this period, Princess Stéphanie enrolled in an art history program at the Sotheby's Institute of Art.

He is furthermore regarded by French legitimists as thirty-fourth in the line of succession to the throne of France.

Since 18 January 2016, Guillaume has been a member of the board of directors of Europäische Stiftung Kaiserdom zu Speyer Foundation. He is also a member of the board of directors of the Fondation du Grand-Duc et de la Grande-Duchesse.

On 23 June 2024, during the celebrations of Luxembourg's National Day, Grand Duke Henri announced that he would appoint Prince Guillaume as lieutenant-representative in October, marking the first stage in the transfer of grand-ducal powers and preparing the way for the monarch's abdication. The investiture ceremony took place on 8 October at the Grand Ducal Palace, followed by proceedings at the Chamber of Deputies. On 24 December, in his annual Christmas address, the Grand Duke announced that his abdication and the transfer of power to Guillaume would take place on 3 October 2025.

=== Marriage and fatherhood ===
On interviews for his 30th birthday, he stated that he was in a relationship with a "dear miss" that had been going strong for more than a year but needed more time to evaluate their possible future. On 26 April 2012, the court announced the engagement of the Hereditary Grand Duke to the Belgian Countess Stéphanie de Lannoy. The civil wedding took place on 19 October 2012; the religious wedding took place on 20 October 2012, at the Notre-Dame Cathedral. In 2026, the wedding resurfaced in the controversy involving the relationship of Mette-Marit, Crown Princess of Norway, and Jeffrey Epstein, after media reports highlighted a remark in which Mette-Marit told Epstein that the wedding was boring her to death.

Guillaume and Stéphanie have two sons, who are first and second in the line of succession to the throne of Luxembourg:

- Charles Jean Philippe Joseph Marie Guillaume (born 10 May 2020)
- François Henri Louis Marie Guillaume (born 27 March 2023)

== Reign ==
On 8 October 2024, as had been announced by Grand Duke Henri on his Official Birthday that year, Guillaume was appointed as lieutenant-representative (regent). Under this capacity, he assumed a number of his father's constitutional powers, such as the swearing in of ambassadors and the signing of Grand Ducal Decrees. This is traditionally the first step in the abdication process in Luxembourg, as both Jean (1961–1964) and Henri (1998–2000) have previously served in the position. On 24 December 2024, during his Christmas message, Henri announced that the abdication would take place on 3 October 2025.

Guillaume acceded to the throne on that date, becoming Grand Duke of Luxembourg. He chose as his regnal name Guillaume V, thus emphasising the previous four Luxembourgish Grand Dukes named Guillaume (or William in English): Guillaume I, Guillaume II, Guillaume III, and Guillaume IV.

On 23 January 2026, in an audience at the Vatican, he met with Pope Leo XIV, along with his wife, Grand Duchess Stéphanie. During the meeting, they emphasized the excellent relations between Luxembourg and the Holy See, accompanied by their sons, Princes Charles and François, marking the couple's first official visit since the succession to the Grand Duchy on 3 October 2025.

== Titles and honours ==
=== Honours ===
==== National honours ====
- Co-Grand Master (since 3 October 2025) and Knight of the Order of the Gold Lion of the House of Nassau (7 October 2000)
- Grand Master (since 3 October 2025) and Grand Cross of the Order of Adolphe of Nassau (11 November 1981) (Note: Princes and Princesses of the Grand-Ducal House of Luxembourg are Grand Crosses of the Order by birth but the decoration is worn only after they reach their majority (18 years old))
- Grand Master (since 3 October 2025) and Grand Cross of the Order of the Oak Crown (23 June 2012)
- Grand Master of the Order of Merit of the Grand Duchy of Luxembourg (3 October 2025)

==== Foreign honours ====
- Belgium:
- Grand Cordon of the Order of Leopold (23 October 2025)
- Grand Cross of the Order of the Crown (15 October 2019)
- Finland: Grand Cross with Collar of the Order of the White Rose of Finland (29 September 2026)
- France: Grand Officer of the Order of the Legion of Honour (5 March 2015)
- Italy: Knight Grand Cross of the Order of Merit of the Italian Republic (30 January 2009)
- Netherlands:
  - Knight Grand Cross of the Order of Orange-Nassau (21 March 2012)
  - Recipient of the King Willem-Alexander Inauguration Medal (30 April 2013)
- Portugal: Grand Cross of the Order of Aviz (23 May 2017)
- Senegal: Commander of the National Order of the Lion (24 February 2013)
- Slovakia: Grand Officer of the Order of the White Double Cross (7 September 2005)
- Spain: Knight of the Collar of the Royal Order of Isabella the Catholic (5 March 2026)
- United Kingdom: Recipient of the Sandhurst Medal (22 September 2020)

=== Awards ===
- World Organization of the Scout Movement: Bronze Wolf Award (21 March 2024).

== See also ==
- Grand Duke of Luxembourg
- Grand Ducal Family of Luxembourg – Reigning family of Luxembourg

Guillaume V of Luxembourg House of Luxembourg-Nassau Cadet branch of the House of Nassau Born: 11 November 1981
Regnal titles
Preceded by Henri	Grand Duke of Luxembourg; 2025–present	Incumbent; Heir apparent: Prince Charles of Luxembourg
Titles in pretence
Preceded by Henri	— TITULAR — Duke of Nassau; 2025–present Reason for succession failure: Prussian annexation of Nassau in 1866	Incumbent
