= Charles de Ligne, 2nd Prince of Arenberg =

Flemish courtier, soldier, minister and diplomat

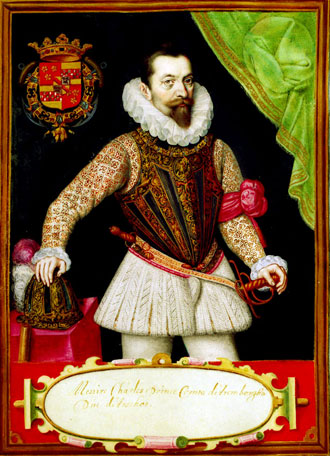
Charles, Princely Count of Arenberg

Charles of Arenberg, Duke of Aarschot (jure uxoris), Baron of Zevenbergen, Knight of the Order of the Golden Fleece (22 February 1550, in Vollenhove – 18 January 1616, in Enghien), was Princely Count of Arenberg and a leading nobleman of the Habsburg Netherlands. He served as a courtier, soldier, minister and diplomat.

== Background and early years ==
He was the eldest son of Jean de Ligne and Margaretha von der Mark, Countess of Arenberg. As his mother was the sister and sole heiress of Robert III von der Marck-Arenberg, the marriage contract of his parents stipulated that he would bear the title, name and arms of Arenberg. On 5 March 1576, Emperor Maximilian II raised his mother and her heirs to the rank of Princely Counts, thereby promoting them to the Council of Princes of the Imperial Diet. Apart from the immediate princely county of Arenberg, the family owned extensive properties in the duchy of Brabant (the lordships of Vorselaar, Loenhout and Humbeek), the duchy of Luxembourg (the lordship of Mirwart and half of Neufchâteau) and the county of Holland (the barony of Zevenbergen, the Free Lordship of Zuid-Polsbroek and the lordships of Terschelling and Naaldwijk).

At the age of ten, Charles of Arenberg was sent to the court of Albert V of Bavaria, where he remained for three years. In 1566 he set out on a grand tour, visiting Paris, Lyon, Venice, Rome, Naples, Palermo, Malta, Florence and Strasbourg and studying law at the University of Bologna. He returned to the Netherlands shortly after the outbreak of the Dutch Revolt and the death of his father in the battle of Heiligerlee. His mother wanted him to stay neutral in the revolt and used her influence to have him sent on diplomatic missions. In 1570 he joined Archduchess Anna of Austria and her two brothers, the Archdukes Albert and Wenceslaus on their journey to the court of Philip II. From there, the king sent him on a mission to Charles IX of France to salute the birth of Marie Elisabeth of Valois. On his way back from a pilgrimage (1573) to Rome and Loreto, Charles of Arenberg accompanied the widowed Elisabeth of Austria from Nancy to the Imperial Court in Vienna (1575–1576). During his stay in Vienna Arenberg was raised to a princely county. In the meantime, the rebellious States of Holland had confiscated his estates in 1572. After a brief restitution in 1577, they were once again seized in 1579. In the process these properties suffered considerable damage.

== In service of the House of Habsburg ==
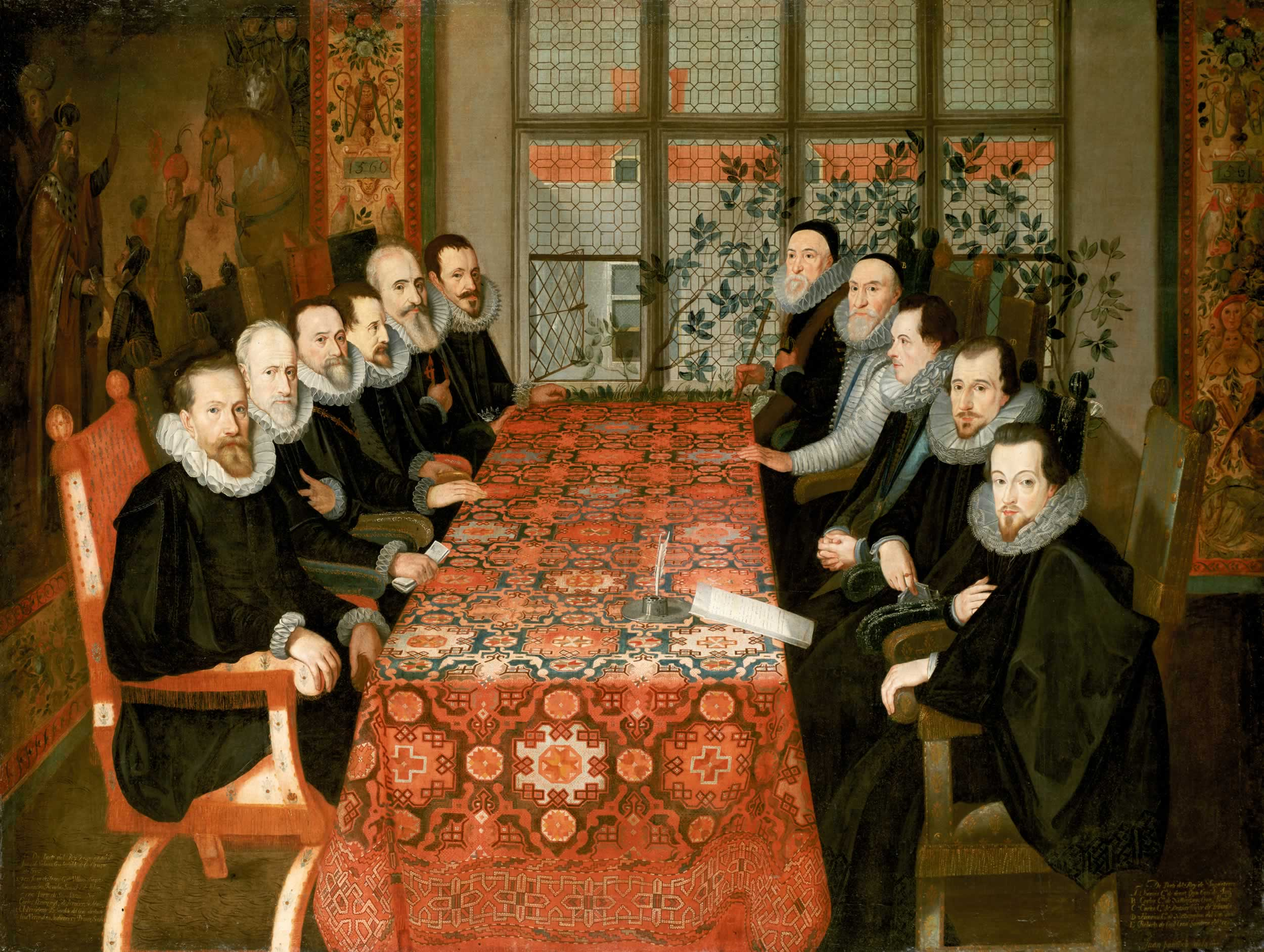
Princely Count Charles of Arenberg at the Somerset House Conference (third on the left)

In August 1581, Alexander Farnese appointed Charles of Arenberg colonel of a regiment of German cavalry. He saw action during the Cologne War (1582–1584), notably in the Siege of Godesberg (1583), participated in the sieges of Antwerp (1585) and of Sluis (1587) and joined Farnese's campaign in France (1590).

In 1582 marriage between him and Sibylle of Julich-Kleve-Berg, aunt of Rudolf II, Holy Roman Emperor and cousin of Philip II of Spain was promoted by Arenbergs mother Marguerite.The marriage never came into fruition because of the class differences between the two houses and the difficult political situation.

On 27 April 1586, Charles of Arenberg was awarded the Order of the Golden Fleece. In the same year, he made his entry in the Collateral Councils that advised the governor-general. Philip II appointed him a member of the Council of State and one of the heads of the Council of Finance. The following year, he was among the delegation that met with the envoys of Queen Elizabeth I at Bourbourg in 1587, in a feigned attempt to end hostilities between England and Spain. At the accession of the Archdukes Albert and Isabella, Arenberg saw his loyalty to the House of Habsburg rewarded. He was maintained as a member of the Council of State (1598) and was appointed a gentleman of the archducal Bedchamber (1599), lieutenant-general and admiral of the Netherlands and president of the Council of Admiralty (1599) and finally grand falconer of the Netherlands (1600).

For the next few years, Charles of Arenberg acted as the Archduke's most prestigious ambassador. In 1598 he was among the delegation that went to Paris to witness the ratification of the Treaty of Vervins by Henry IV of France. He returned to the French Court two years later, to congratulate the king on his marriage with Marie de' Medici. In June 1603 Charles of Arenberg was sent on an embassy to congratulate King James VI and I upon his accession to the English throne. On 4 October he had an audience with Anne of Denmark. The mission was meant to pave the way for an end to the Anglo-Spanish War, but almost backfired when Arenberg was wrongfully accused of involvement in the Main and Bye Plots.

In the summer of 1604, he headed the archducal delegation that negotiated the Treaty of London. He visited Theobalds and Wanstead House. During his time in London he suffered from gout. At his departure, Anne of Denmark gave him a jewel with her initials, "A.R".

Increasingly suffering from gout, Charles of Arenberg thereafter withdrew from active politics. In 1607 he and his wife bought the domain at Enghien from Henry IV of France. He recuperated the expense by selling off the Dutch possessions that had been restored to him by the Twelve Years' Truce. The lordships of Naaldwijk and Terschelling were among the goods that were sold. In order to make Enghien their principal seat, the Arenbergs rebuilt the castle and made many improvements to the gardens, with Robert Cecil's gardens at Theobalds House allegedly serving as an example. In the town of Enghien they founded a Capuchin monastery that would henceforth serve as the dynasty's necropolis.

== Marriage and descendants ==
Charles of Arenberg was the founder of the third and present House of Arenberg. On 4 January 1587 he married Anne de Croÿ, the eldest daughter of Philippe III de Croÿ, 3rd duke of Aarschot. When his brother-in-law, Charles III of Croÿ, 5th Prince of Chimay, 4th duke of Aarschot, died without issue in 1612, most of his titles and estates passed to Anne and her descendants. They had 12 children: Most of the current high nobility of Belgium descends from him, his descendance contains major noble families.

Charles de Ligne, 2nd Prince of Arenberg
married to Anne de Croÿ

  1. Philippe Charles of Arenberg, 6th duke of Aarschot (Barbançon 18 October 1587 – Madrid 25 September 1640):
    Married to Isabelle Claire de Berlaymont.
    1. Philippe François, 1st Duke of Arenberg:
      married to Magdalena de Borja y Doria.
    2. Charles Eugene, 2nd Duke of Arenberg:
      Married to Marie-Henriette de Cusance, marquise de Varambon.
      1. Philippe-Charles, 3rd duke of Arenberg
        1. Léopold-Philippe, 4th Duke of Arenberg
          1. Charles Marie Raymond, 5th Duke of Arenberg
            1. Louis Engelbert, 6th Duke of Arenberg
            2. Marie-Flore d'Arenberg:
              married to Wolfgang-William, 3rd Duke d'Ursel.
              1. Charles-Joseph, 4th Duke d'Ursel
  2. Charles of Arenberg (Barbançon 13 November 1588 – Rome 21 April 1613):
    canon of the cathedral chapter of St Lambert in Liège, provost of Sainte-Waudru in Mons.
  3. Ernestine of Arenberg (Brussels 31 October 1589 – Abbeville 12 June 1653):
    married to Guillaume III de Melun, Prince of Espinoy.
    1. Alexandre-Guillaume de Melun:
      married 2nd to Jeanne Pélagie de Rohan-Chabot
      1. Louis I de Melun, Prince of Epinoy: married to Élisabeth Thérèse de Lorraine
    2. Anne de Melun
    3. Louise-Eugenie de Melun, married to Maximilien III Emmanuel de la Woestyne, 1st Marquess of Becelaere.
  4. Alexander of Arenberg, prince of Chimay (Brussels 15 December 1590 – Wesel 16 August 1629):
    married to Madeleine of Egmont
    1. Anne-Caroline, Princesse of Arenberg and Chimay;
      Married to Eugène de Hénin, 6th Count of Bossu.
      1. Philippe de Hénin, 7th Count of Bossu and Prince of Chimay
        1. Thomas de Hénin, Cardinal d'Alsace
  5. Salentin of Arenberg (Brussels 16 December 1591 – Brussels 15 August 1592).
  6. Antoine of Arenberg (Brussels 21 February 1593 – Brussels 5 June 1669):
    became a Capuchin friar under the name of Charles of Brussels.
  7. Claire of Arenberg (Brussels 20 August 1594 – Brussels 1670):
    married 1st to Bertin Spinola, count of Bruay and 2nd Ottavio Visconti, count of Gamalero.
  8. Alexandrine-Albertine of Arenberg (Brussels 28 May 1596 – Brussels 19 July 1652):
    married Herman Philippe de Merode, Marquess of Trelong.
    1. Albert de Merode, Marquess of Trelong: married to Marie-Célestine de Raye
      1. Claude-François de Merode, Marquess of Trelong
    2. Philippe-Antoine de de Merode, Count of Bocarmé.
    3. Alexandre de Merode, Baron of Haeren
  9. NN (stillborn, Brussels 16 July 1597).
  10. Eugene of Arenberg (Brussels 12 July 1600 – Zaragoza 18 September 1635):
    became a Capuchin friar under the name of Desiré of Brussels.
  11. Dorothée of Arenberg (Ghent 26 November 1601 – 1655):
    married Philippe, count of Hornes.
    1. Philippe-Eugène of Hornes: Married to Eleonore de Merode
    2. Albert of Hornes: Bishop of Ghent.
    3. Françoise-Eugène of Hornes:
      Married to Lamoral II Claudius Franz, Count of Thurn and Taxis
      1. Eugen Alexander Franz, 1st Prince of Thurn and Taxis: married to Anna-Adelheid of Fürstenberg-Heiligenberg.
        1. Anselm Franz, 2nd Prince of Thurn and Taxis:married to Maria-Ludovika, Princess of Lobkowicz
          1. Alexander Ferdinand, 3rd Prince of Thurn and Taxis
  12. Caroline Ernestine of Arenberg (Brussels 6 September 1606 – Enghien 12 September 1630)
    married her cousin Count Ernst von Isenburg-Grenzau.

== Sources ==
- d'Arenberg, Jean-Engelbert (1951). Les princes du St-Empire à l'époque napoléonienne. Publications universitaires de Louvain.
- Tytgat, Jean-Pierre (1994). "Karel, prins en graaf van Arenberg, hertog van Aarschot, baron van Zevenbergen, heer van Edingen, 1550-1616". Een stad en een geslacht: Edingen en Arenberg, 1607-1635. Gemeentekrediet. pp. 7–20. ISBN 9050661343.
- Allen, Paul C. (2000). Philip III and the Pax Hispanica, 1598-1621: The Failure of Grand Strategy. Yale University Press. ISBN 0300076827.
- Derez, Mark a.o. (2002). Arenberg in de Lage Landen: Een hoogadellijk huis in Vlaanderen en Nederland. Universitaire Pers Leuven. ISBN 9058672336.

== Notes ==
Preceded by Jean de Ligne, Duke of Aremberg	Free Lord of Zuid-Polsbroek; 1568–1610	Succeeded by Jacob Dircksz de Graeff
