= Arenberg =

Former duchy in Europe

Coordinates: 50.8633°N 4.6832°E

County (Duchy) of Arenberg Grafschaft (Herzogtum) Arenberg (German)
- 1549–1810
- Flag Coat of arms

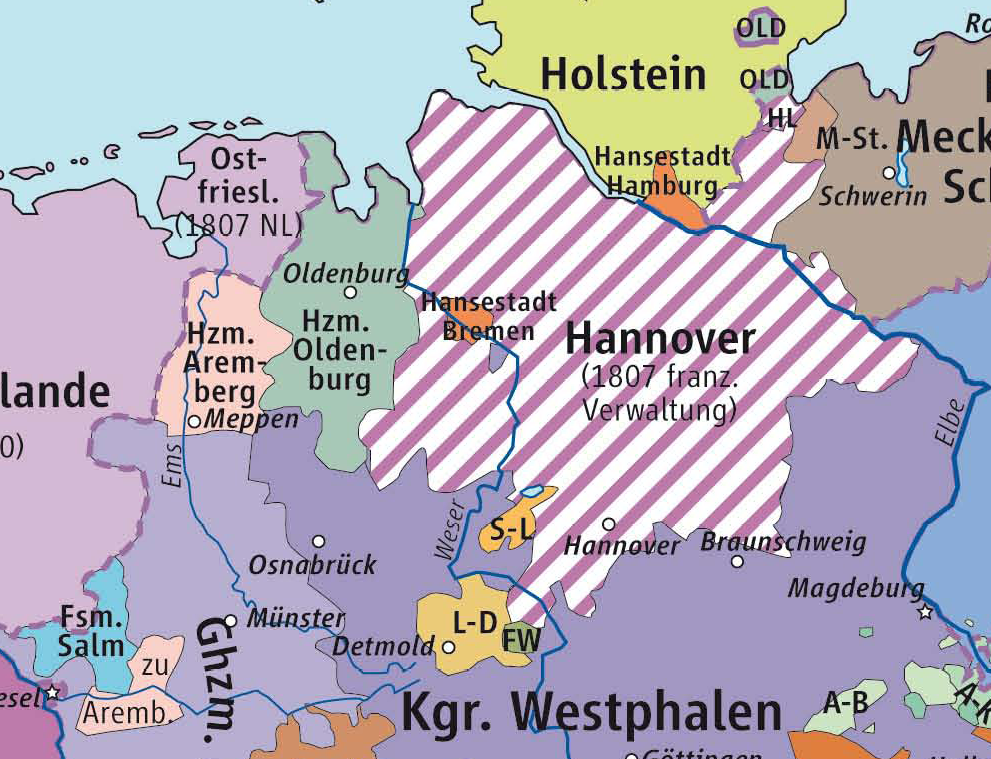
- The Duchy of Arenberg in 1807 after the Napoleonic relocation
- Status: State of the Holy Roman Empire, then State of the Confederation of the Rhine
- Capital: Aremberg
- Common languages: Moselle Franconian
- Government: Principality
- Historical era: Middle Ages; Early modern period
  - County established: c. 1117
  - Gained Reichsfreiheit: 1549
  - Raised to Princely county: 1576
  - Joined Council of Princes: 1580
  - Raised to Duchy: 1645
  - Joined Confederation of the Rhine: 1806
  - Mediatized to French Empire and Berg: 1810
  - Territories assigned to Hanover and Prussia: 1815
Preceded by
Prince-Bishopric of Münster
Succeeded by
Kingdom of Hanover
Kingdom of Prussia
First French Empire
Grand Duchy of Berg

Arenberg, also spelled as Aremberg or Ahremberg, is a former county, principality and finally duchy that was located in what is now Germany. The Dukes of Arenberg remain a prominent Belgian noble family.

== History ==
First mentioned in the 12th century, it was named after the village of Aremberg in the Ahr Hills, located in today's Rhineland-Palatinate region of Germany.

=== 1549–1645 ===
Aremberg was originally a county. It became an immediate (reichsunmittelbar) state of the Holy Roman Empire in 1549, was raised to a princely county in 1576, then became a duchy in 1645.

=== 1789 ===
The territorial possessions of the Dukes of Arenberg varied through the ages. Around 1789, the duchy was located in the Eifel region on the west side of the Rhine and contained, amongst others, Aremberg, Schleiden and Kerpen.

However, although the duchy itself was in Germany, from the 15th century onward, the principal lands of the Dukes of Arenberg have been in what is now Belgium.

The pre-Napoleonic duchy had an area of 413 km^{2} (159 sq mi) and a population of 14,800. It belonged to the Electoral Rhenish Circle and was bordered by the Duchy of Jülich, the Electorate of Cologne, the Electorate of Trier, and the County of Blankenheim.

=== 1798 ===
After the French occupation of the west bank of the Rhine around 1798 (see Treaty of Campo Formio and Treaty of Lunéville), the Duke of Arenberg received in 1803 new lands: the county of Vest Recklinghausen, the county of Meppen, and later the lordship of Dülmen.

=== 1810 ===
Arenberg joined Napoleon's Confederation of the Rhine, although that did not prevent it from being mediatised in 1810, with France annexing Dülmen and Meppen, and the Grand Duchy of Berg annexing Recklinghausen.

=== 1814 ===
After Napoleon's defeat in 1814 and the dissolution of the Confederation of the Rhine, the former Arenberg territories were divided between the Kingdom of Prussia and the Kingdom of Hanover. In both Prussia and Hanover, the dukes became local peers subordinate to the king.

=== 1826 ===
In 1826, the Arenberg territory in Hanover was named the duchy of Arenberg-Meppen, and it had an area of 2,195 km^{2} (847 sq mi) and a population of 56,700. The county of Recklinghausen, in Prussia, had an area of 780 km^{2} (300 sq mi) and a population of 64,700.

The Dukes of Arenberg remain a prominent Belgian aristocratic family. The immediate family members of the dukes are called by the nominal title of Prince of Arenberg. The ducal family descends agnatically from the House of Ligne.

The Forest of Arenberg is located in northeastern France, and it is famous for its cobbled roads used in the classic road cycle race Paris–Roubaix. Its areas saw extensive mining in the past.

== Counts, Princely Counts and Dukes ==
=== Counts of Arenberg (1117–1576) ===
- Franko (1117–1129)
- Henry I (1129–1187)
- Eberhard I (1188–1202)
- Eberhard II (1202–1229)
- Henry II (1220–1250)
- Gerard (1252–1260)
- John I (1260–1279)
- Mathilde (1282–1299)
- Eberhard III (Count of Marck) (1282–1308)
- Engelbert (1308–1328)
- Eberhard I (1328–1387)
- Eberhard II (1387–1454)

Partition into Arenberg and Rochefort

- John II (1454–1480)
- Eberhard III (1480–1496)
- Robert I (1496–?)
- Robert II (?–1536)
- Robert III (1536–1541)
- Margaret (1541–1576)
- John III (1547–1568, as co-ruler with his wife Margaret)
- Charles (1568–1576)

=== Princely Counts of Arenberg (1576–1645) ===
- Margaret (1576–1599)
- Charles (1576–1616)
- Philip Charles (1616–1640)
- Philip Francis (1640–1645)

=== Dukes of Arenberg (1645–1810) ===
- Philip Francis, 1st Duke of Arenberg (1645–1675)
- Charles Eugene, 2nd Duke of Arenberg (1675–1681)
- Philip Charles Francis, 3rd Duke of Arenberg (1681–1691)
- Leopold, 4th Duke of Arenberg (1691–1754)
- Charles Marie Raymond, 5th Duke of Arenberg (1754–1778)
- Louis Engelbert, 6th Duke of Arenberg (1778–1803)
- Prosper Louis, 7th Duke of Arenberg (1803–1810)

Mediatised in 1810

== See also ==
- Arenberg-Nordkirchen
- Arenberg Research-Park

== Sources ==
- Official site of the House of Arenberg
- The dukes of Arenberg
- Meyers Konversationslexikon
