= Duke of Aarschot =

Noble title in the Low Countries

The Duke of Aarschot (or Aerschot) was one of the most important aristocratic titles in the Low Countries, named after the Brabantian city of Aarschot. The title was held by the House of Croÿ and the House of Arenberg. The present Duke is Leopold-Engelbert-Evrard de Arenberg-Ligne.

== Lords of Aarschot ==
- Godfried of Brabant (12??-1302), Lord of Aarschot, killed in the Battle of the Golden Spurs.
- Margaretha of Lorraine-Vaudémont (1420–1477), Lady of Aarschot. Married to Antoine de Croy, Comte de Porcéan.
- Philip I of Croy (1435–1511), 2nd count of Porcéan, 2nd count of Guînes and Lord of Aarschot.
- Henry de Croÿ (1456–1514), 3rd count of Porcéan, count of Seneghem and lord of Aarschot

== Margrave of Aarschot ==
- William de Croÿ (1458–1521), since 1518, Count of Beaumont, Duke of Sora and Arce, and since 1521, Margrave of Aarschot.

== Dukes of Aarschot ==
=== House of Croÿ ===
- Philippe II de Croÿ (1496–1549), since 1514, Count of Porcéan, since 1521, Duke of Sora and Arce, 2nd Count of Beaumont, since 1532, Margrave of Renty, and since 1532, first Duke of Aarschot.
- Charles II de Croÿ (1522–1551), 2nd Duke of Aarschot.
- Philippe III de Croÿ (1526–1595), 3rd Duke of Aarschot.
- Charles III de Croÿ (1560–1612), 4th Duke of Aarschot.
- Anne de Croÿ, 5th Duchess of Aarschot (1568–1614), married to Charles de Ligne, 2nd Prince of Arenberg

=== House of Arenberg-Ligne ===
- Philip Charles (1587–1640), 6th Duke of Aarschot
- Philip Francis (1625–1674), 7th Duke of Aarschot
- Charles Eugene (1633–1681), 8th Duke of Aarschot
- Philip Charles Francis (1663–1691), 9th Duke of Aarschot
- Leopold (1690–1754), 10th Duke of Aarschot
- Charles Marie Raymond (1721–1778), 11th Duke of Aarschot
- Louis Engelbert (1750–1820), 12th Duke of Aarschot
- Prosper Louis (1785–1861), 13th Duke of Aarschot
- Engelbert August (1824–1875), 14th Duke of Aarschot
- Engelbert Prosper (1872–1949), 15th Duke of Aarschot
- Engelbert Charles (1899–1974), 16th Duke of Aarschot
- Erik Charles (1901–1992), 17th Duke of Aarschot
- Jean Engelbert (1921–2011), 18th Duke of Aarschot
- Leopold Engelbert (b. 1956), 19th Duke of Aarschot
