= Engelbert II of Mark =

Engelbert II of the Mark
- Coat-of-arms of La Mark
- Born: 1275
- Died: 18 January 1328
- Noble family: House of La Marck
- Spouse: Mechtilde of Arenberg
- Issue: Adolf II, Count of La Mark; Engelbert, Archbishop of Cologne
- Father: Eberhard I, Count of the Mark
- Mother: Irmgard of Berg

Engelbert II of the Mark (1275 – July 18, 1328) was Count of the Mark and through marriage, Count of Arenberg.

== Family ==
He was the son and heir of Count Eberhard II and his wife, Irmgard of Berg. On January 25, 1299, he married Mechtilde of Arenberg (died March 18, 1328), daughter of Johann of Arenberg and Katharina of Jülich. He and his wife had eight children:

- Adolf II (died 1347), Count of Mark
- Engelbert (died 1368), Archbishop of Cologne
- Eberhard (died 1387), Count of Arenberg
- Mathilde
- Irmgard (died 1360), married Otto, Lord of Lippe
- Katharina (died 1360), abbess of Essen
- Margareta
- Richardis.

The County of Mark then fell heir to his son, Adolf II of the Mark; ownership of Arenberg went to his son, Eberhard I of the Mark-Arenberg.

== Biography ==
Engelbert II succeeded his father in 1308 and continued his father's efforts to maintain authority over the County of Mark. This necessitated conflict with Bishop Ludwig II of Münster, as well as the Archbishop of Cologne, Henry II of Virneburg, who also dominated the neighboring Duchy of Westphalia. When Bishop Ludwig II marched into Hamm in 1323, he fell into Engelbert's hands and was released only after paying 5,000 silvermarks, a very high ransom.

During the dispute over the throne between Frederick the Fair and Ludwig IV, Engelbert II later allied himself temporarily with the Archbishop of Cologne, who supported Frederick. A short time later, Engelbert II switched his support to Ludwig IV, putting the Archbishop under such pressure, he was obliged to request a truce.

Count Engelbert II granted the city of Bochum its town charter at Blankenstein Castle in 1321.

Engelbert II of Mark House of La Marck Died: 18 July 1328
Preceded by Eberhard II of the Mark	Count of the Mark; 1308–1328	Succeeded by Adolf II of the Mark
Preceded by Mechtilde	Count of Arenberg jure uxoris 1299-1328	Succeeded by Eberhard I
