= Béatrix de Cusance =

Béatrix
- Baroness of Belvoir and de Saint-Julien; Princess consort de Cantecroix; Madame de Lorraine
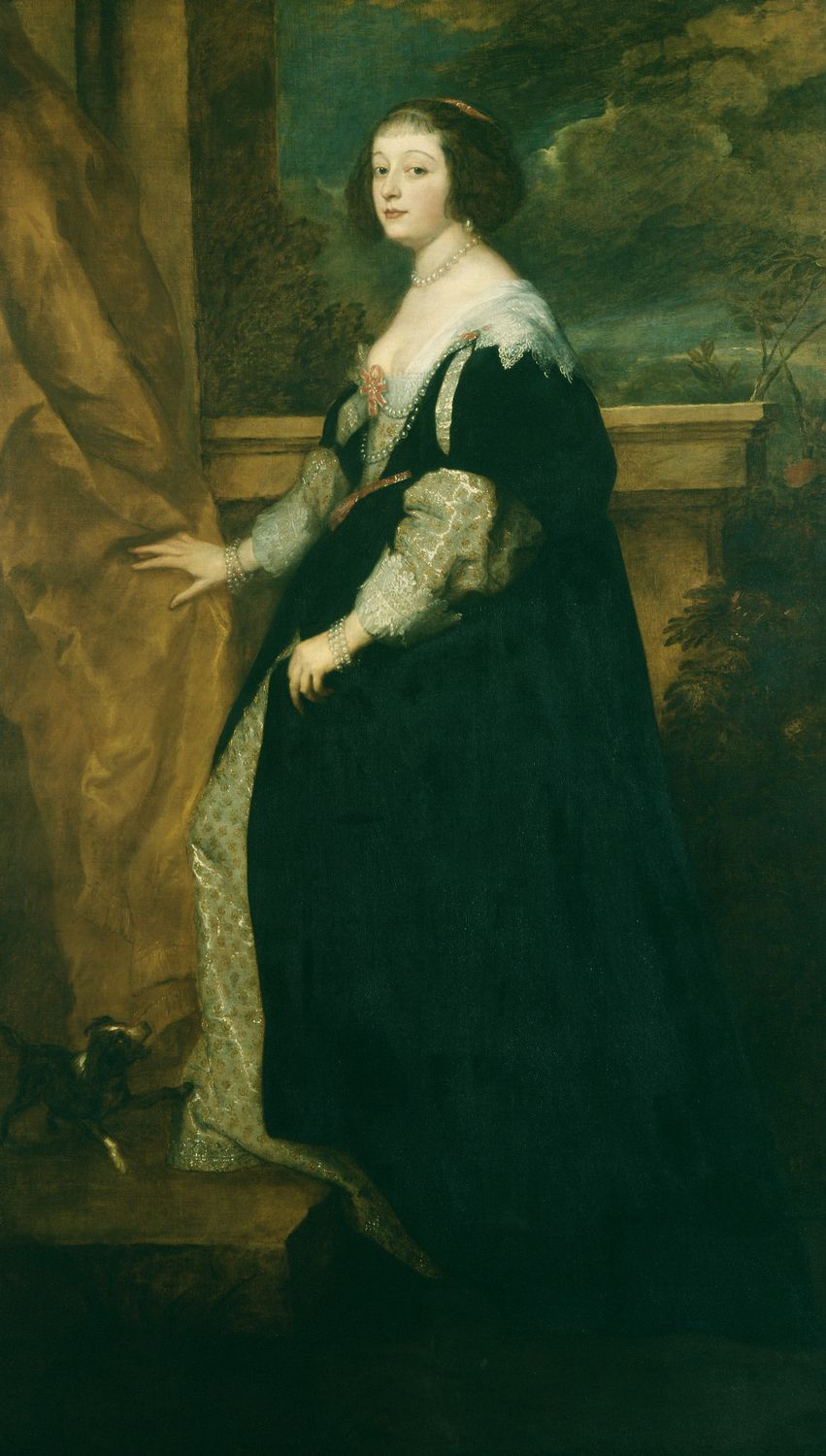
- Portrait by Anthony van Dyck, 1635
- Born: 27 December 1614; Belvoir
- Died: 5 June 1663 (aged 48); Besançon
- Spouse: Leopold-Eugène Perrenot de Granvelle, Prince de Cantecroix; Charles IV, Duke of Lorraine
Names
- Béatrix de Cusance
- House: Cusance
- Father: Claude-François de Cusance, Count of Champlitte
- Mother: Ernestine of Witthem, Comtesse de Walhain and Vicomtesse de Sébourg

Béatrix de Cusance, Baroness of Belvoir (27 December 1614 – 5 June 1663), was the second wife of Charles IV, former reigning Duke of Lorraine. She was also a correspondent of Constantijn Huygens.

== Biography ==
She was the second child and first daughter of Claude-François de Cusance, Count of Champlitte (1590–1627), Baron de Belvoir and de Saint-Julien, an officer in the Spanish Netherlands, and of Ernestine of Witthem, Comtesse de Walhain and Vicomtesse de Sébourg (before 1588–1649). She had two surviving sisters, Madeleine de Cusance, who became the wife of Albert, Count of Bergh-Heerenberg, and Marie Henreitte de Cusance, Countess of Champlitte, the wife of Charles Eugene, 2nd Duke of Arenberg.

She was raised in Besançon and at the Brussels court of Isabella Clara Eugenia, regent of the Spanish Netherlands. She inherited Belvoir and Saint-Julien after the death of her brother Cleriadus de Cusance in 1635.

=== Relationship with Charles IV ===
In 1634, she became the mistress of Charles IV, Duke of Lorraine, who was at the time in the service of Spain. To avoid a scandal, her mother arranged a marriage to Leopold-Eugène Perrenot de Granvelle, Prince of Cantecroix (1615–1637), maternal grandson of Rudolf II, Holy Roman Emperor through his extramarital daughter Caroline, Margravine of Austria (1591-1662), whom she married in 1635. On 9 April 1637, nine days after the death of her first husband, a marriage contract with Charles IV was signed. Six months after the ceremony she gave birth to a boy, whom Charles acknowledged. The boy, Joseph, died in February 1638.

Béatrix accompanied Charles on his military campaigns, wearing armour over her dress.

His marriage to Béatrix de Cusance was not deemed valid by the Roman Catholic church, which had not authorised his divorce from Nicole. The couple separated in April 1642 following his excommunication, which was the consequence of his second marriage; earlier, in 1639, Béatrix gave birth to a girl named Anne, whom Charles recognized. Although the excommunication was lifted in 1645, the couple was ordered to remain separated until the matter was solved by the Catholic church.

=== Later life ===
Béatrix lived in Brussels, where she hosted a salon and arranged concerts as one of the city's leading social figures. In 1652, she became acquainted with Constantijn Huygens, who dedicated to her some of his work and with whom she corresponded. In 1652–1660, she lived in several places in the Spanish Netherlands. She is described as a witty beauty, and Pope Alexander VII referred to her as the most beautiful woman of the century.

In 1654, Charles IV was imprisoned in Spain. When he returned to Lorraine in 1659, Béatrix left the Netherlands to join him. However, he did not wish to see her and they did not resume their relationship.

More than 20 years after their separation, on 20 May 1663, Charles married Béatrix de Cusance a second time, to allow legitimation of their children. She died two weeks after this second marriage.

On 4 November 1665 in Nancy, Charles married a fourth time at the age of 61. The bride was Countess Marie Louise of Aspremont-Lynden (1652–1692), the eighteen-year-old daughter of Charles of Aspremont-Lynden, Count of Reckheim (1590-1671), and his wife, Marie Françoise de Mailly (1625-1702). They had no children and in 1679, as a widow, she married Count Heinrich Franz von Mansfeld, Prince of Fondi, member of the House of Mansfeld, by whom she had two daughters.

== Issue ==
Issue by her first marriage to Eugene Leopold Perrenot de Granvelle dit d'Oiselet, 2nd Prince of Cantecroix (1615–1637):

- Béatrix de Granvelle dit d'Oiselet (1636 - died in infancy).
- François Perrenot de Granvelle dit d'Oiselet (1638-1639)

Issue by her second, legitimated marriage to Charles III, Duke of Lorraine:

- Joseph de Lorraine (October 1637 - February 1638).
- Anne de Lorraine (23 August 1639 - 19 February 1720), married her cousin François Marie de Lorraine-Elbeuf, Prince de Lillebonne (1624-1694) in 1660, had issue;
- Charles Henri de Lorraine (17 April 1649 - 14 January 1723), Prince de Vaudémont and Commercy, married his cousin, Princess Anna Elisabeth of Lorraine-Elbeuf (1649-1714), daughter of Charles III of Lorraine, Duke of Elbeuf, had issue.

== References and notes ==
- Bronvermelding: Ineke Huysman, Cusance, Béatrix-Marie-Françoise de, in: Digitaal Vrouwenlexicon van Nederland. URL: http://resources.huygens.knaw.nl/vrouwenlexicon/lemmata/data/Cusance [13/01/2014]

Preceded by Claude Françoise de Lorraine	Duchess of Lorraine; 1661–1663	Succeeded by Marie Louise d'Aspremont
