= Charles Eugene =

Charles Eugene may refer to:

- Charles Eugene, 2nd Duke of Arenberg (1633–1681)
- Charles Eugene, Duke of Württemberg (1728–1793)
- Charles Eugene, Prince of Lambesc (1751–1825)
