= List of Imperial Diet participants (1792) =

The Holy Roman Empire was a highly decentralized state for most of its history, composed of hundreds of smaller states, most of which operated with some degree of independent sovereignty. Although in the earlier part of the Middle Ages, under the Salian and Hohenstaufen emperors, it was relatively centralized, as time went on the Emperor lost more and more power to the Princes. The membership of the Imperial Diet in 1792, late in the Empire's history but before the beginning of the French Revolutionary Wars, gives some insight as to the composition of the Holy Roman Empire at that time.

== Structure of the Diet of the Holy Roman Empire in 1792 ==
The year 1792 was just before the vast changes inspired by the French Revolutionary incursions into Germany. The empire was, at that time, divided into several thousand immediate (unmittelbar) territories, but only about three hundred of these had Landeshoheit (the special sort of quasi-sovereignty enjoyed by the states of the Empire), and had representation in the Imperial Diet of the Holy Roman Empire (German Reichstag). The Imperial Diet was divided into three so-called collegia—the Council of Electors, the Council of Princes, and the Council of Cities. As those who received votes had gradually changed over the centuries, many princes held more than one vote. Certain territories which had once held votes in the Diet, as for instance the County of Waldeck or the United Duchies of Jülich-Cleves-Berg, no longer retained them, due to the extinction of a dynasty or other causes.

=== The Council of Electors ===
The council included the following eight members:

- The King of Bohemia (also Archduke of Austria and King of Hungary) (Emperor Leopold II)
- The Archbishop of Mainz (Frederick Charles Joseph of Erthal)
- The Archbishop of Trier (Clement Wenceslaus of Saxony)
- The Archbishop of Cologne (Maximilian Francis of Austria)
- The Count Palatine of the Rhine (also Duke of Bavaria) (Charles IV Theodore)
- The Duke of Saxony (Frederick Augustus III)
- The Margrave of Brandenburg (King of Prussia) (Frederick William II)
- The Duke of Brunswick-Lüneburg (Elector of Hanover, King of Great Britain) (George III)

=== The Council of Princes ===
This is ordered based on the official order of voting in the Diet:

- The Archduke of Austria (also King of Bohemia) (Emperor Leopold II)
- The Duke of Burgundy (also Archduke of Austria) (Emperor Leopold II) (Note: This was the vote exercised by the Spanish Habsburgs prior to 1714. The Duchy of Burgundy was a part of France and the Habsburgs had relinquished it definitively in 1529, but the ducal title was retained. It corresponded to the Austrian Netherlands. Cf. Gordon E. Sherman (1915), "The Permanent Neutrality Treaties", The Yale Law Journal, 24(3): 234.)

==== The Ecclesiastical Bench ====
- The Archbishop of Salzburg (Hieronymus von Colloredo)
- The Archbishop of Besançon (vacant seat)
- The Grand Master of the Teutonic Order (Maximilian Franz of Austria, the Elector of Cologne)
- The Bishop of Bamberg (Franz Ludwig von Erthal, also Prince-Bishop of Würzburg)
- The Bishop of Würzburg (Franz Ludwig von Erthal, also Prince-Bishop of Bamberg)
- The Bishop of Worms (Friedrich Karl Joseph von Erthal, the Elector of Mainz)
- The Bishop of Eichstätt (Joseph von Stubenberg)
- The Bishop of Speyer (August Philip of Limburg Stirum)
- The Bishop of Strassburg (Louis-René-Edouard de Rohan-Guéménée)
- The Bishop of Constance (Maximilian Christof von Rodt)
- The Bishop of Augsburg (Clemens Wenzeslaus of Saxony, the Elector of Trier)
- The Bishop of Hildesheim (Franz Egon von Fürstenberg, also Prince-Bishop of Paderborn)
- The Bishop of Paderborn (Franz Egon von Fürstenberg, also Prince-Bishop of Hildesheim)
- The Bishop of Freising (Joseph Konrad von Schroffenberg-Mös, also Prince-Bishop of Regensburg)
- The Bishop of Regensburg (Joseph Konrad von Schroffenberg-Mös, also Prince-Bishop of Freising)
- The Bishop of Passau (Joseph Franz Anton von Auersperg)
- The Bishop of Trent (Peter Michael Vigilius von Thun-Hohenstein)
- The Bishop of Brixen (Karl Franz von Lodron)
- The Bishop of Basel (Franz Joseph Sigismund von Roggenbach)
- The Bishop of Münster (Maximilian Francis of Austria, the Elector of Cologne)
- The Bishop of Osnabrück (notable as, after 1648, it alternated between Protestant and Roman Catholic incumbents) (Frederick Augustus of Brunswick-Lüneburg)
- The Bishop of Liège (Prince-Bishop César-Constantin-François de Hoensbroeck)
- The Bishop of Lübeck (a Protestant bishopric) (Peter Friedrich Ludwig of Holstein-Gottorp)
- The Bishop of Chur (Franz Dionysius von Rost)
- The Bishop of Fulda (Adalbert von Harstall)
- The Abbot of Kempten (Ruprecht von Neuenstein)
- The Provost of Ellwangen (Clemens Wenzeslaus of Saxony, the Elector of Trier)
- The Grand Master of the Order of St. John (Emmanuel de Rohan-Polduc)
- The Provost of Berchtesgaden (Joseph Konrad von Schroffenberg-Mös, the Prince-Bishop of Freising and Regensburg)
- The Provost of Weissenburg (August Philip of Limburg Stirum, the Prince-Bishop of Speyer)
- The Abbot of Prüm (Clemens Wenzeslaus of Saxony, the Elector of Trier)
- The Abbot of Stablo (Célestin Thys)
- The Abbot of Corvey (Theodor von Brabeck)
- A single vote for the College of the Prelates of Swabia; see below
- A single vote for the College of the Prelates of the Rhine; see below

These last two were groups of lesser abbots, who together had a joint vote. Unlike those who had a full vote, they were not considered fully sovereign.

==== The Secular Bench ====
- The Duke of Bavaria (Charles Theodore, also Elector Palatine)
- The Duke of Magdeburg (Frederick William II, also King of Prussia)
- The Count Palatine of Kaiserslautern (Charles Theodore, also Elector Palatine)
- The Count Palatine of Simmern (Charles Theodore, also Elector Palatine)
- The Count Palatine of Neuburg (Charles Theodore, also Elector Palatine)
- The Duke of Bremen (George III, also King of Great Britain and Ireland and Elector of Hanover)
- The Duke of Zweibrücken (Carl II August)
- The Count Palatine of Veldenz (Charles Theodore, also Elector Palatine)
- The Duke of Saxe-Weimar (Carl August, also Duke of Saxe-Eisenach)
- The Duke of Saxe-Eisenach (Carl August, also Duke of Saxe-Weimar)
- The Duke of Saxe-Coburg (two branches of the Wettin family split this vote:
  - Ernest Frederick of Saxe-Coburg-Saalfeld
  - George I of Saxe-Meiningen)
- The Duke of Saxe-Gotha (Ernest II, also Duke of Saxe-Altenburg)
- The Duke of Saxe-Altenburg (Ernest II, also Duke of Saxe-Gotha)
- The Margrave of Brandenburg-Ansbach (Frederick William II, also King of Prussia)
- The Margrave of Brandenburg-Bayreuth (Frederick William II, also King of Prussia)
- The Duke of Brunswick-Celle (George III, also King of Great Britain and Ireland and Elector of Hanover)
- The Duke of Brunswick-Kalenberg (George III, also King of Great Britain and Ireland and Elector of Hanover)
- The Duke of Brunswick-Grubenhagen (George III, also King of Great Britain and Ireland and Elector of Hanover)
- The Duke of Brunswick-Wolfenbüttel (Charles William Ferdinand)
- The Prince of Halberstadt (Frederick William II, also King of Prussia)
- The Duke of Farther Pomerania (Frederick William II, also King of Prussia)
- The Duke of Upper Pomerania (Gustav III, also King of Sweden)
- The Prince of Verden (George III, also King of Great Britain and Ireland and Elector of Hanover)
- The Duke of Mecklenburg-Schwerin (Frederick Francis I)
- The Duke of Mecklenburg-Güstrow (Frederick Francis I, also Duke of Mecklenburg-Schwerin)
- The Duke of Württemberg (Karl Eugen)
- The Landgrave of Hesse-Kassel (or Hesse-Cassel) (William IX)
- The Landgrave of Hesse-Darmstadt (Louis X)
- The Margrave of Baden-Baden (Charles Frederick, Margrave of Baden)
- The Margrave of Baden-Durlach (Charles Frederick, Margrave of Baden)
- The Margrave of Baden-Hachberg (Charles Frederick, Margrave of Baden)
- The Duke of Holstein (Christian VII, also King of Denmark)
- The Duke of Saxe-Lauenburg (George III, also King of Great Britain and Ireland and Elector of Hanover)
- The Prince of Minden (Frederick William II, also King of Prussia)
- The Duke of Oldenburg (Peter Frederick William)
- The Duke of Savoy (Victor Amadeus III, also King of Sardinia)
- The Landgrave of Leuchtenberg (Charles Theodore, also Elector Palatine)
- The Prince of Anhalt (4 branches split the vote -
  - Frederick Augustus of Anhalt-Zerbst
  - Leopold III of Anhalt-Dessau
  - Fredrick Albert of Anhalt-Bernburg
  - August Christian of Anhalt-Köthen)
- The Princely Count of Henneberg (this vote was divided among the various branches of the House of Wettin—
  - Frederick Augustus III of the Electorate of Saxony
  - Carl August of Saxe-Weimar-Eisenach
  - Ernest II of Saxe-Gotha-Altenburg
  - George I of Saxe-Meiningen
  - Frederick of Saxe-Hildburghausen
  - Ernst Friedrich of Saxe-Coburg-Saalfeld)
- The Prince of Schwerin (Frederick Francis I, also Duke of Mecklenburg-Schwerin)
- The Prince of Kammin (Frederick William II, also King of Prussia)
- The Prince of Ratzeburg (Adolphus Frederick IV, also Duke of Mecklenburg-Strelitz)
- The Prince of Hersfeld (William IX, also Landgrave of Hesse-Kassel)
- The Prince of Nomény (to the House of Lorraine; Emperor Leopold II, also King of Bohemia, etc.)
- The Prince of Mömpelgard (Montbéliard) (Charles Eugene, also Duke of Württemberg)
- The Duke of Arenberg (Louis Engelbert)
- The Prince of Hohenzollern-Hechingen (Josef Friedrich Wilhelm)
- The Prince of Lobkowitz (Joseph Franz Maximilian)
- The Prince of Salm (there were two branches of this family, who split the vote:
  - Constantin Alexander of Salm-Salm (de)
  - Frederick III of Salm-Kyrburg)
- The Prince of Dietrichstein-Tarasp (Karl Johann)
- The Prince of Nassau-Hadamar (William V, also Prince of Orange and Stadtholder of the United Provinces)
- The Prince of Nassau-Dillenburg (William V, also Prince of Orange and Stadtholder of the United Provinces)
- The Prince of Auersperg (Karl Josef Anton)
- The Prince of East Frisia (Frederick William II, also King of Prussia)
- The Prince of Fürstenberg (Joseph Maria Benedict) (de)
- The Prince of Schwarzenberg (Joseph II)
- The Prince of Liechtenstein (Aloys I)
- The Prince of Thurn und Taxis (Karl Anselm)
- The Prince of Schwarzburg (there were two branches of this family, who split the vote -
  - Christian Günther III of Schwarzburg-Sondershausen
  - Frederick Charles of Schwarzburg-Rudolstadt)
- A single vote for the College of the Counts of Swabia; see below
- A single vote for the College of the Counts of the Wetterau; see below
- A single vote for the College of the Counts of Franconia; see below
- A single vote for the College of the Counts of Westphalia; see below

=== The Council of Cities ===
The Council of Imperial Free Cities was theoretically equal to the others, but in actuality it was never allowed to cast a deciding vote and in practice its vote was only advisory. In 1792, there were 51 Free Cities, divided amongst two benches.

==== Rhenish Bench ====
- Cologne
- Aachen
- Lübeck
- Worms
- Speyer
- Frankfurt am Main
- Goslar
- Bremen
- Hamburg
- Mühlhausen
- Nordhausen
- Dortmund
- Friedberg
- Wetzlar

==== Swabian Bench ====
- Regensburg
- Augsburg
- Nuremberg
- Ulm
- Esslingen am Neckar
- Reutlingen
- Nördlingen
- Rothenburg ob der Tauber
- Schwäbisch Hall
- Rottweil
- Überlingen
- Heilbronn
- Schwäbisch Gmünd
- Memmingen
- Lindau
- Dinkelsbühl
- Biberach
- Ravensburg
- Schweinfurt
- Kempten
- Windsheim
- Kaufbeuren
- Weil
- Wangen
- Isny
- Pfullendorf
- Offenburg
- Leutkirch
- Wimpfen
- Weißenburg im Nordgau
- Giengen
- Gengenbach
- Zell am Harmersbach
- Buchhorn
- Aalen
- Buchau
- Bopfingen

=== Membership of single-vote colleges ===
The two benches of the Council of Princes each contained single-vote colleges. The membership of each of these was as follows:

==== The Prelates of Swabia ====
- The Abbess of Baindt
- The Abbot of Elchingen
- The Abbot of Gengenbach
- The Abbess of Gutenzell
- The Abbess of Heggbach
- The Abbot of Irsee
- The Abbot of Kaisheim
- The Abbot of Marchtal
- The Abbot of Neresheim
- The Abbot of Ochsenhausen
- The Abbot of Petershausen
- The Abbot of Roggenburg
- The Abbot of Rot
- The Abbot of Rottenmünster
- The Abbot of Salmannsweiler
- The Abbot of Schussenried
- The Abbess of Söflingen
- The Abbot of Ursperg
- The Abbot of Weingarten
- The Abbot of Weissenau
- The Abbot of Wettenhausen
- The Abbot of Zwiefalten

==== The Prelates of the Rhine ====
- The Abbot of Bruchsal and Odenheim
- The Abbess of Buchau
- The Abbot of Burtscheid
- The Abbot of Ballei of Koblenz (Grand Master of the Teutonic Order)
- The Abbot of St. Cornelismünster
- The Abbot of Ballei of Elsass and Burgundy (Grand Master of the Teutonic Order)
- The Abbess of Essen
- The Abbess of Gandersheim
- The Abbot of St Georg in Isny
- The Abbess of Gernrode
- The Abbess of Herford
- The Abbess of Niedermünster in Regensburg
- The Abbess of Obermünster in Regensburg
- The Abbess of Quedlinburg
- The Abbess of Thorn
- The Abbot of St. Ulrich and St. Afra in Augsburg
- The Abbot of Werden

==== The Counts of the Wetterau ====
- The Princes and Counts of Solms
- The Prince of Nassau-Usingen
- The Prince of Nassau-Weilburg
- The Prince of Nassau-Saarbrücken
- The Princes and Counts of Isenburg
- The Counts of Stolberg
- The Princes and Counts of Sayn-Wittgenstein
- The Counts of Salm
- The Princes and Counts of Leiningen
- The Counts of Westerburg
- The Counts of Wetter-Tegerfelden
- The Counts of Hoyos
- The Counts of Schönburg
- The Count of Wied-Runkel
- The Counts of Ortenburg
- The Counts of Reuss zu Plauen

==== The Counts of Swabia ====
- The Prince of Fürstenberg
- The Abbess of Buchau (in possession of the Lordship of Straßberg)
- The Commander of the Teutonic Knights
- The Prince of Oettingen
- The Count of Montfort (also King of Bohemia)
- The Count of Helfenstein (also Elector of Bavaria)
- The Prince of Schwarzenberg
- The Count of Königsegg
- The Count of Waldburg
- The Count of Eberstein (also Margrave of Baden)
- The Count von der Leyen
- The Counts of Fugger
- The Lord of Hohenems (also King of Bohemia)
- The Prince-Abbot of St. Blase (in possession of the County of Bonndorf)
- The Count of Pappenheim
- The Count of Stadion
- The Count of Traun
- The Prince of Thurn und Taxis
- the Count of Wetter-Tegerfelden in Bonndorf
- The Prince of Khevenhüller
- The Count of Kuefstein
- The Prince of Colloredo
- The Count of Harrach
- The Count of Sternberg
- The Count of Neipperg

==== The Counts of Franconia ====
- The Princes and Counts of Hohenlohe
- The Counts of Castell
- The Counts of Erbach
- The Counts of Rothenberg (later the Counts of Rothberg)
- The Princes and Counts of Löwenstein-Wertheim
- The Heirs to the Counts of Limpurg
- The Counts of Nostitz-Rieneck
- The Prince of Schwarzenberg
- The Heirs to the Counts of Wolfstein
- The Counts of Schönborn
- The Counts of Windisch-Grätz
- The Counts Orsini von Rosenberg
- The Counts of Starhemberg
- The Counts of Wurmbrand
- The Counts of Giech
- The Counts of Gravenitz
- The Counts of Pückler

==== The Counts of Westphalia ====
- The Lord of Sayn-Altenkirchen (also King of Prussia)
- The Count of Hoya (also King of Britain)
- The Count of Spiegelberg (also King of Britain)
- The Count of Diepholz (also King of Britain)
- The Duke of Holstein-Gottorp
- The Count of Tecklenburg (also King of Prussia)
- The Duke of Arenberg
- The Prince of Wied-Runkel
- The Prince of Wied-Neuwied
- The Count of Schaumburg (shared between the Landgrave of Hesse-Kassel and the Count of Lippe-Bückeburg)
- The Counts of Lippe
- The Counts of Bentheim
- The Princes and Counts of Löwenstein-Wertheim
- The Prince of Kaunitz-Rietberg
- The Prince of Waldeck and Pyrmont
- The Count of Toerring
- The Count of Aspremont
- The Prince of Salm-Salm (as Count of Anholt)
- The Count of Metternich-Winnenburg
- The Prince of Anhalt-Bernburg-Schaumburg
- The Counts of Plettenberg
- The Counts of Limburg-Stirum
- The Count of Wallmoden
- The Count of Quadt
- The Counts of Ostein
- The Counts of Nesselrode
- The Counts of Salm-Reifferscheidt
- The Counts of Platen
- The Counts of Sinzendorf
- The Prince of Ligne

== See also ==
- List of states in the Holy Roman Empire

== Sources ==
- Val Rozn, "The Secular Voices in the Council of Princes (Fürstenrat) of the Imperial Assembly (Reichstag) in 1582" (1999–2009)
- G. Oestreich und E. Holzer, 'Übersicht über die Reichsstände'. in Bruno Gebhardt: Handbuch der Deutschen Geschichte. 9. Auflage, Bd. 2. Ernst Ketler Verlag, Stuttgart. 1973. pp. 769–784.
