= Count of Champlitte =

The title Count of Champlitte was created by letters patent on 5 September 1574 by Philip II, King of Spain, for Francois de Vergy, son of Guillaume de Vergy the Seigneur de Champlitte.

== Counts of Champlitte ==

The Counts of Champlitte were:

1. Francois de Vergy (1530-1591)
2. Cleriadus de Vergy (d. 1630)
3. Claude-Francois de Cusance (1590 – 1629)
4. Cleriadus de Cusance (1619 – 1635)
5. Marie Henriette de Cusance (1624 – 1701)
- Madeleine de Cusance, comtesse de Bergh, baronne de Boxmer (1616-1689)
1. Francois de Clermont d’Amboise (1632 – 1684)
2. Jean Baptiste de Toulongeon (1677 – 1703)
3. Jean Francois de Toulongeon (1702 – 1784)
4. Jean René de Toulongeon (1739 – 1794)

== Vergy ==
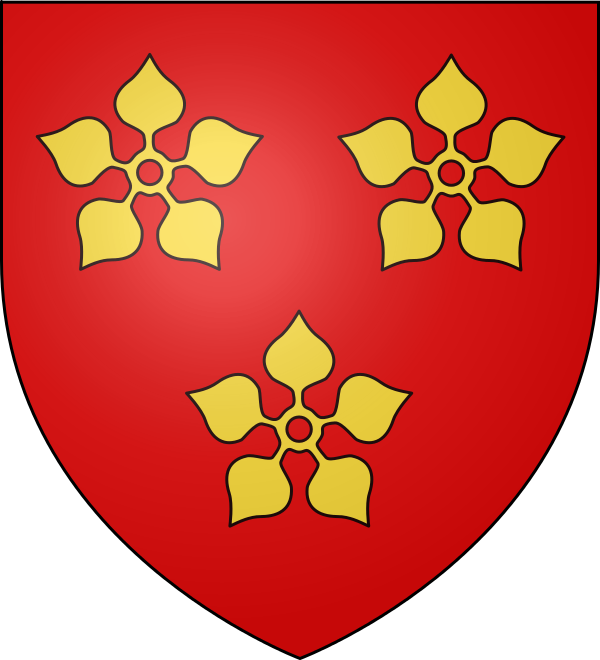
Vergy

The Vergy family were a distinguished and ancient noble house in Franche-Comté and Burgundy who numbered among their ancestors both Robert 1, King of France, and Rudolph 1, King of Germany. They were the first historically attested owners of the Turin Shroud (1353). Francois de Vergy had been a page of honour to the Emperor, Charles V, and was Lt General and Governor of the County of Burgundy. In 1584 he was made a Knight of the Order of the Golden Fleece.

Francois de Vergy had two sons, the elder of whom, Claude, died in 1588. His second son, Cleriadus, succeeded his father to the title. He was also Lt General and Governor of the County of Burgundy and in 1615 was made a knight of the Order of the Golden Fleece. He had no children and the title and estate was inherited by his nephew Claude-Francois de Cusance, son of Beatrice de Vergy and Vaudelin-Simon de Cusance, the Baron of Belvoir and a Knight of the Golden Spur, later known as the Count of Champlitte.

== Cusance ==
Cusance

Claude-Francois de Cusance was a distinguished soldier and, as a colonel of the Empire he commanded 3,000 Burgundians in the service of the king of Spain. He had two sons and four daughters. The eldest daughter, Beatrice, married Charles IV, Duke of Lorraine and their descendants include the princely Dukes of Rohan and of Montbazon as well as the mignon Dukes of Joyeuse. The second daughter, Madeleine, married the Count Albert III van den Berg (1607-1656), whose descendants through the Hohenzollern dynasty include the emperor of Austria and kings of Bavaria, Belgium, Italy, Portugal, Romania and Spain. The third daughter was a nun who founded the convent at Gray, and the last daughter married the Duke of Arenburg and Aarschot, governor of Hainaut.

The eldest son died in 1619, and so the title of Count of Champlitte passed in 1633 to the second son, Cleriadus de Cusance. Cleriadus died aged 16 in 1635 in what has been described as ‘mysterious circumstances’. The estate of Champlitte was briefly held by his sister, Marie Henriette, Duchess of Arenberg, but with no male heirs in this line of the de Cusance family the title went to Francois de Clermont d’Amboise. He was the grandson of Anne de Vergy, younger daughter of Francois de Vergy. His daughter Marie Francoise de Clermont d’Amboise married Jean Baptiste de Toulongeon, who became the seventh Count of Champlitte, followed by his son, Jean Francois and his son after him, Jean René de Toulongeon who died in 1794 with no male heirs.

The title Count of Champlitte fell into abeyance in 1790, when titles were first abolished by Napoleon, and has not been used since.

== Toulongeon ==
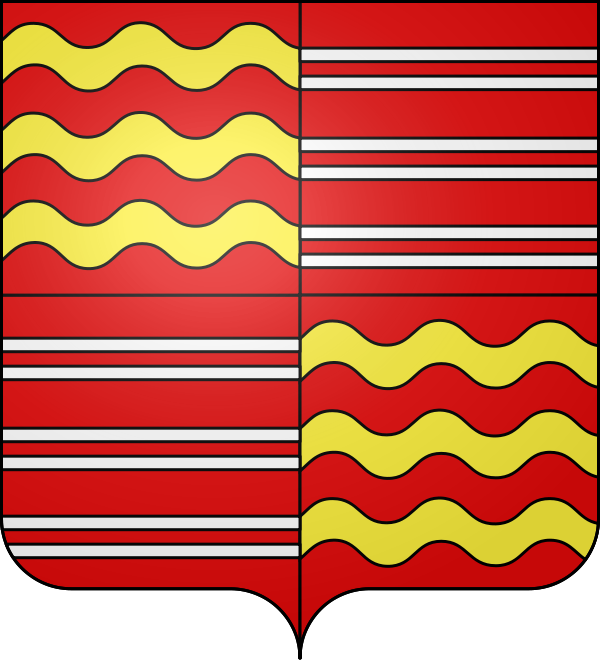
Toulongeon

The Counts of Toulongeon were a distinguished noble house in Burgundy, with a long military tradition that continued with the revolutionary army, with three of them serving as Generals. A cousin, the Marquis de Toulongeon, was one of Napoleon's key aide de camps. The Chateau de Champlitte, which had burnt down in 1751, was rebuilt by the family in the renaissance / neoclassical style. It passed to Count Anne-Alexander de Toulongeon upon the death of his brother Jean René, and upon his death in 1823 was sold to the town and used as the city hall. In 1907 it was classified as a historic monument and is in use today as a museum.

== Cussans ==
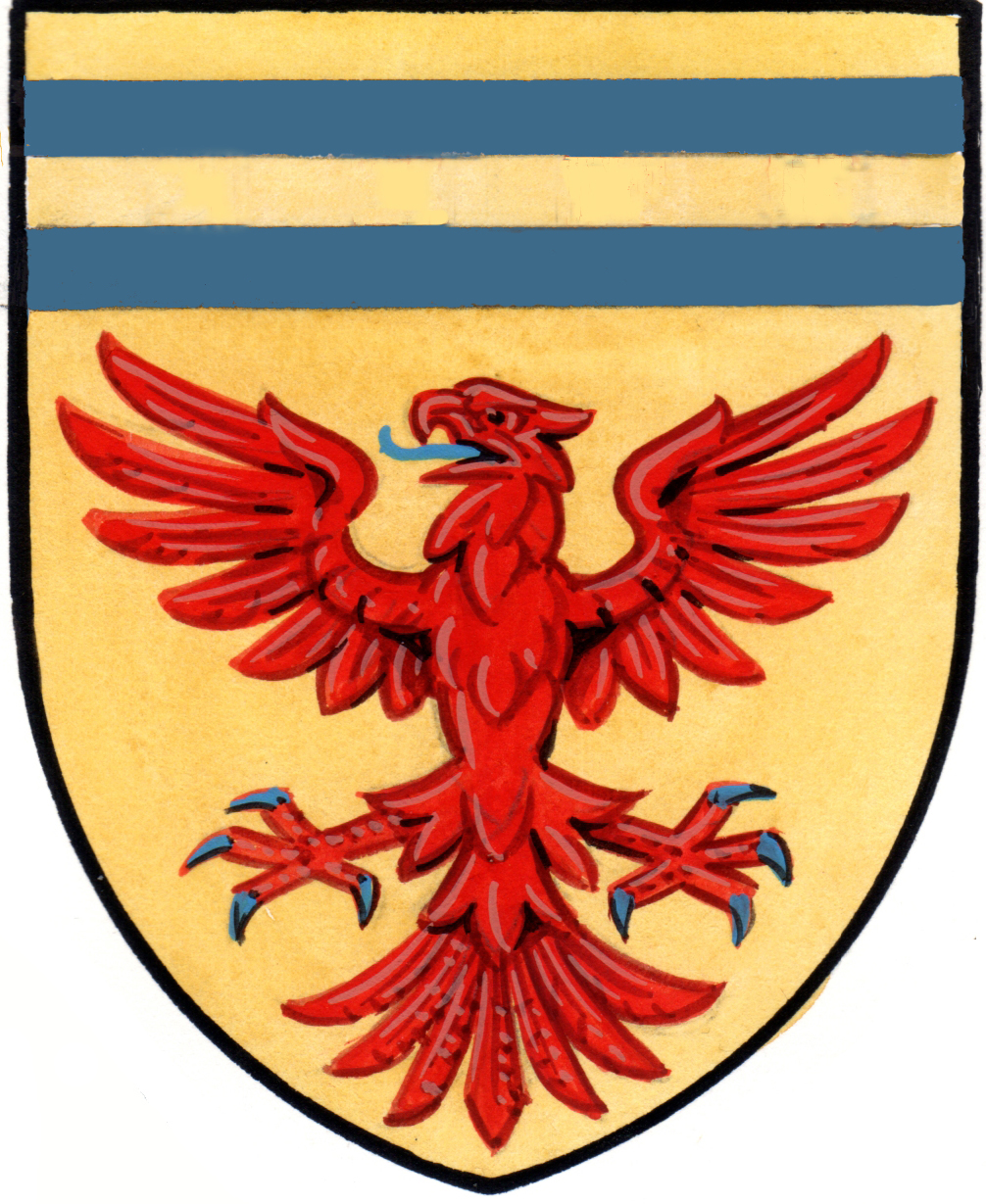
Cussans

The only remaining male line of descent is through Ermenfroy de Cusance (1591-1623), younger son of Vaudelin-Simon de Cusance and Beatrice de Vergy. Some local histories report that Ermenfroy, the Baron of St-Julien and Seigneur of Cusance, had no children, but this is not correct. He had a son who was baptised at the church in Gonsan, Doubs, where the register records: ‘Pedrus, filius Rosae de Fullez donatus qui de St Julien et de Cusance etc, baptizatus 19th May 1619.’ Ermenfroy de Cusance was a Captain of Horse in the service of Spain in the Savoy and Flanders. He died in 1623, aged 32. The descendants of Ermenfroy, through Pierre de Cusance, left France for the New World and settled in Jamaica, originally a Spanish colony, subsequently taken by the British in 1655. They were successful planters who over five generations built up substantial sugar works in St Thomas in the East. Their descendants left Jamaica for England. Thomas Cussans of Amity Hall, Jamaica, was granted arms by the College of Arms in 1767. In the letters patent it states: " .. That He and his Family have used a Coat of Arms and Crest as from their Ancestors but not finding the same duly registered in the Heralds office .. did therefore humbly request the Favour of His Lordship's Warrant for our granting .. Arms and Crest as He and They may lawfully bear and use .."

The Arms granted are "Or (gold background), an Eagle, displayed Gules (red), armed and langued Azure (blue claws and tongue)". Thus the Cussans family carry forward the Arms of de Cusance, in the same colours.
