= Jean de Ligne =

Military commander in the Habsburg Netherlands

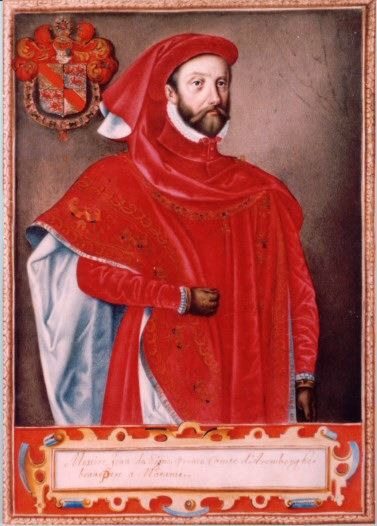
Portrait of Jean de Ligne

Jean de Ligne (c. 1525 – 23 May 1568), Baron of Barbançon and later Count of Arenberg, was a military commander in the Habsburg Netherlands and a member of the House of Ligne. He was the stadtholder of the Dutch provinces of Friesland, Groningen, Drenthe and Overijssel until his death at the Battle of Heiligerlee. In 1547, he married Margaret de La Marck-Arenberg, who had become the ruling Countess of Arenberg after her brother died without children.

== Life and career ==
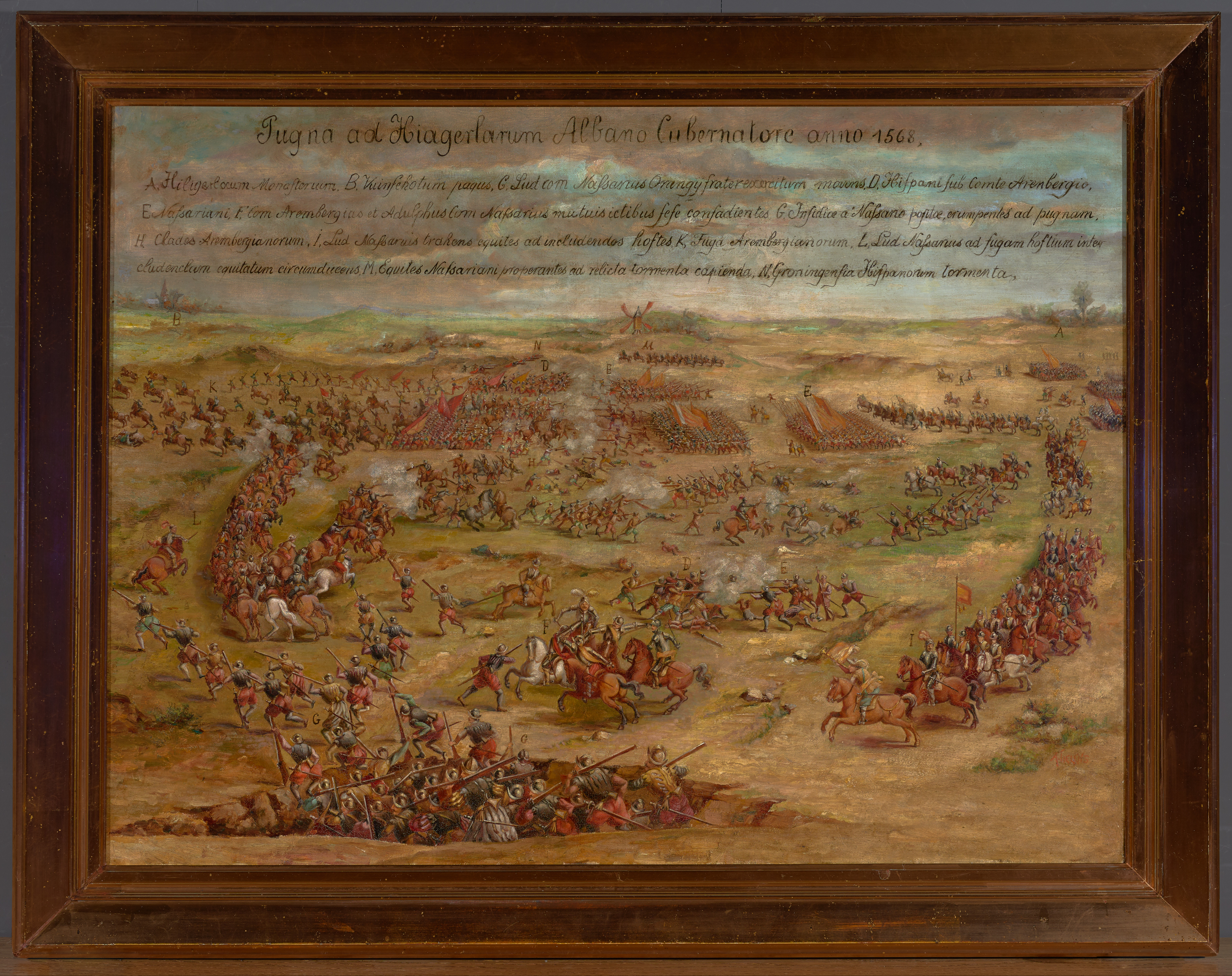
The Battle of Heiligerlee, 1568, by Alexandre Tielens after a print by Frans Hogenberg

Jean was the son of Louis de Ligne, Baron of Barbançon, and his wife Marie of Glymes, Lady of Zevenbergen (1503–1566), daughter of Cornelis of Glymes.

Jean belonged to a close circle around Charles V. In 1546, he was made a knight of the Order of the Golden Fleece. He subsequently became the stadtholder of the northern provinces of Friesland, Groningen, Drenthe and Overijssel. By his marriage to Margaret de La Marck-Arenberg, sister of Robert III de La Marck-Arenberg, who died without children, Jean became the founder of the third House of Arenberg.

Jean participated in the campaign in France and distinguished himself in the Battle of St. Quentin (1557), where he – together with Henry V, Duke of Brunswick-Lüneburg – led the left wing of the infantry in the final attack against the French.

At the start of the rebellion, he distanced himself from his good friend William the Silent, Lamoral, Count of Egmont, and Philip de Montmorency, Count of Hoorn, and he remained loyal to King Philip II of Spain.

He was unable to stop the spread of Protestantism in his northern provinces, but he succeeded in 1567 to keep them loyal to the Crown without bloodshed. Back south, he joined the army under the Duke of Alva, but he objected to the arrests of Egmont and Hoorn. When Louis and Adolf of Nassau (brothers of William I of Orange) invaded Groningen, he was sent back by Alva to repulse this army.

Jean was killed in the Battle of Heiligerlee on 23 May 1568. Cardinal Granvelle described his death as a great loss for the Catholic faith and the king. Jean was buried in Saint Catherine Church in Zevenbergen, but his remains were moved in 1614 to the family vault in Enghien.

== Marriage and issue ==
In 1547, Jean married Margaret de La Marck-Arenberg, and their children included the following:

- Charles (1550–1616), who became Princely Count of Arenberg
- Margaret (1552–1611), married in 1569 with Philip de Lalaing, Count of Lalaing
- Antonia Wilhelmina (1557–1626), married in 1577 with Salentin IX of Isenburg-Grenzau, Archbishop of Cologne (who left the clergy to marry her)
- Robert (1564–1614), who became Prince of Barbançon and was the father of Albert de Ligne, Prince of Barbançon

== Sources ==
- de Jonge, Krista (2000). "Le palais Granvelle a Bruxelles: premier exemple de la Renaissance romaine dans les anciens Pays-Bas?". In de Jonge, Krista; Janssens, Gustaaf (eds.). Les Granvelle et les anciens Pays-Bas (in French). Leuven University Press. pp. 341–388.
- Marini, Mirella (2015). "From Arenburg to Aarschot and Back Again: Female Inheritance and the Disputed 'Merger' of Two Aristocratic Identities". In Geevers, Liesbeth; Marini, Mirella (eds.). Dynastic Identity in Early Modern Europe: Rulers, Aristocrats and the Formation of Identities. Ashgate. pp. 103–130.113-115
- van der Lem, Anton (2018). Revolt in the Netherlands: The Eighty Years War, 1568-1648. Translated by Brown, Andy. Reaktion books.

Regnal titles
Preceded by Maximilian of Egmond, Count of Buren	Stadtholder of Friesland, Groningen, Drenthe and Overijssel; 1559–1568	Succeeded by Charles de Brimeu, Count of Megen
Preceded by Louis de Ligne	Free Lord of Zuid-Polsbroek; 1568	Succeeded by Charles de Ligne, 2nd Prince of Arenberg
