= House of Arenberg =

German noble family

Coordinates: 50°52′45″N 4°42′07″E

- Arms of the Dukes of Arenberg
- Founded: Middle Ages
- Current head: Léopold, 13th Duke of Arenberg
- Titles: Duke of Arenberg; Duke of Aarschot; Prince of the Holy Roman Empire
- Style: Serene Highness
- Cadet branches: French ducal branch
- Website: arenbergfoundation.eu

The House of Arenberg is an aristocratic lineage that is constituted by three successive families that took their name from Arenberg, a small territory of the Holy Roman Empire in the Eifel region that included the present-day village of Aremberg. (Note: In French and the official English translation of the Final Act of the Congress of Vienna (1815), the spelling used is Duc d'Aremberg and Duke of Aremberg (see Article X of the VI Act of the Final Act of the Congress of Vienna)) The inheritance of the House of Croÿ-Aarschot made the Arenbergs the wealthiest and most influential noble family of the Habsburg Netherlands. The family's Duchy of Arenberg was a sovereign state until it was mediatized in 1810. As such, the Arenbergs belong to the small group of families that constitute the Hochadel (German for 'high nobility').

The current head of the house bears the title of Duke of Arenberg, while all other members are princes or princesses. They all enjoy the style of Serene Highness.

In 1827, Prince Pierre d'Arenberg, third son of the 6th Duke of Arenberg, was granted the French noble title of duke by King Charles X and was made a hereditary peer of France. His descendants form a French cadet branch of the family, the head of which holds the French ducal title (duc d'Arenberg).

== Lords of Arenberg ==
Date	Name (birth–death)	Notes
1032	Ulrich, Viscount of Cologne	
1061–1074	Franco I.	
1082–1135	Arnold	
1106–1135	Franco II.	
1136–1159	Heinrich I.	
	Gerhard	
1166/67–1197	Heinrich II. de Arberg	
	Eberhard (1200–1218) ∞ Aleidis of Molsberg	also Countess of Freusburg
	Heinrich III. (1220–1252)	
	Gerhard ∞ Mechthild von Holte	
	Johann (1267–1280)	married Johanna von Jülich, sold Viscounty of Cologne
	Mechthild	In 1299, married Count Engelbert II. von der Mark

== Counts of Arenberg ==
Date (reign)	Name	Notes
1299–1328	Count Engelbert II von der Mark	Count of La Marck and, by marriage, Lord of Arenberg
1328–1387	Count Eberhard I von der Marck-Arenberg	Lord of Arenberg
1387–1454	Count Eberhard II von der Marck-Arenberg	Lord of Sedan, and Arenberg
1454–1480	Count Johann von der Marck-Arenberg	Lord of Sedan, and Arenberg
1480–1496	Count Eberhard III von der Marck-Arenberg	Lord of Arenberg; brother of Robert I, Lord of Sedan and chatelain of Bouillon
1496–????	Count Robert I von der Marck-Arenberg	
????–1536	Count Robert II von der Marck-Arenberg	
1536–1541	Count Robert III von der Marck-Arenberg	Upon his death in 1541, the male line ended and his sister Margaret ruled the territory
1541–1568	Countess Margaret von der Marck-Arenberg	Married Jean de Ligne in 1547, who became her co-ruler until his death in 1568
1568–1616	Charles, Count of Arenberg	Elevated to Princely Count in 1576, along with his mother Margaret

== Princely Counts and later Dukes of Arenberg ==
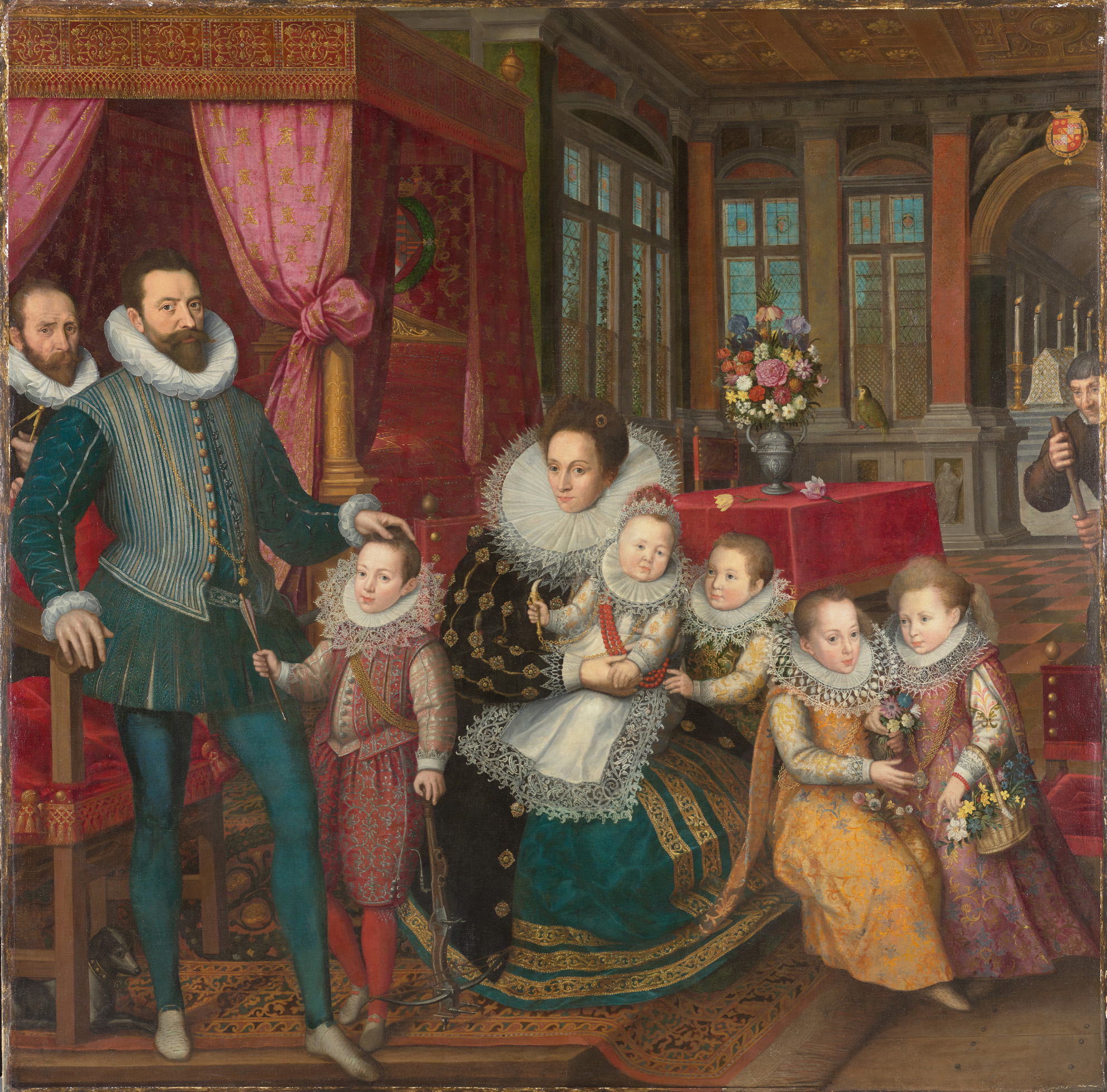
Count Charles of Arenberg and Anne de Croÿ, with their children

The marriage contract in 1547 between Margaret von der Marck, Countess of Arenberg, and Jean de Ligne stipulated that their offspring would abandon the name of Ligne (to which house they belonged) and adopt the name and arms of Arenberg. On 5 March 1576, Emperor Maximilian II raised Margaret and her son Charles to the rank of Princely Count (German: Gefürsteter Graf). As such, the Arenbergs sat and voted on the bench of secular princes in the Imperial Diet. On 9 June 1644, Emperor Ferdinand III bestowed the title of Duke of Arenberg (German: Herzog von Arenberg) on Charles' grandsons, Philip-Francis and Charles-Eugene, as well as on all legitimate descendants of Charles and his brother Robert, Prince of Barbançon (father of Albert, Prince of Barbançon).

Meanwhile, the marriage in 1587 of Princely Count Charles to Anne de Croÿ, the sister and heiress of Charles III de Croÿ (the last Duke of Aarschot of the House of Croÿ), subsequently brought the Arenbergs a series of titles in 1612, as well as vast estates in the Habsburg Netherlands. The senior title was that of Duke of Aarschot. It had been created in 1534, it was the first (and until 1627 the only) ducal title in the Netherlands, and it carried the dignity of a Spanish Grandee. The lands of the Arenbergs gave them a seat in the second estate of the Provincial States of Brabant and of Hainaut.

Since the Arenbergs were now indisputably first among the nobility of the Habsburg Netherlands, it became customary for successive Dukes of Aarschot to receive the Order of the Golden Fleece shortly after their succession to the title. Staunch supporters of the Habsburgs, they held high offices at the Court of Brussels, sat on the Counsel of State, were employed on embassies (notably the embassy to King James I of England that negotiated the Treaty of London of 1604) and acted as provincial governors in Hainaut and the Franche-Comté. Occupying high military commands could likewise be called something like their birthright.

In 1605, Charles d'Arenberg and Anne de Croÿ bought the Land of Enghien of King Henry IV of France, and they made it their principal seat in the Netherlands. Initially inspired by the example set by Robert Cecil at Theobalds House, the Arenbergs created gardens at Enghien that came to enjoy an international reputation. In testimony of the patronage given to the Capuchins, the order's convent at Enghien became the necropolis of the Arenbergs.

With the Duchy of Aarschot came the secondary country seat of Heverlee and the vast forest of Meerdaal. In keeping with their high status, the Arenbergs also owned a residence in Brussels. After its destruction in the bombardment of 1695, the Arenbergs had to settle for rented accommodation until acquiring the stately Egmont Palace in 1754. It was to remain in the family's possession until 1918.

During the War of the First Coalition, the Arenbergs lost their territories on the Left Bank of the Rhine. In 1803, Louis Engelbert, 6th Duke of Arenberg, was compensated with Recklinghausen and Meppen in Germany, and in 1806 also with the county of Dülmen, together named the Duchy of Arenberg. In 1810, Napoleon occupied it; in 1815, the Congress of Vienna returned it at first but then mediatized Meppen in favor of the Kingdom of Hanover and Recklinghausen in favor of the Kingdom of Prussia. The House of Arenberg received the rights and rank of a mediatized house.

Duke Engelbert-Marie (1872-1949) acquired Schloss Nordkirchen in 1903, but he was expropriated of (or forced to sell) his vast property in Belgium after World War I, due to his service as an officer in the Imperial German Army. His German property was inherited by his three children, and major parts of it were granted to a charitable trust in 1989 by his daughter-in-law, Duchess Mathildis (née Calley).

== Gallery ==
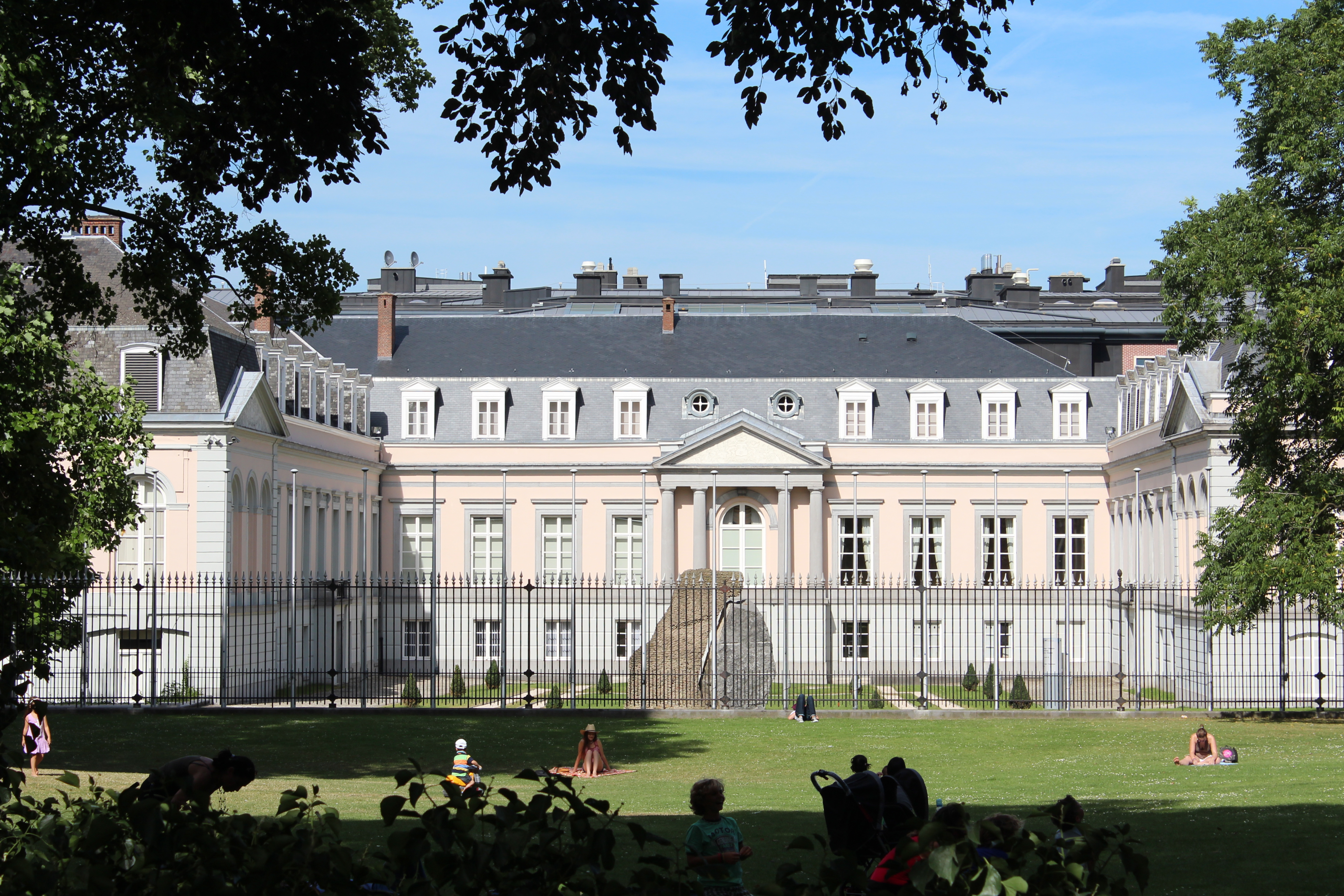
Egmont Palace, Brussels

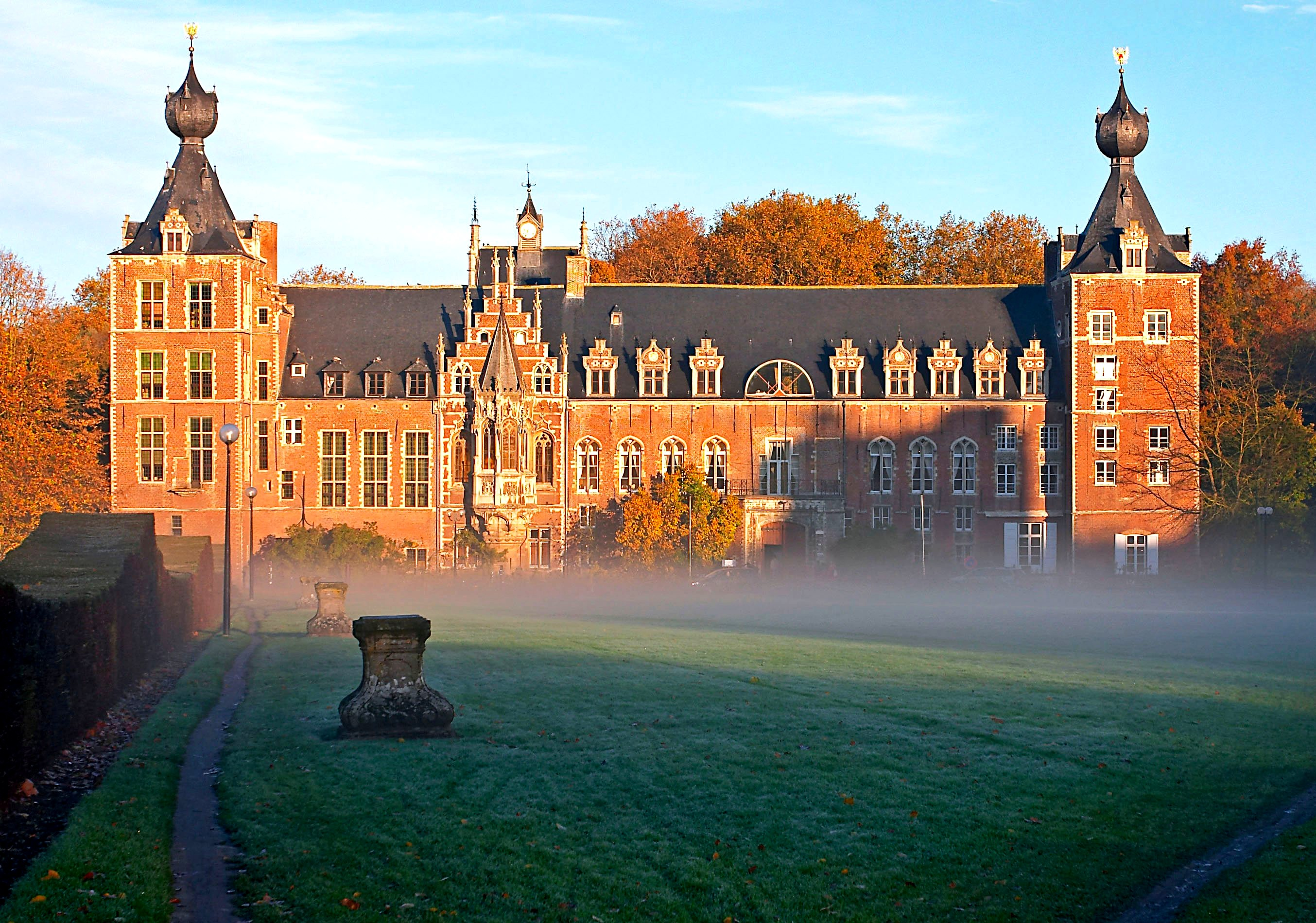
Arenberg Castle, Belgium

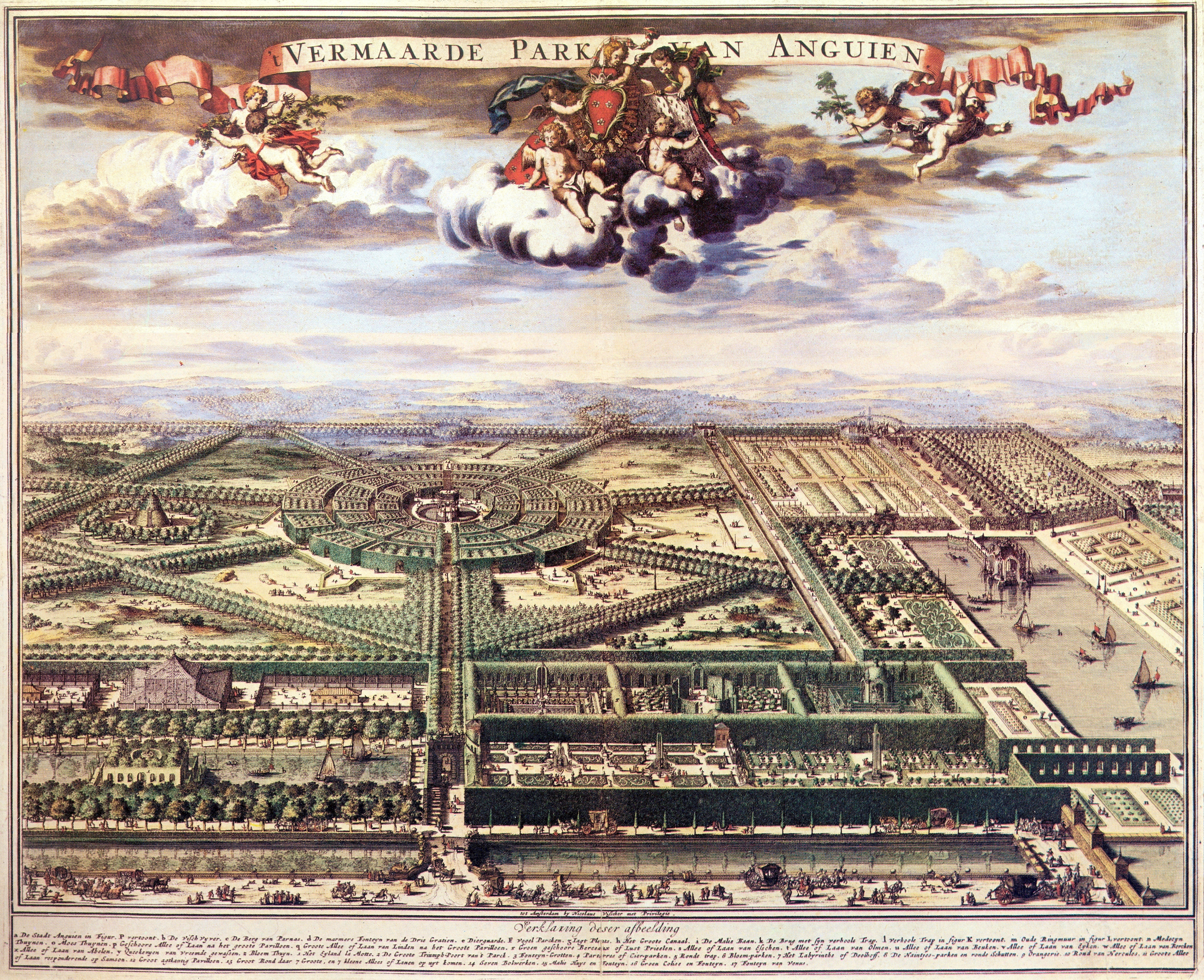
Enghien Gardens, Belgium

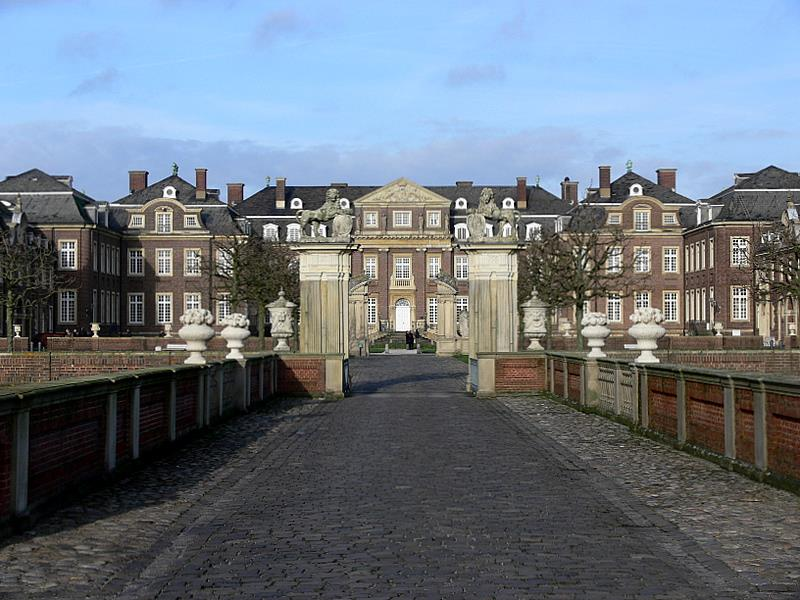
Schloss Nordkirchen, Westphalia

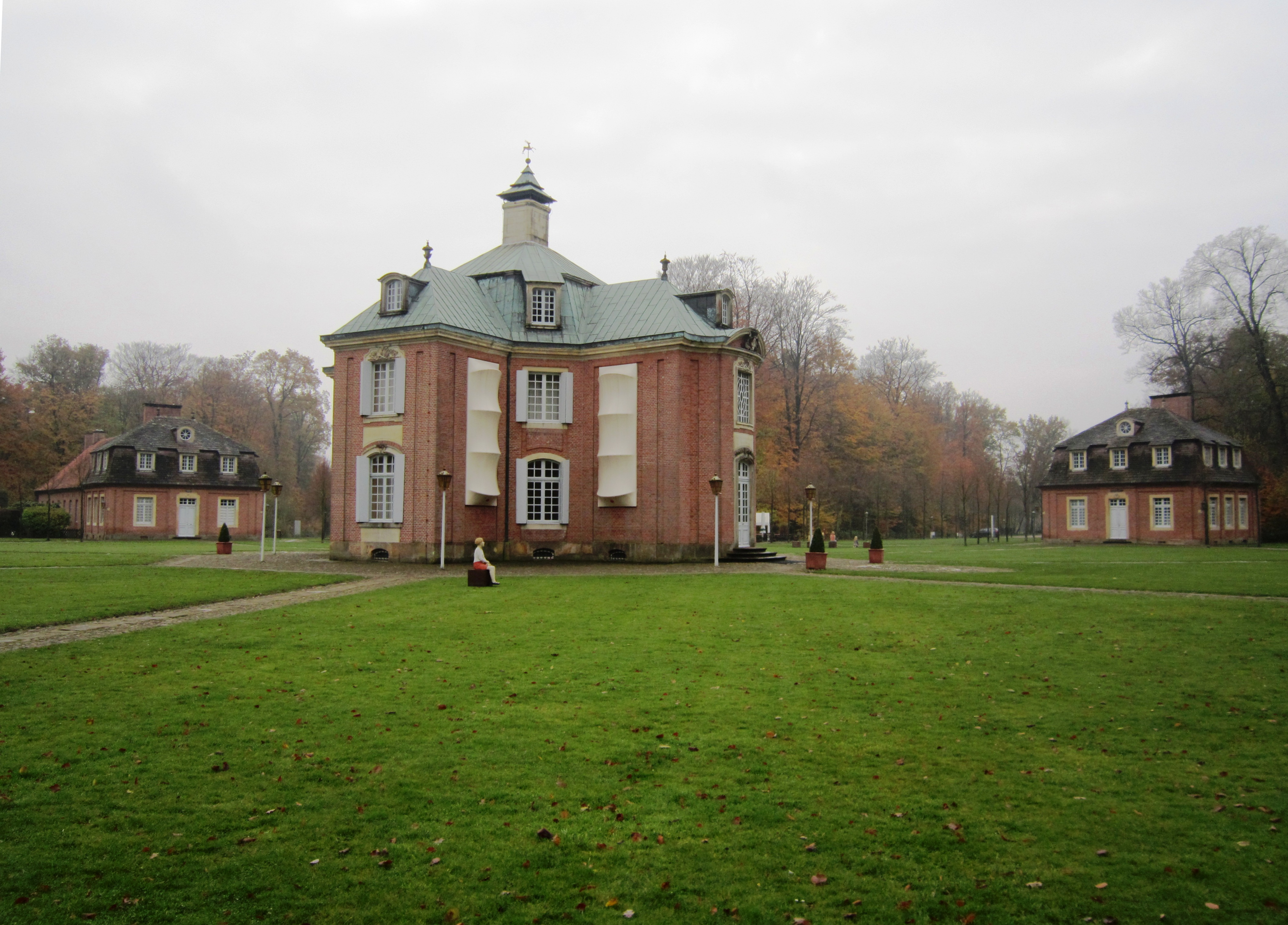
Clemenswerth Hunting Lodge, Westphalia

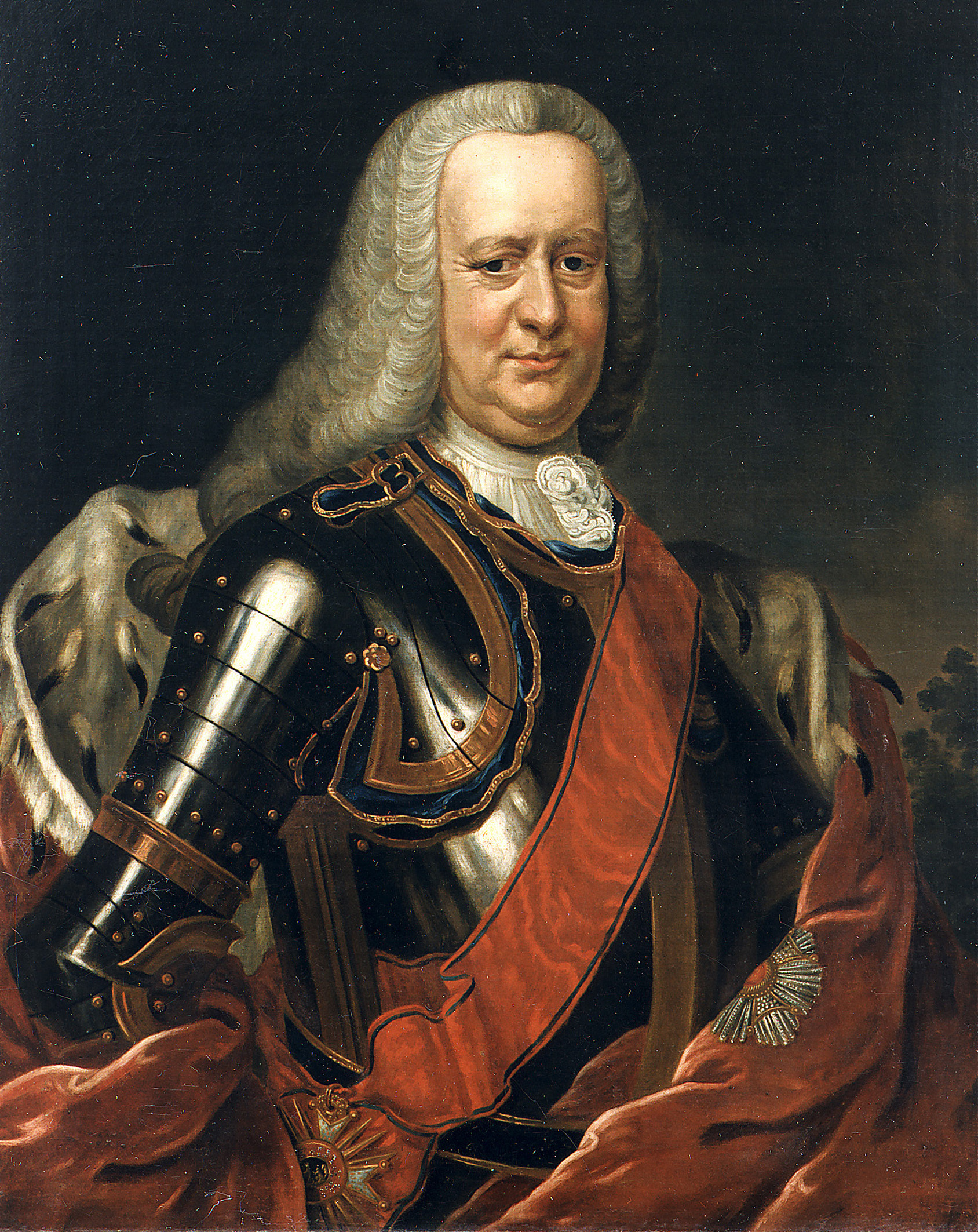
Portrait of the 5th Duke of Arenberg

== List of heads of the House of Arenberg ==
Period	Name and main titles (birth–death)	Notes
1576–1599	Margaret, 1st Princely Countess of Arenberg (1527–1599)	married Jean de Ligne (1528–1568)
1599–1616	Charles, 2nd Princely Count of Arenberg (1550–1616)	son of Jean and Margaret
1616–1640	Philippe-Charles, 3rd Princely Count of Arenberg and 6th Duke of Aarschot (1587–1640)	son of Charles and Anne de Croÿ, Duchess of Aarschot
1640–1674	Philippe François, 1st Duke of Arenberg and 7th Duke of Aarschot (1625–1674)	son of Philippe-Charles
1674–1681	Charles Eugene, 2nd Duke of Arenberg and 8th Duke of Aarschot (1633–1681)	half-brother of Philippe François
1681–1691	Philippe-François-Charles, 3rd Duke of Arenberg and 9th Duke of Aarschot (1663–1691)	son of Charles Eugene
1691–1754	Léopold-Philippe, 4th Duke of Arenberg and 10th Duke of Aarschot (1690–1754)	son of Philippe-François-Charles
1754–1778	Charles-Marie-Raymond, 5th Duke of Arenberg and 11th Duke of Aarschot (1721–1778)	son of Léopold-Philippe
1778–1820	Louis Engelbert, 6th Duke of Arenberg, 12th Duke of Aarschot, 1st Duke of Meppen and 1st Prince of Recklinghausen (1750–1820)	son of Charles-Marie-Raymond
1820–1861	Prosper Louis, 7th Duke of Arenberg, 13th Duke of Aarschot, 2nd Duke of Meppen and 2nd Prince of Recklinghausen (1785–1861)	son of Louis Engelbert
1861–1875	Engelbert-Auguste, 8th Duke of Arenberg, 14th Duke of Aarschot, 3rd Duke of Meppen and 3rd Prince of Recklinghausen (1824–1875)	son of Prosper Louis
1875–1949	Engelbert-Marie, 9th Duke of Arenberg, 15th Duke of Aarschot, 4th Duke of Meppen and 4th Prince of Recklinghausen (1872–1949)	son of Engelbert-Auguste. He was father-in-law of Italian Royal Prince Filiberto, Duke of Genoa
1949–1974	Engelbert-Charles, 10th Duke of Arenberg, 16th Duke of Aarschot, 5th Duke of Meppen and 5th Prince of Recklinghausen	son of Engelbert-Marie, married Valeria zu Schleswig-Holstein, a great-granddaughter of Queen Victoria as only child of Albert, Duke of Schleswig-Holstein
1974–1992	Erik Engelbert, 11th Duke of Arenberg, 17th Duke of Aarschot, 6th Duke of Meppen and 6th Prince of Recklinghausen	brother of Engelbert-Charles He adopted two stepchildren (including Laetitia d'Arenberg), father-in-law of the Grand Duke of Tuscany
1992–2011	Jean, 12th Duke of Arenberg, 18th Duke of Aarschot, 7th Duke of Meppen and 7th Prince of Recklinghausen	second cousin once removed of Erik -- married Princess Sophie of Bavaria, youngest daughter of Rupprecht, Crown Prince of Bavaria
2011–present	Léopold, 13th Duke of Arenberg, 19th Duke of Aarschot, 8th Duke of Meppen and 8th Prince of Recklinghausen	son of Jean

== See also ==
- List of noble families in Belgium
- Mediatised houses
