= Margaret de La Marck-Arenberg =

Ruling countess of Arenberg (1527–1599)

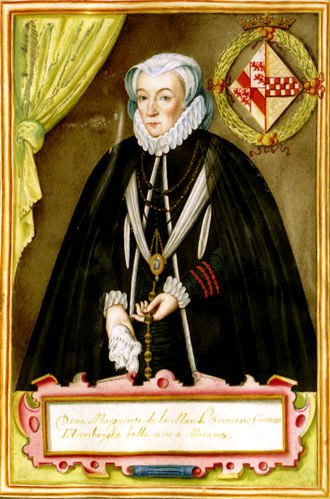
Margarethe von Arenberg

Margaret de La Marck-Arenberg (15 February 1527 – 18 February 1599) was a ruling countess of Arenberg from 1544 to 1599.

== Life ==
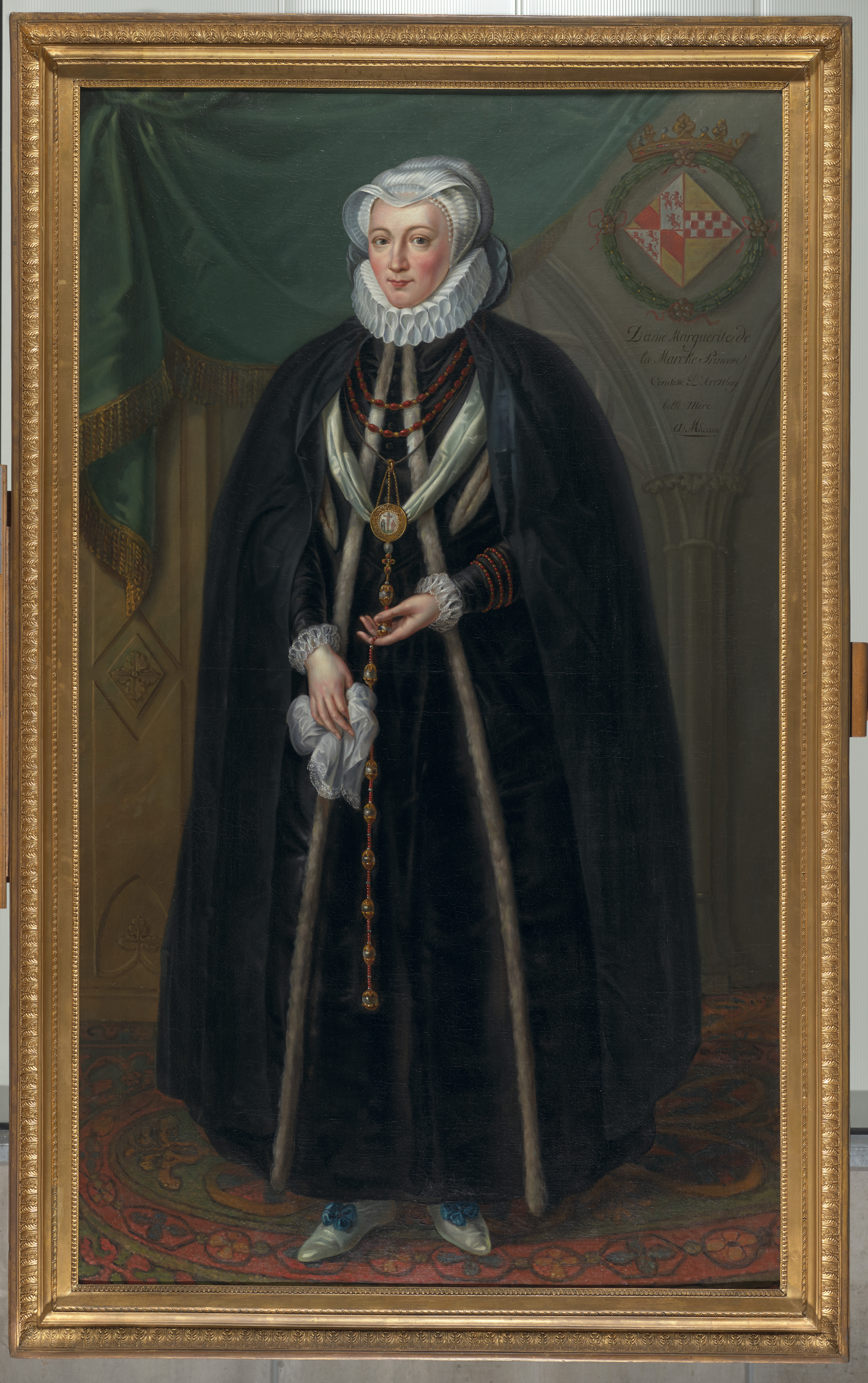
Portrait (1818) by the Leuven painter Josse Pieter Geedts, painted after a portrait miniature (around 1600). Collection Arenberg, KU Leuven

She was the daughter of Robert II van der Marck van Arenberg (1506–1536) and Walburga van Egmond (1500–1547) and the sister of Robert III von der Marck-Arenberg. Her father died in 1541, and was succeeded by her brother. Because her brother was childless, she was his heir. In 1544, her brother died and she succeeded him. In 1547, she married Jean de Ligne (1520–1568).

To prevent her dynasty to die with her because of her gender, the emperor permitted for her spouse and children to bear her name, which was normally not permitted. Her husband became her co-ruler, and she appears not to have been very active in the government while he was alive.

Margaret took control over the state affairs and ruled the County of Arenberg after the death of her spouse in 1576. Her rule is described as efficient and successful. She managed the affairs of the County via correspondence with her officials in Arenberg, as she mainly lived in Brussels. Between 1570 and 1574, she was at the French royal court, serving as dame d'atour to Elisabeth of Austria, Queen of France.

While she herself was Catholic, the majority of the population of Arenberg was Protestant, but she avoided religious tension and largely managed to keep the County out of the religious wars raging in the region during the Dutch rebellion against Spain. She was succeeded by her son.

== Issue ==
- Charles de Ligne, 2nd Prince of Arenberg (1550–1616), her successor
- Margareth (1552–1611), married in 1569 with Philip of Lalaing
- Robert (1564–1614), first Prince of Barbançon
- Antonia Wilhelmina (1557–1626), married in 1577 with Salentin IX of Isenburg-Grenzau, Archbishop of Cologne, who left the clergy to marry her.

Court offices
Preceded by Guyonne de Breüil	Dame d'atour to the Queen of France; 1570–1575	Succeeded by Louise de la Béraudière
