= Philippe-Charles, 3rd Count of Arenberg =

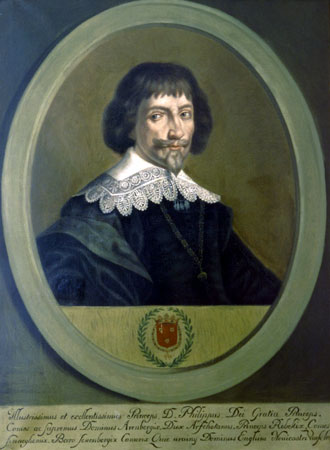
Philippe-Charles, 3rd Count of Arenberg

Philippe-Charles d'Arenberg (18 October 1587 in Barbancon – 25 September 1640 in Madrid) was the third sovereign prince of Arenberg and 6th Duke of Aarschot. He was a leading figure in the political life of the Spanish Netherlands.

== Life ==
Arenberg was the son of Charles de Ligne, 2nd Prince of Arenberg and Anne de Croy, daughter of Philipe de Croÿ, Duke of Aerschot. He was named Duke of Aarschot in 1616, and attained the highest honors in the Habsburg Netherlands, including the Order of the Golden Fleece. As duke he was the first lord temporal in the States of Brabant, and in the Estates General of 1632.

=== Marriage and children ===
He married three times:

- on 21 September 1610 with Pierre Hippolyte Anne de Melun, Baronesse de Caumont, died 1615
- on 28 June 1620 with Isabelle Claire de Berlaymont, Comtesse de Lalaing, died 1630
- on 29 March 1632 with Countess Maria Cleopha von Hohenzollern-Sigmaringen (1599–1685)

and had nine children, two sons and seven daughters.

The sons were :

- Philippe François, 1st Duke of Arenberg (1625–1674)
- Charles Eugene, 2nd Duke of Arenberg (1633–1681)

=== Arrest and death ===
He fell from grace in 1634, and spent the last six years of his life under house arrest in Madrid. The arrest occurred while he was on a diplomatic mission in Spain. Charged with requesting Philip IV to grant the States General of the southern Netherlands the power to negotiate a truce or peace with the United Provinces, Aarschot was sent to Spain in December 1633 as the highest-ranking member of the nobility of the Duchy of Brabant. Although initially received with great consideration by Philip IV, he was denounced four months after his arrival, accused of participating in the 1632 conspiracy to overthrow Spanish rule in the Netherlands. While admitting knowledge of the plot, he denied involvement in it and maintained his innocence. Despite letters from the Archduchess Isabella written on his behalf, Aarschot was imprisoned for some months before being placed under house arrest, in December 1634. Three years later his wife and eldest son joined him, but they were not allowed to reside in his quarters. Aarschot's depressing and restrictive circumstances brought on a debilitating disease, to which he succumbed in 1640. Shortly before his death, Philip IV sent word that his case was under review and a favorable outcome was expected; the duke was too ill to rally, however, and he died the day after receiving the king's message.

== Art collector ==
Philippe-Charles d'Arenberg was a great art-collector and purchased paintings from artists like Paul de Vos, Frans Snyders, Gaspar de Crayer, and Salomon Noveliers, court painter to the archdukes in Brussels. The best known of several Rubens paintings that Arenberg owned was the Wolf and Fox Hunt, believed to be the work today in the New York Metropolitan Museum of Art. The duke of Aarschot was also responsible for the acquisition of Rubens's late Martyrdom of St. Andrew for the Flemish Hospital in Madrid, where it still remains today.
