= Philippe François, 1st Duke of Arenberg =

Duke of Aarschot and Arenberg

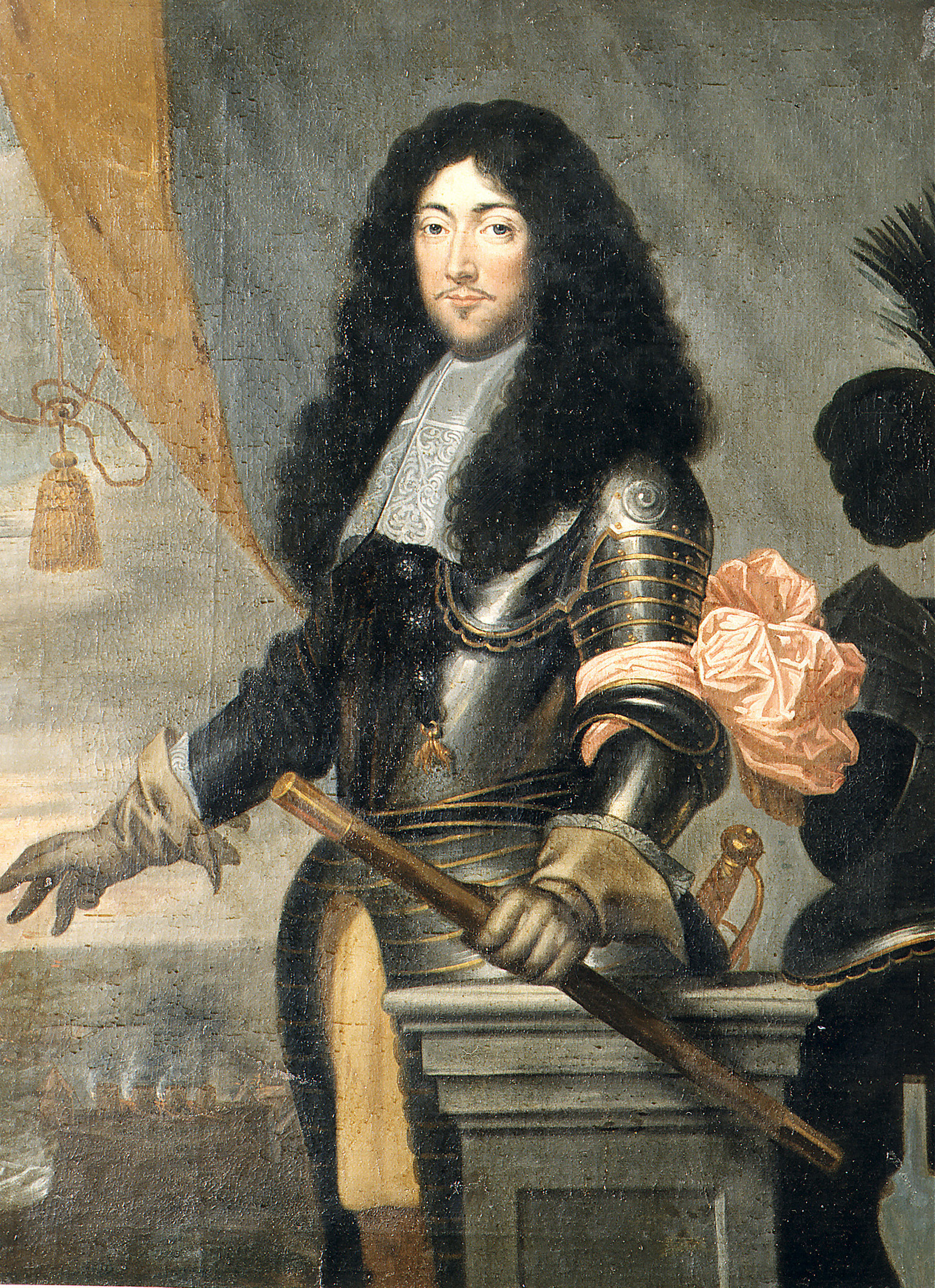
Philippe François, 1st Duke of Arenberg

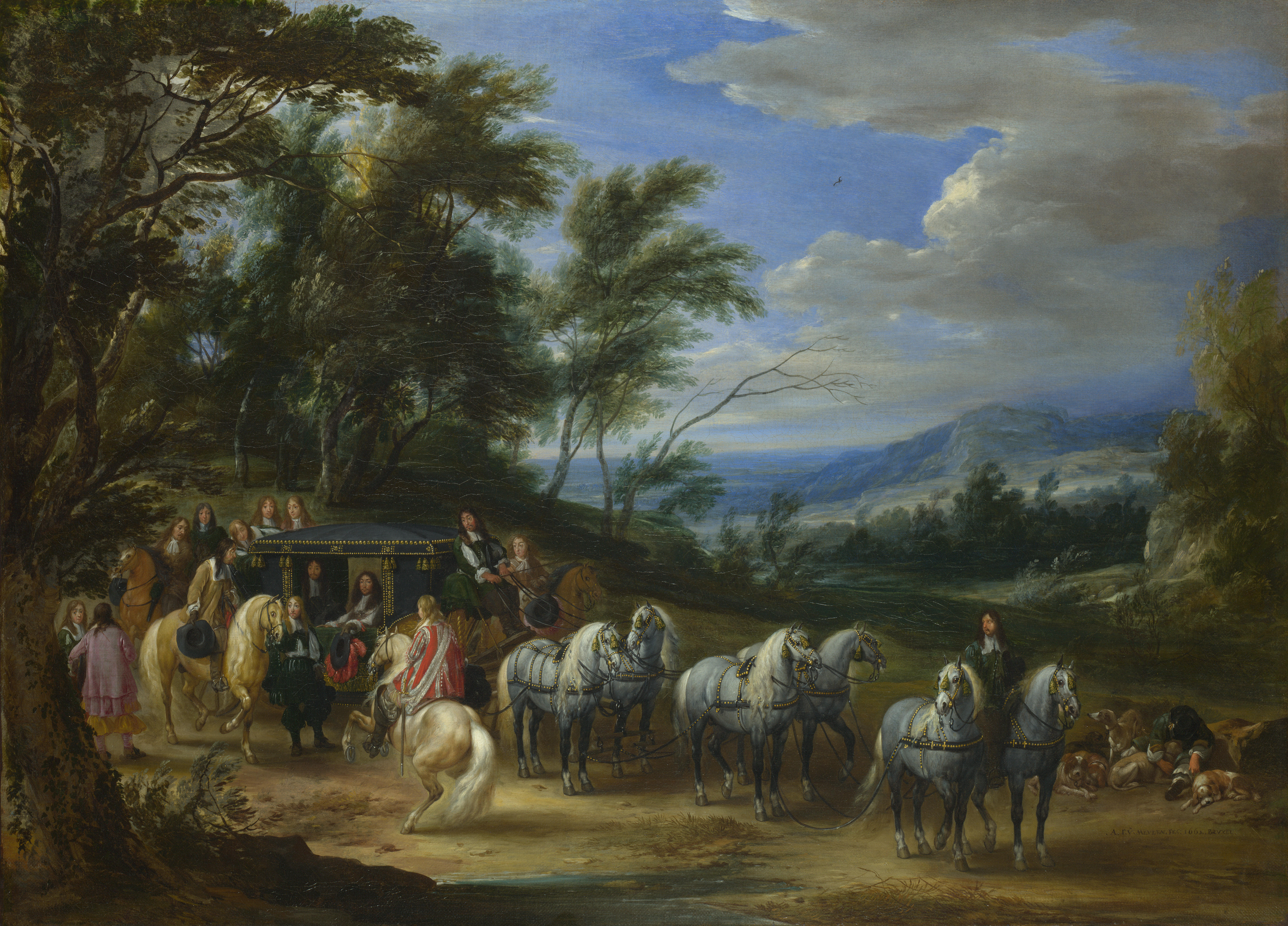
Meeting of Arenberg with his troops, 1662, by Adam Frans van der Meulen

Philippe François de Ligne, (30 July 1625 - 17 December 1674), 7th Duke of Aarschot, 1st Duke of Arenberg, a Knight of the Order of the Golden Fleece, was the first son of the second marriage of Philippe Charles, Comte d'Arenberg and Isabelle Claire de Berlaymont.

On 14 July 1642 Philippe François married 15-year-old Magdalena de Borja y Doria, the elder sister of Ana Francisca de Borja y Doria. In 1646, aged 21, Philippe was made a Knight of the Order of the Golden Fleece.

Their children:

1. François of Arenberg (5 September 1643 - 10 September 1643).
2. Isabelle Claire Eugénie of Arenberg (12 July 1644 - 5 October 1655).

When he died in December 1674, the title passed to his half-brother, Charles Eugene, Duke of Arenberg, (1633–1681), who was promoted to become a Knight of the Order of the Golden Fleece in 1678.
