= Léopold Philippe, 4th Duke of Arenberg =

Austrian field marshal

Leopold Philippe d'Arenberg
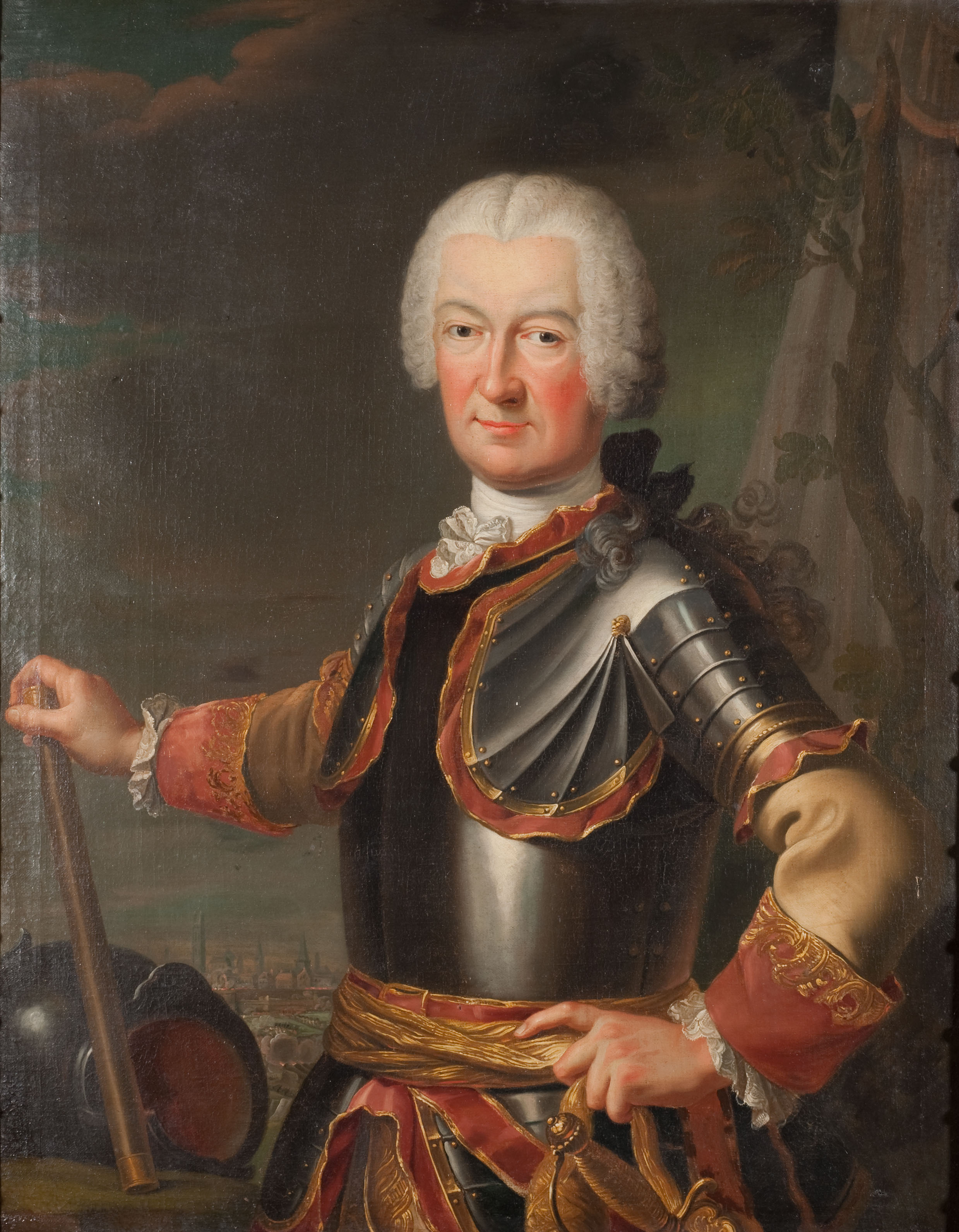
- Born: 14 October 1690; Brussels
- Died: 4 March 1754 (aged 63); Arenberg Castle near Leuven
- Spouse(s): Marie-Françoise Pignatelli, princess of Bisaccia and countess d'Egmont (m. 1711)

Leopold Philippe of Arenberg (14 October 1690 – 4 March 1754) was the 4th Duke of Arenberg, 10th Duke of Aarschot and an Austrian field marshal.

== Biography ==
Leopold Philippe was the son of Duke Philippe Charles d'Arenberg, who fell in the Battle of Slankamen against the Turks on 19 August 1691, when Leopold Philippe was just one year old.
He fought in the War of Spanish Succession in 1706, including the battle of Malplaquet and in the Austro-Turkish War of 1716–18 as General-major in Hungary. He distinguished himself during the Battle of Belgrad, leading the infantry on the right wing.

In 1718, he became governor of Hainaut in the Austrian Netherlands.

At the outbreak of the War of Polish Succession against the French, he served again under Eugene of Savoy on the Rhine. He became Field Marshal in 1737 and was appointed Supreme Commander of the Austrian forces in the Netherlands.

During the War of Austrian Succession, he forged a military alliance between Austria, Britain and the Netherlands. He led the Austrian Army in the Battle of Dettingen.

After the war he returned to the governorship of Hainaut and died in 1754 in his Arenberg Castle in Heverlee.

He was an advocate of science, a friend of Voltaire and mecenas of Jean-Jacques Rousseau.

On 20 March 1711 he married Marie-Françoise Pignatelli, princess of Bisaccia and countess d'Egmont.

They had six children, amongst whom was Charles Marie Raymond, 5th Duke of Arenberg (1754–1778). Another child was Marie Victoire Pauline d'Arenberg, wife of August Georg Simpert, Margrave of Baden-Baden. A third one, Marie Flore, was the wife of Jean Charles Joseph, Count of Merode, Marquis of Deynze. Together with this son-in-law and the Duke of Ursel, Leopold became one of the co-directors of the Théatre de la Monnaie in 1750–1752.
