= Louis Engelbert, 6th Duke of Arenberg =

German nobleman

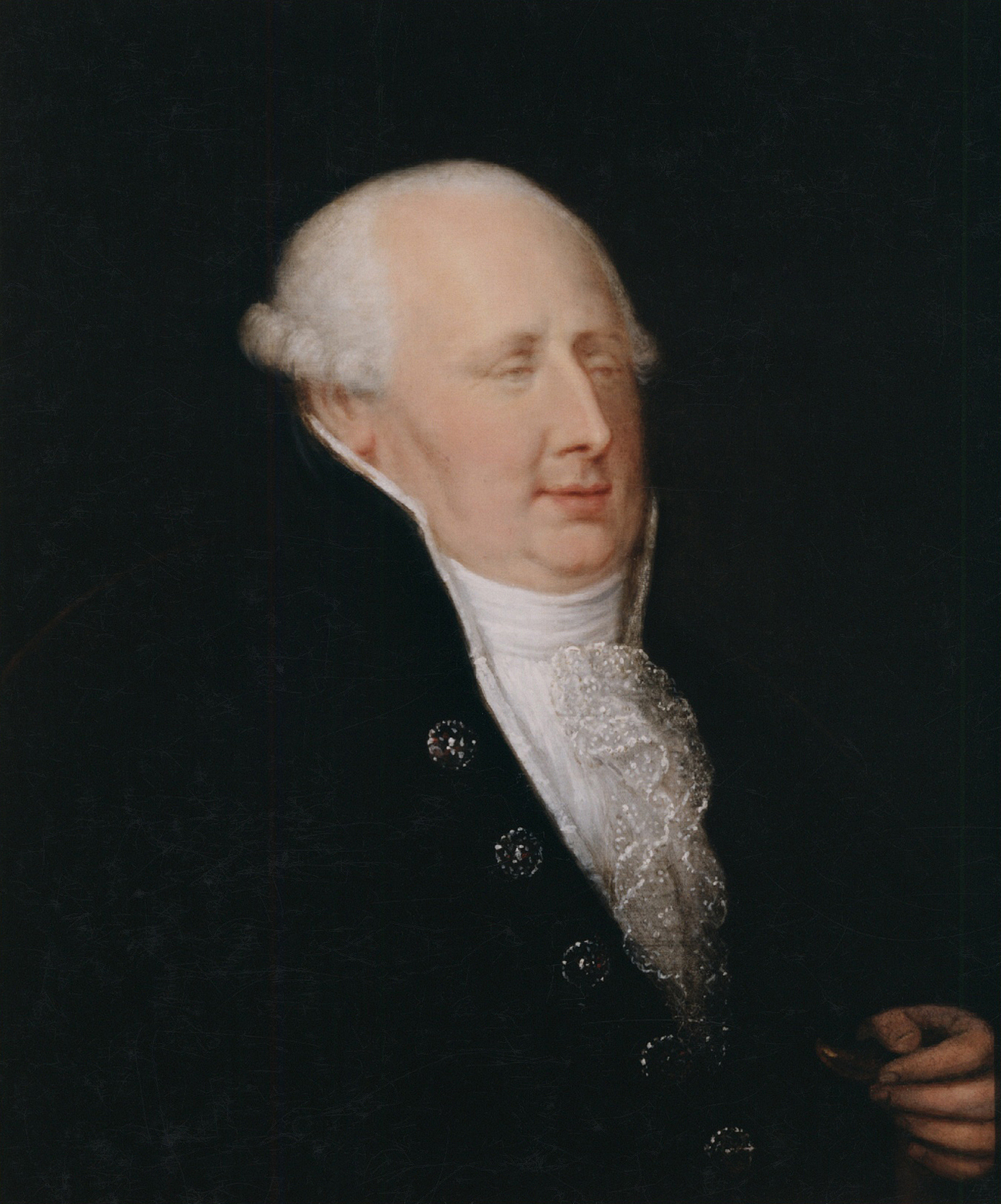
Louis Engelbert, 6th Duke of Arenberg, c.1815; by Pierre Joseph Célestin François

Louis Engelbert of Arenberg (3 August 1750 in Brussels – 7 March 1820 in Brussels), nicknamed the blind duke, was between 1778 and 1801 the sixth Duke of Arenberg and 12th Duke of Aarschot. Between 1803 and 1810 he ruled a Duchy in North-western Germany also called Duchy of Arenberg.

== Biography ==
He was born in Brussels as son of Charles Marie Raymond of Arenberg, one of the most prominent nobles in the Austrian Netherlands, and Louise Margaret von der Mark und Schleide.

At the age of 24, during a hunting party, he was hit in the face by a shotgun and remained blind for the rest of his life. Unable to pursue the usual military career, he turned to science, art and music.
Under his patronage, the first manned gas-filled balloon flight in history took off from the front lawn of the Arenberg Castle on 21 November 1783; the balloonist was professor Jan Pieter Minckeleers.

At the beginning of the French Revolution, he succeeded in keeping his possessions, but when Bonaparte annexed the Rhineland, he lost most of his territories. In the Reichsdeputationshauptschluss of 1803 though, he was compensated with Recklinghausen and Meppen, together also named the Duchy of Arenberg. In 1810 he abdicated in favor of his son Prosper Louis.

Louis Engelbert was named senator by Napoleon and a count of the First French Empire. After 1815, he returned to Belgium, where the Duchy of Arenberg was restored to the family by the Congress of Vienna, be it without the sovereignty of before.

== Marriage and children ==
Ludwig Engelbert married Louise Antoinette de Brancas-Villars, Countess of Lauragais, daughter of Louis-Léon de Brancas, Duke of Villars and Elisabeth-Pauline de Gand, Princess d'Isenghien. They had six children:

- Pauline (1774–1810), married Prince Josef Johann of Schwarzenberg (1769–1833)
- Louis Engelbert (1777)
- Prosper Louis 7th Duke of Arenberg (1785–1861), his successor
- Philemon Paul Maria (1788–1844), Bishop of Namur
- Pierre d'Alcantara Charles (1790–1877), since 1828 French Duke and Peer, married Alix Marie Charlotte of Talleyrand-Périgord (1808–1842)
- Philipp Joseph (1794–1815)
