= Philippe Charles, 3rd Duke of Arenberg =

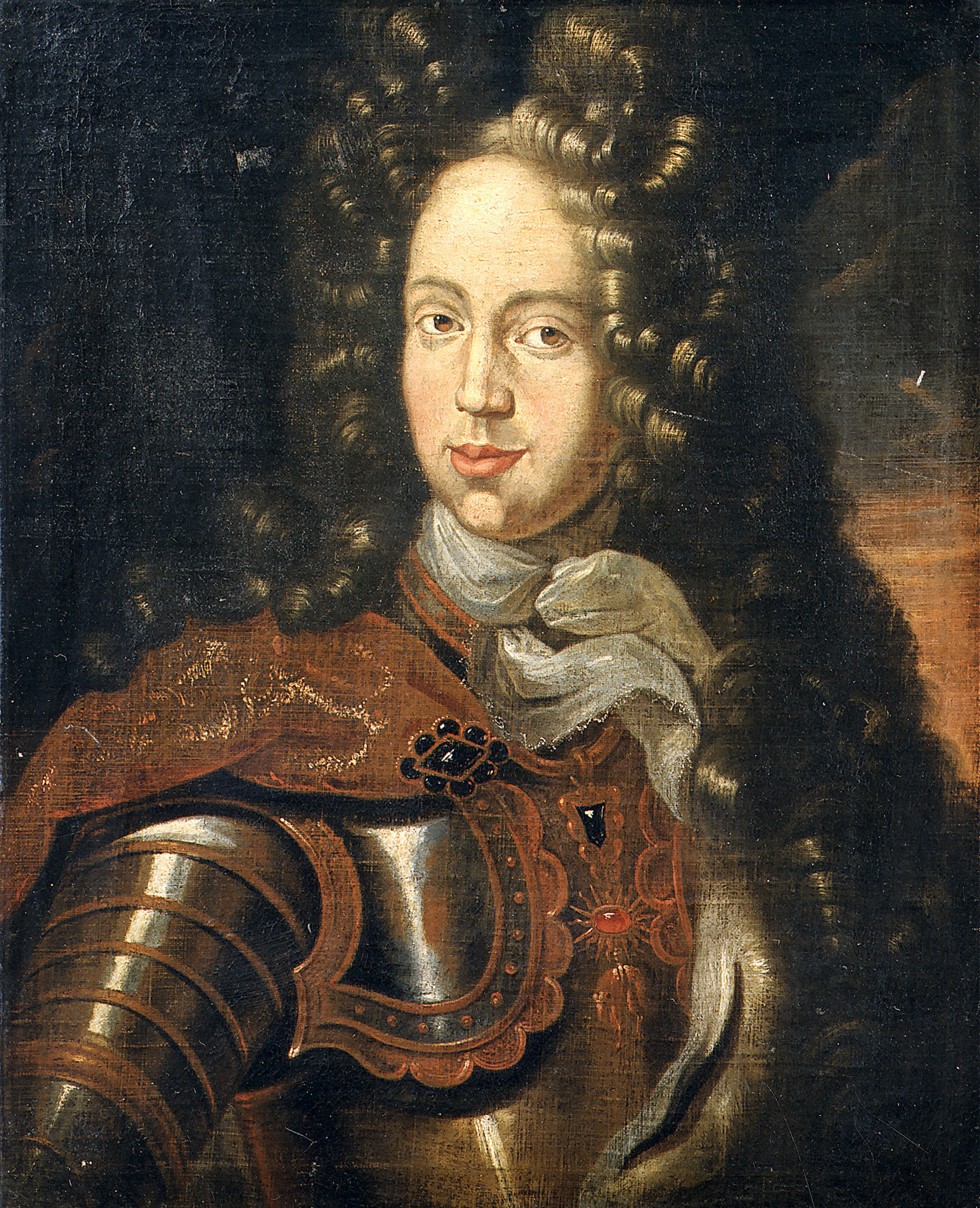
Philippe Charles d'Arenberg

Philippe Charles François, 3rd Duke of Arenberg (10 May 1663 — 25 August 1691) was also the 9th Duke of Aarschot.

He became a knight of the Order of the Golden Fleece in 1685. Like his father, Charles Eugene, 2nd Duke of Arenberg, he was Grand-Bailiff and Captain-General of Hainaut. The youngest general in the imperial army at the Battle of Slankamen (in modern-day Vojvodina, Serbia), he died from his wounds on 19 August 1691.

He married Maria Enrichetta del Carretto, Marchesa de Grana e Savona in Italy, in 1684. He was succeeded by their son, Leopold Philippe d'Arenberg, as the 4th Duke of Arenberg, whose descendants include the current line of the Prince-Dukes of Arenberg, as well as Elisabeth of Bavaria, Empress of Austria and Leopold III of Belgium, through the 4th Duke's great-granddaughter, Princess Amélie Louise of Arenberg, who married into the Wittelsbach family.

His daughter Marie Anne (1689–1736) married François Egon de La Tour, Count d'Auvergne and Margrave of Berg-op-Zoom, a French prince étranger and nephew of the Marshal of France Turenne. Marie Anne's daughter Marie Henriette de La Tour d'Auvergne, Margravine of Berg-op-Zoom married John Christian, Count Palatine of Sulzbach, and was the mother of Charles Theodore, Elector of Bavaria.

== See also ==
- List of knights of the Golden Fleece
