= Charles Eugene, 2nd Duke of Arenberg =

Charles-Eugène Léon
- 2nd Duke of Arenberg
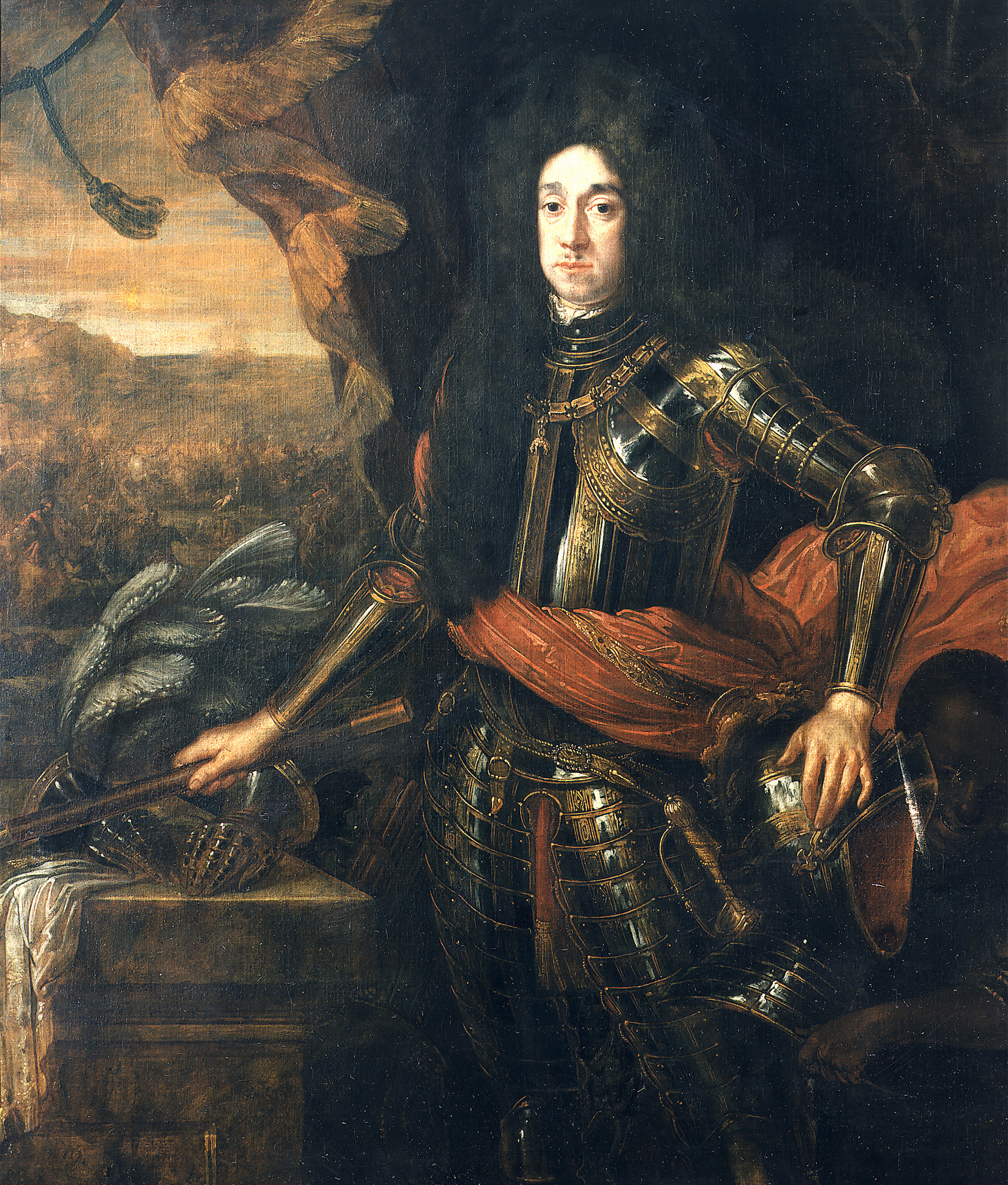
- Tenure: 17 December 1674 – 25 June 1681
- Predecessor: Philippe François, 1st Duke of Arenberg
- Successor: Philippe Charles, 3rd Duke of Arenberg
- Full name: Charles-Eugène Léon d'Arenberg
- Other titles: 8th Duke of Aerschot; Duke of Croÿ; Prince of Porcean; Count of Senegham; Baron of Sevenbergen
- Born: 8 May 1633; Brussels, Duchy of Brabant, Spanish Netherlands
- Died: 25 June 1681 (aged 48); Mons, County of Hainaut, Spanish Netherlands
- Wars and battles: Franco-Spanish War (1635–1659): Battle of Arras (1654)
- Spouse: Marie-Henriette de Cusance
- Issue: Philippe Charles, 3rd Duke of Arenberg; Alexandre
- Father: Philippe-Charles, 3rd Count of Arenberg
- Mother: Marie Cleopha de Hohenzollern-Sigmaringen

Governor of the Franche-Comté
- In office 1668–1671
- Monarch: Charles II
- Regent: Mariana of Austria
- Valido: Juan Everardo Nithard; Fernando de Valenzuela
- Governor of the Spanish Netherlands: Francisco de Moura; Íñigo Melchor de Velasco
- President of the Supreme Council of Flanders: Luis de Benavides Carrillo; Francisco de Moura
- Preceded by: Philippe de la Baume-Saint-Amour
- Succeeded by: Jerónimo de Benavente

Personal details
- Awards: Order of the Golden Fleece

Military service
- Allegiance: (Spain) Spanish Empire; Franche-Comté
- Rank: Lieutenant-general

Charles Eugene, 2nd Duke of Arenberg (8 May 1633 – 25 June 1681), a Knight of the Order of the Golden Fleece since 1678, became 2nd Duke of Arenberg on the death of his half-brother Philippe François, 1st Duke of Arenberg.

== Biography ==
Charles Euguene was born as the younger son of Philippe-Charles, 3rd Prince of Arenberg by his third wife, Countess Maria Cleopha von Hohenzollern-Sigmaringen. The original title, Prince of the Holy Roman Empire, had been awarded to the family on 6 June 1644, by Habsburg Emperor Ferdinand III, Holy Roman Emperor, making the Principality of Arenberg a Duchy of the Holy Roman Empire.

== Personal life ==
He married Marie-Henriette de Cusance, marquise de Varambon in 1660. Their two sons Philippe Charles François, 3rd Duke of Arenberg and Alexandre, fell in battle in 1691 and 1683 respectively. He was Grand-Bailiff and Capitaine-Général of Hainaut.

== See also ==
- List of knights of the Golden Fleece
