= List of protected heritage sites in Enghien =

This table shows an overview of the protected heritage sites in the Walloon town Enghien. This list is part of Belgium's national heritage.

Object	Year/architect	Town/section	Address	Coordinates	Number^{?}	Image
Church of Saint Nicolas ^{(nl)} ^{(fr)}		Edingen		50.693119°N 4.039163°E	55010-CLT-0002-01 Info	Kerk Saint Nicolas More images
Jonathas house ^{(nl)} ^{(fr)}		Edingen	rue d'Hoves, n° 7	50.693298°N 4.038159°E	55010-CLT-0003-01 Info	Huis Jonathas More images
House Algoet or Renard: facade ^{(nl)} ^{(fr)}		Edingen	rue de Bruxelles, n° 15	50.693711°N 4.040067°E	55010-CLT-0004-01 Info	Huis Algoet of Renard: gevel
Building "Entrée du château ': main facade ^{(nl)} ^{(fr)}		Edingen	rue du Château	50.691915°N 4.039367°E	55010-CLT-0005-01 Info	Gebouw "Entrée du château": hoofdgevel More images
Bridge "Pont de la Dodane" and surrounding areas ^{(nl)} ^{(fr)}		Edingen	rue d'Hoves	50.693001°N 4.031421°E	55010-CLT-0006-01 Info	
The old buildings at the entrance to Enghien Gardens, including the former stables, pavilion Edouard, the door, the chapel and the pavilion called "Pavillon des Sept Etoiles" and the ensemble of castle, outbuildings and adjacent areas ^{(nl)} ^{(fr)}		Edingen		50.692184°N 4.040844°E	55010-CLT-0008-01 Info	De oude gebouwen aan de ingang van het terrein van het kasteel van Enghien, met inbegrip van de voormalige stallen, het paviljoen Edouard, de deur, de kapel en het paviljoen genaamd "Pavillon des Sept Etoiles" en het ensemble van het kasteel, de bijgebouwen en de aangrenzende terreinen
Chinese pavilion in the park of castle Arenberg ^{(nl)} ^{(fr)}		Edingen		50.689941°N 4.040854°E	55010-CLT-0009-01 Info	Chinees paviljoen in het park van kasteel Arenberg
Arenberg Castle Park ^{(nl)} ^{(fr)}		Edingen		50.690665°N 4.041935°E	55010-CLT-0011-01 Info	Park van kasteel Arenberg More images
House called "du Paradis" ^{(nl)} ^{(fr)}		Edingen	rue du Château n° 25	50.691623°N 4.039141°E	55010-CLT-0013-01 Info	Huis genoemd "du Paradis" More images
Augustinian monastery: chapel (and his furniture), convent (ground floor), wing in the corner of rue de la fontaine Augustins and walls and roof side garden to street frontage, facade on rue du bâtiment ancien ^{(nl)} ^{(fr)}		Edingen	rue des Augustins	50.692230°N 4.037374°E	55010-CLT-0014-01 Info	Augustijner klooster: kapel (en diens meubilair), klooster (begane grond), vleugel in de hoek van rue de Augustins en rue la fontaine (gevels en dak zijtuin), voorgevel aan straatkant, gevel aan rue du bâtiment ancien More images
Convent of the Colettine Poor Clares: chapel (wall), portal, square tower and tower ^{(nl)} ^{(fr)}		Edingen	rue des Augustins n° 2	50.692978°N 4.036881°E	55010-CLT-0015-01 Info	Klooster van de Clarissen Colletines: kapel (gevel), portaal, vierkante toren en toren More images
Municipal park with ice-cellar and "motte of Brabant", between the streets Albert Ier and Elisabeth ^{(nl)} ^{(fr)}		Edingen		50.693136°N 4.040890°E	55010-CLT-0016-01 Info	
House of old convent: facades and roofs ^{(nl)} ^{(fr)}		Edingen	rue du Béguinage n°10	50.691260°N 4.035922°E	55010-CLT-0017-01 Info	Huis van oud begijnhof: gevels en daken
St. Martin's Church ^{(nl)} ^{(fr)}		Marcq Edingen		50.692321°N 4.017807°E	55010-CLT-0018-01 Info	Kerk Saint-Martin
Windmill and forest called "Moulin de Coqjan" ^{(nl)} ^{(fr)}		Edingen		50.697655°N 4.080073°E	55010-CLT-0019-01 Info	
Old fortifications of the avenue between street Albert Ier and Street Bruxelles ^{(nl)} ^{(fr)}		Edingen		50.694176°N 4.041500°E	55010-CLT-0020-01 Info	
House: walls and roofs ^{(nl)} ^{(fr)}		Edingen	rue d'Hérinnes n° 12	50.693800°N 4.039173°E	55010-CLT-0021-01 Info	Huis: gevels en daken
House: walls and roofs ^{(nl)} ^{(fr)}		Edingen	rue de la Fontaine n° 22	50.692016°N 4.038018°E	55010-CLT-0022-01 Info	Huis: gevels en daken
Watermill and environment ^{(nl)} ^{(fr)}		Edingen	chaussée d'Ath	50.686350°N 4.011569°E	55010-CLT-0023-01 Info	
House called "Le Gouvernement": main building: walls, roof, upholstery and stairs, two extensions: facades and roof, baroque ceiling ^{(nl)} ^{(fr)}		Edingen	rue du Château n° 6	50.692570°N 4.039899°E	55010-CLT-0024-01 Info	Huis genaamd "Le Gouvernement": hoofdgebouw: gevels, dak, bekleding en trap, twee aanbouwen: gevels en dak, barok plafond
House of old convent: facades and roofs ^{(nl)} ^{(fr)}		Edingen	rue du Béguinage n°12	50.691893°N 4.035515°E	55010-CLT-0025-01 Info	
House of old convent: facades and roofs ^{(nl)} ^{(fr)}		Edingen	rue du Béguinage n°14	50.691871°N 4.035535°E	55010-CLT-0026-01 Info	
House of old convent: facades and roofs ^{(nl)} ^{(fr)}		Edingen	rue du Béguinage n°16	50.691843°N 4.035558°E	55010-CLT-0027-01 Info	Huis van oude begijnhof: gevels en daken
House of old convent: facades and roofs ^{(nl)} ^{(fr)}		Edingen	rue du Béguinage n°18	50.691819°N 4.035576°E	55010-CLT-0028-01 Info	
House of old convent: facades and roofs ^{(nl)} ^{(fr)}		Edingen	rue du Béguinage n°26	50.691267°N 4.035896°E	55010-CLT-0029-01 Info	Huis van oude begijnhof: gevels en daken
House of old convent: facades and roofs ^{(nl)} ^{(fr)}		Edingen	rue du Béguinage n°28	50.691246°N 4.035906°E	55010-CLT-0030-01 Info	Huis van oude begijnhof: gevels en daken
House of old convent: facades and roofs ^{(nl)} ^{(fr)}		Edingen	rue du Béguinage n°30	50.691217°N 4.035924°E	55010-CLT-0031-01 Info	Huis van oude begijnhof: gevels en daken
House of old convent: facades and roofs ^{(nl)} ^{(fr)}		Edingen	rue du Béguinage n°32	50.691197°N 4.035942°E	55010-CLT-0032-01 Info	Huis van oude begijnhof: gevels en daken
House of old convent: facades and roofs ^{(nl)} ^{(fr)}		Edingen	rue du Béguinage n°34	50.691172°N 4.035964°E	55010-CLT-0033-01 Info	Huis van oude begijnhof: gevels en daken
House of old convent: facades and roofs ^{(nl)} ^{(fr)}		Edingen	rue du Béguinage n°36	50.691145°N 4.035976°E	55010-CLT-0034-01 Info	Huis van oude begijnhof: gevels en daken
House of old convent: facades and roofs ^{(nl)} ^{(fr)}		Edingen	rue du Béguinage n°38	50.691118°N 4.036002°E	55010-CLT-0035-01 Info	Huis van oude begijnhof: gevels en daken
House of old convent: facades and roofs ^{(nl)} ^{(fr)}		Edingen	rue du Béguinage n°40	50.691089°N 4.036012°E	55010-CLT-0036-01 Info	Huis van oude begijnhof: gevels en daken
The pavilion of Sept Etoiles and the park of Castle Arenberg, limited to the portion of the park, except the golf course ^{(nl)} ^{(fr)}		Edingen		50.687656°N 4.047325°E	55010-PEX-0001-01 Info	Het paviljoen van Sept Etoiles en het park van kasteel Arenberg, beperkt tot het gedeelte van het park, uitgezonderd de golfbaan
Chinese pavilion in the park of castle Arenberg ^{(nl)} ^{(fr)}		Edingen		50.689941°N 4.040854°E	55010-PEX-0002-01 Info	
The buffet and organ of the church Saint-Martin ^{(nl)} ^{(fr)}		Edingen		50.692321°N 4.017807°E	55010-PEX-0003-01 Info	

== See also ==
- List of protected heritage sites in Hainaut (province)
- Enghien
