= Château d'Enghien =

Château d'Enghien may refer to:

- Château d'Enghien (Chantilly) on the grounds of the Château de Chantilly, Oise, France
- Château d'Enghien (Belgium) in Enghien, Wallonia, Belgium.
