= Enghien Gardens =

Coordinates: 50°41′16″N 04°02′50″E

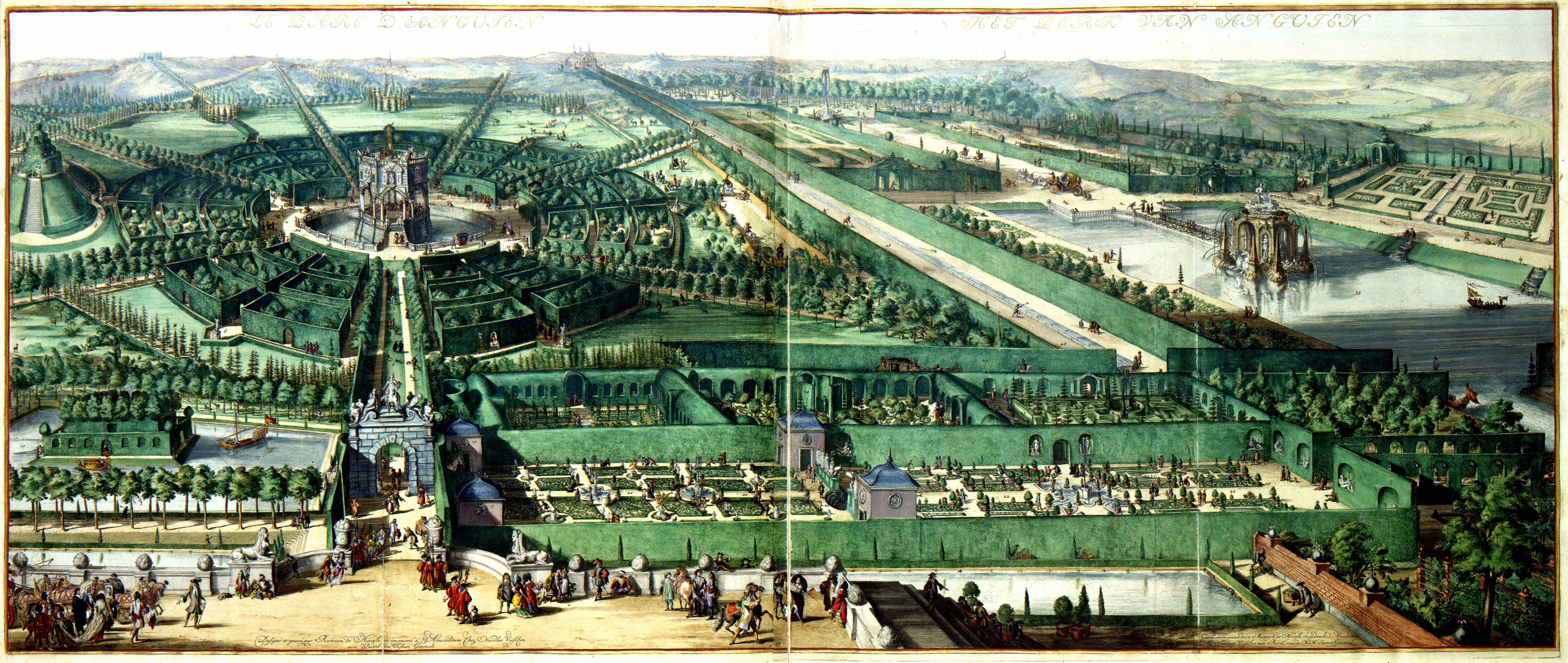
The Enghien Gardens by Romeyn de Hooghe

The Enghien Gardens (French: Parc d'Enghien / Dutch: Park van Edingen) are a domain of 182 hectares in Enghien or 'Edingen', Wallonia, Belgium, created by the dukes of Arenberg in the 17th and 18th century. The park is a green oasis of ponds, gardens and follies. Many considered the gardens a wonder of the world. Nothing remains of the Arenberg castle other than the chapel tower. Within the park, a new château was created in the 20th century. The Enghien municipality acquired the gardens in 1986, and opened them to the public.

== History ==
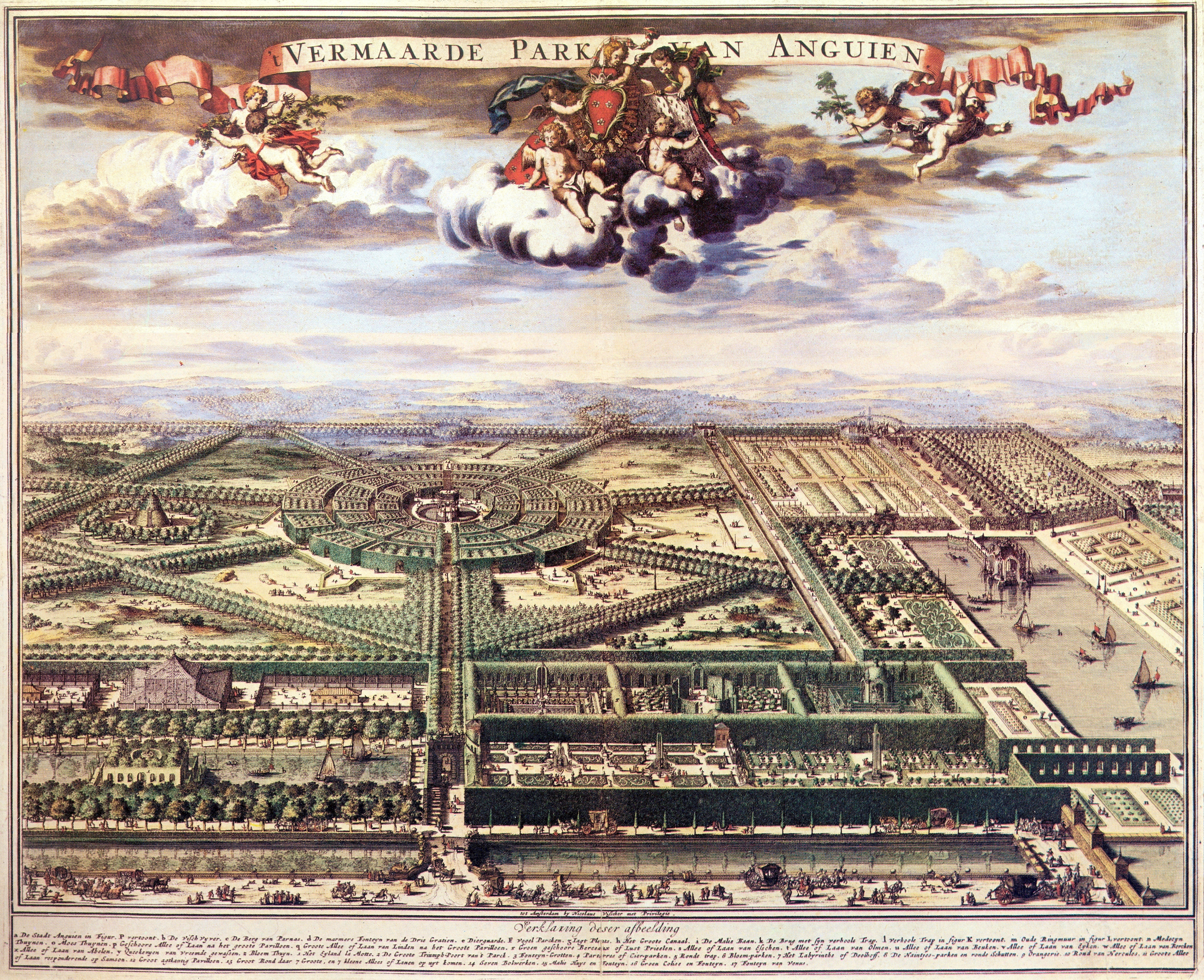
The famous Enghien gardens at the end of the 17th century by Romeyn de Hooghe

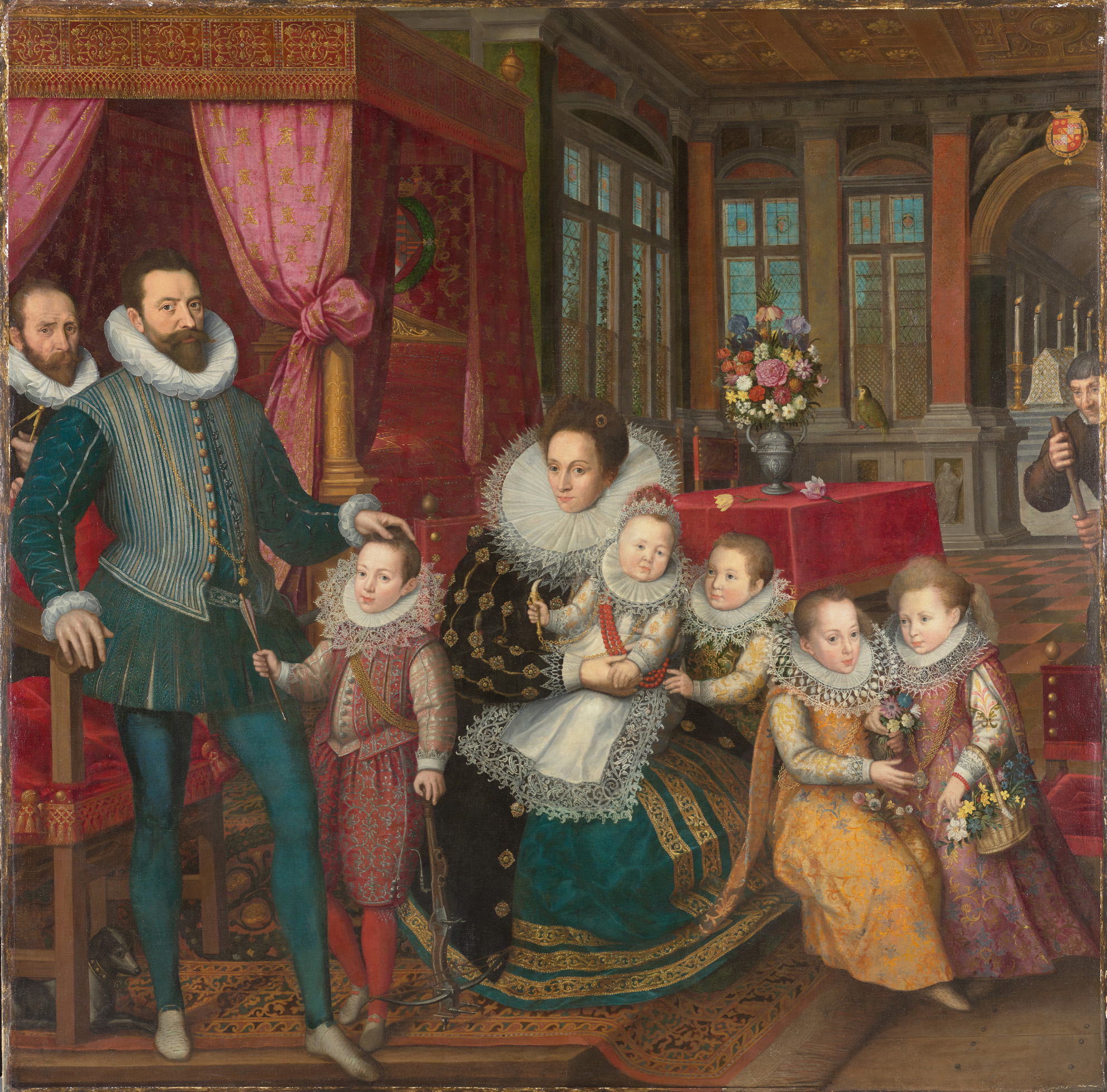
Charles of Arenberg with family

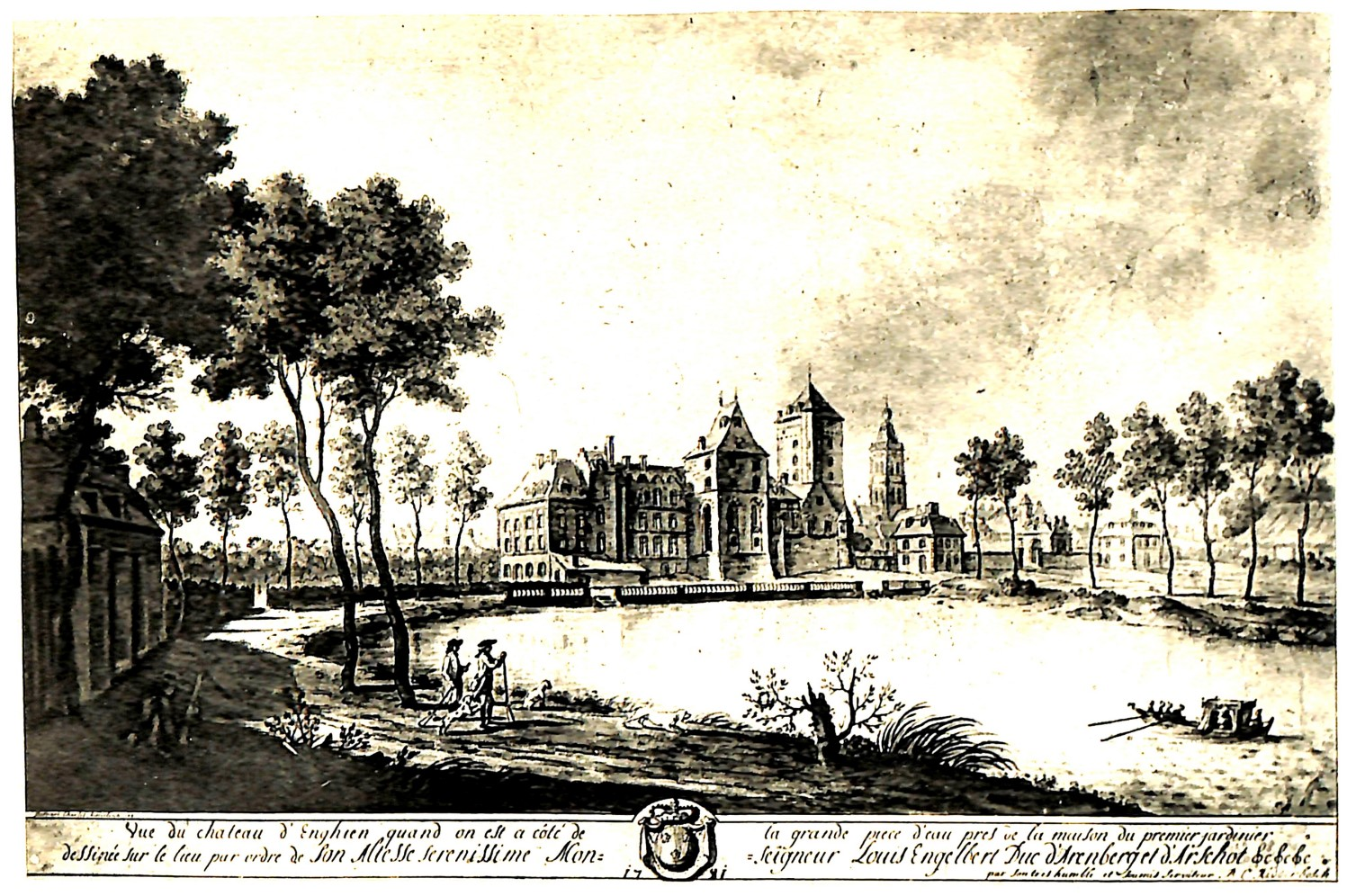
The Château d'Enghien in 1781 by Bernard Charles Ridderbosch

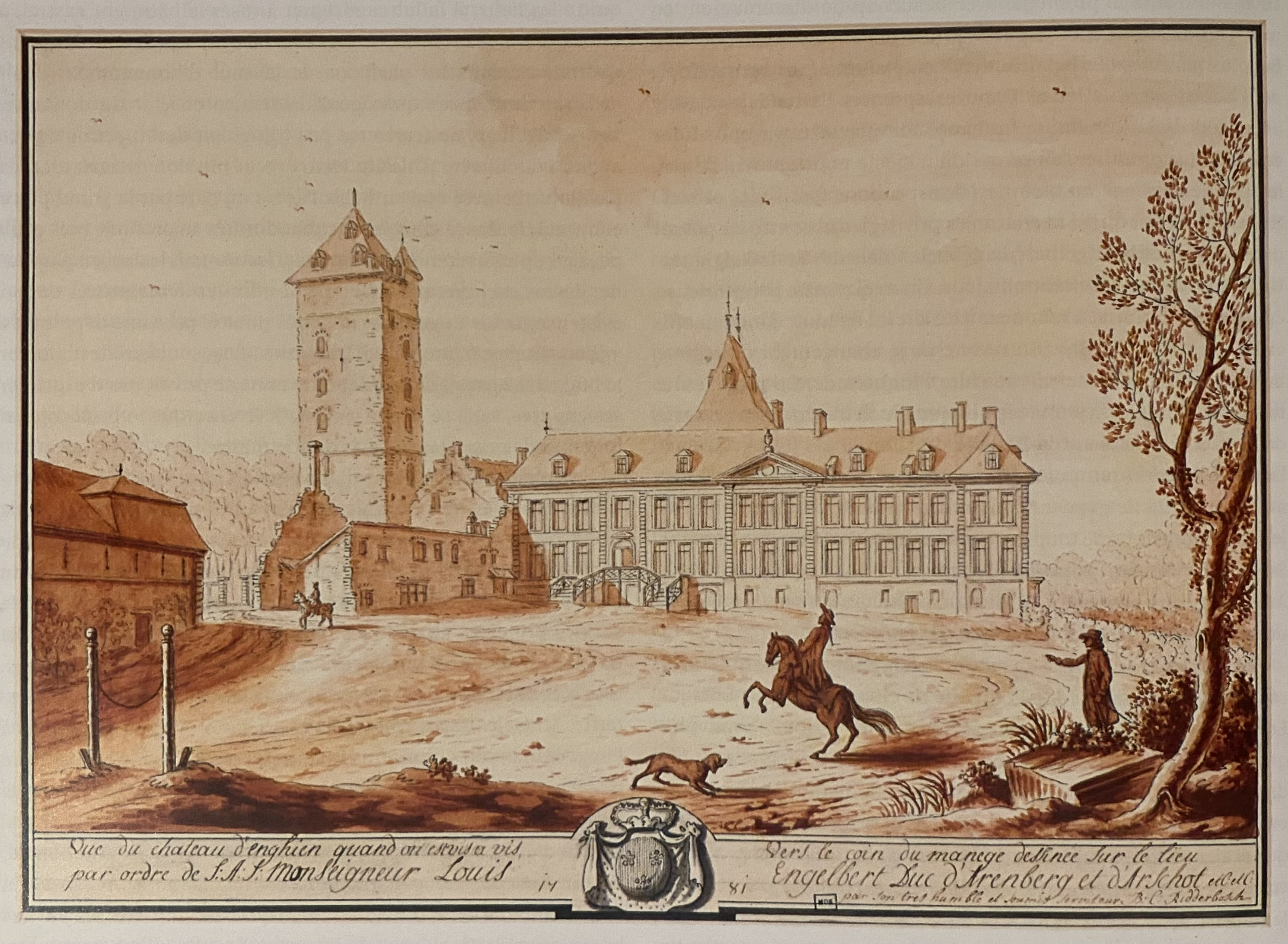
The Château d'Enghien in 1781 by Bernard Charles Ridderbosch. Only the chapel tower at the back remains

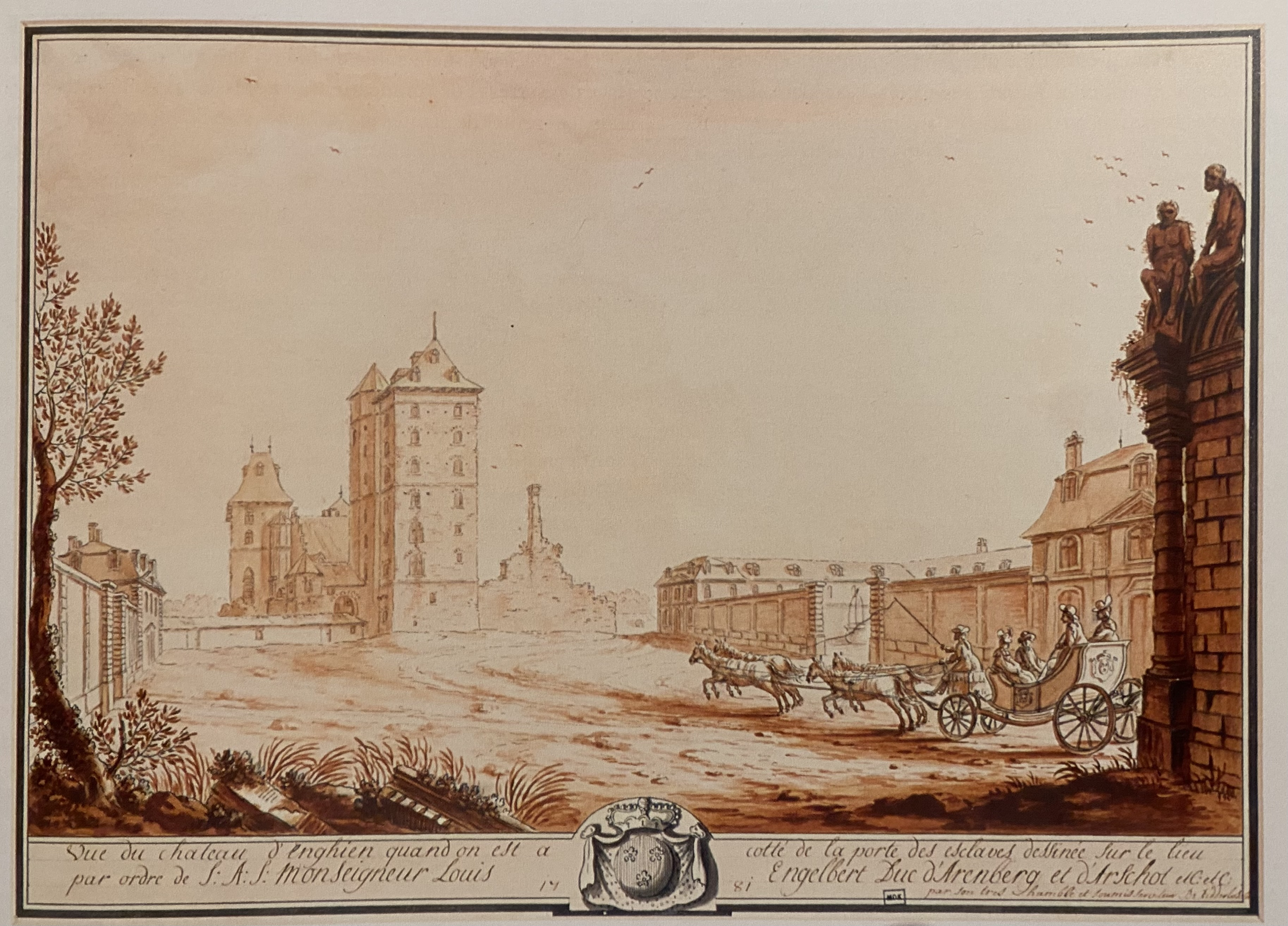
The Château d'Enghien in 1781 by Bernard Charles Ridderbosch. The 18th century stables are on the right

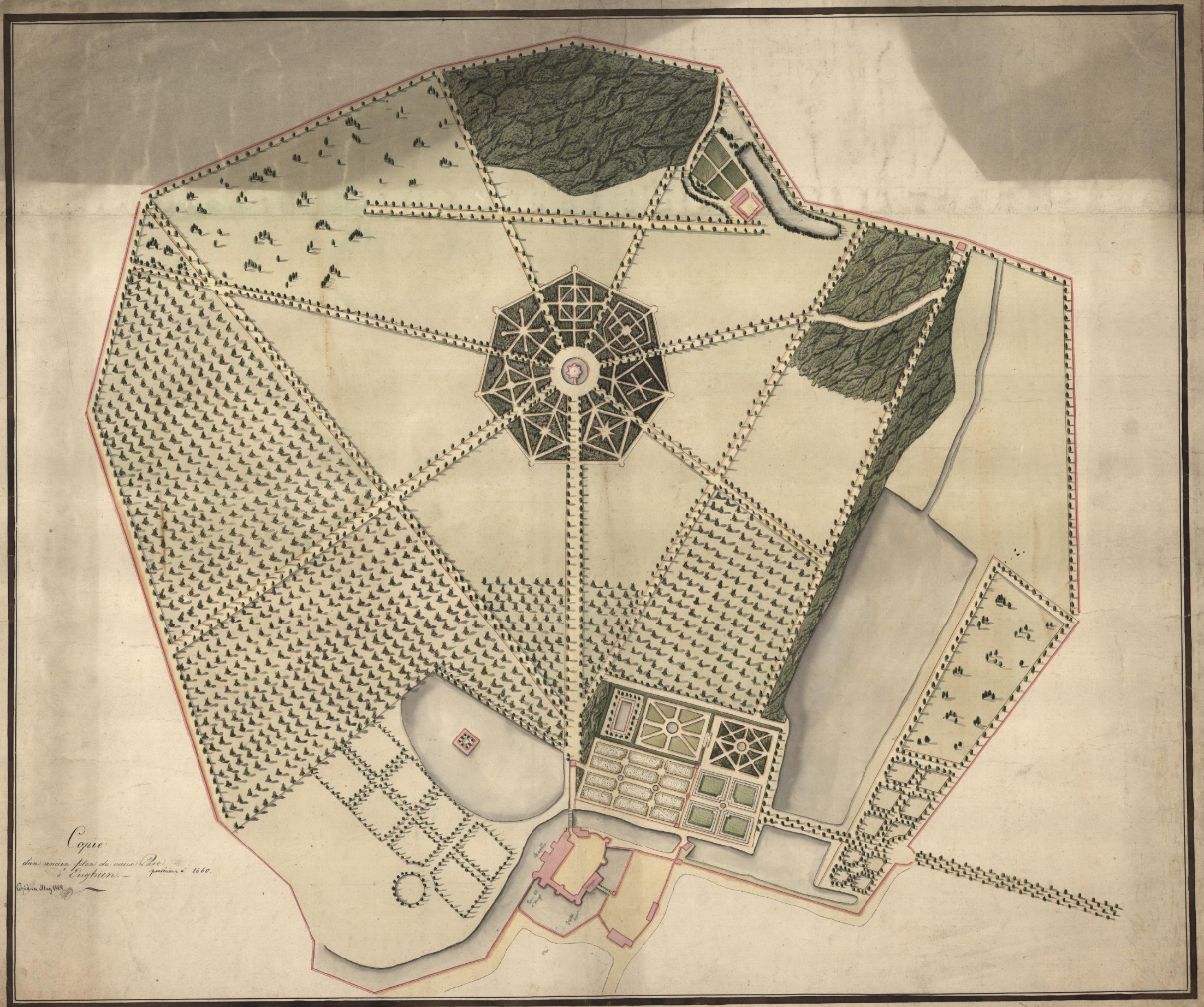
Plan of the Enghien gardens around 1660

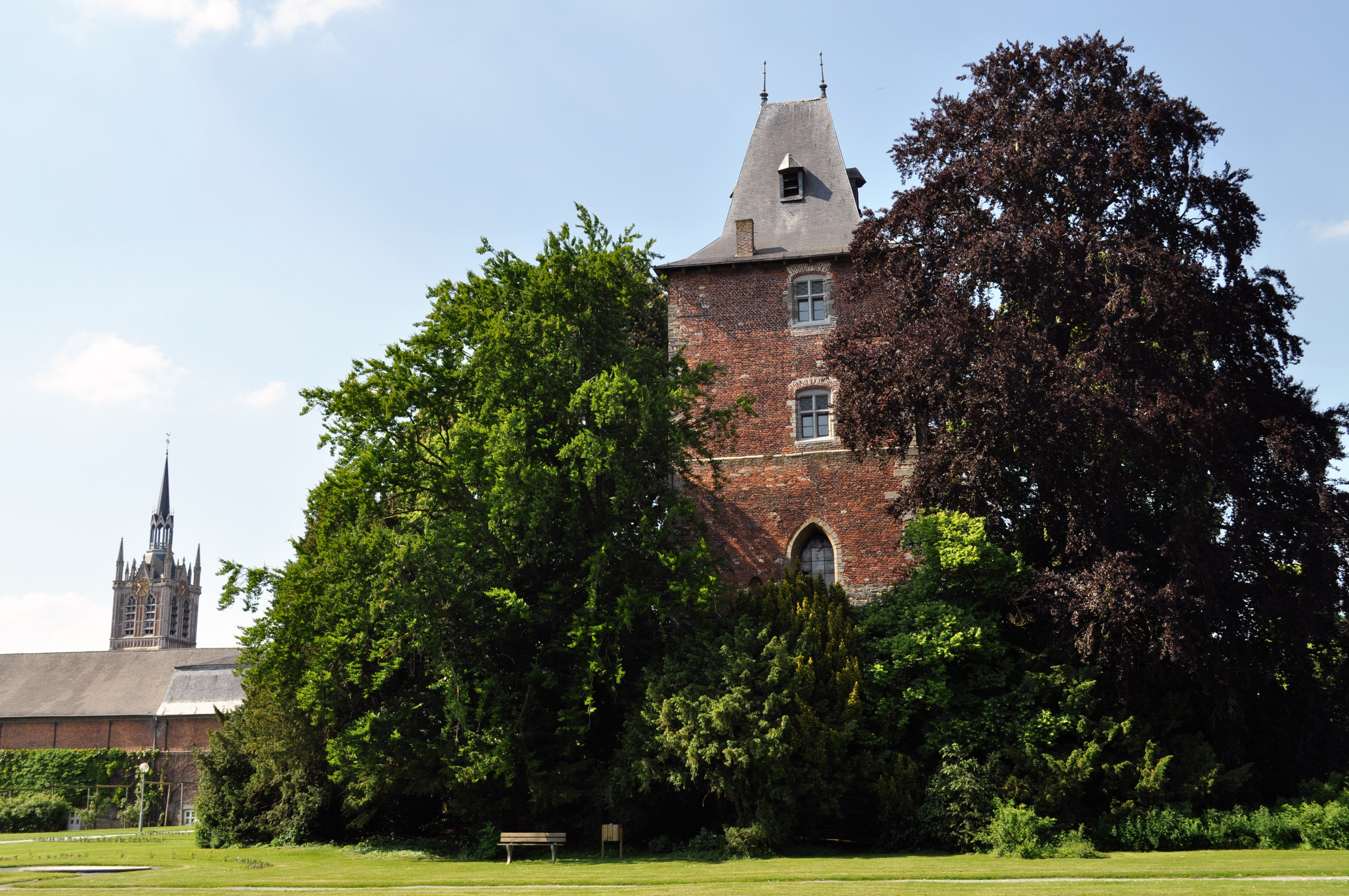
The remaining tower of the Château d'Enghien

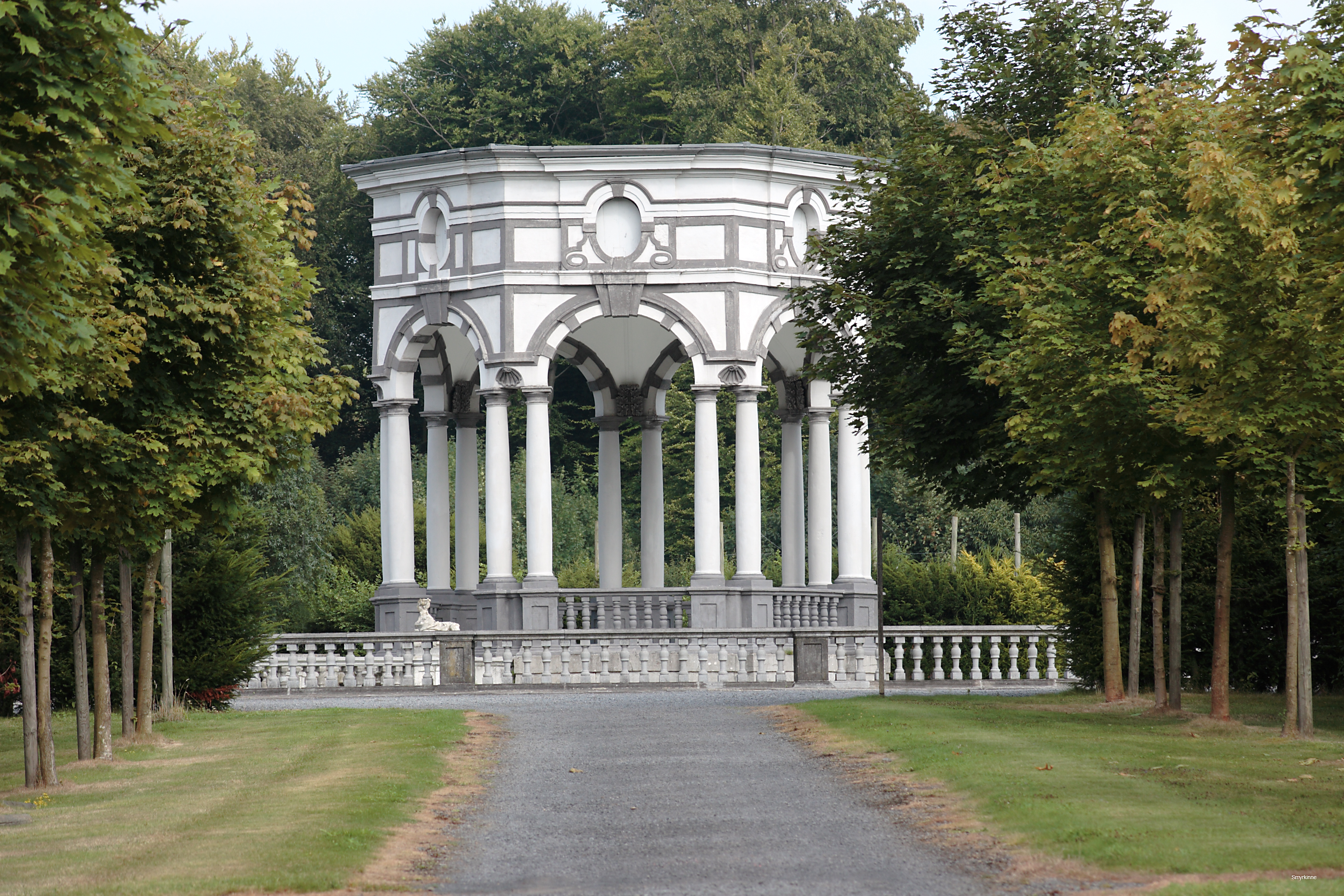
The large pavilion in the center of the gardens

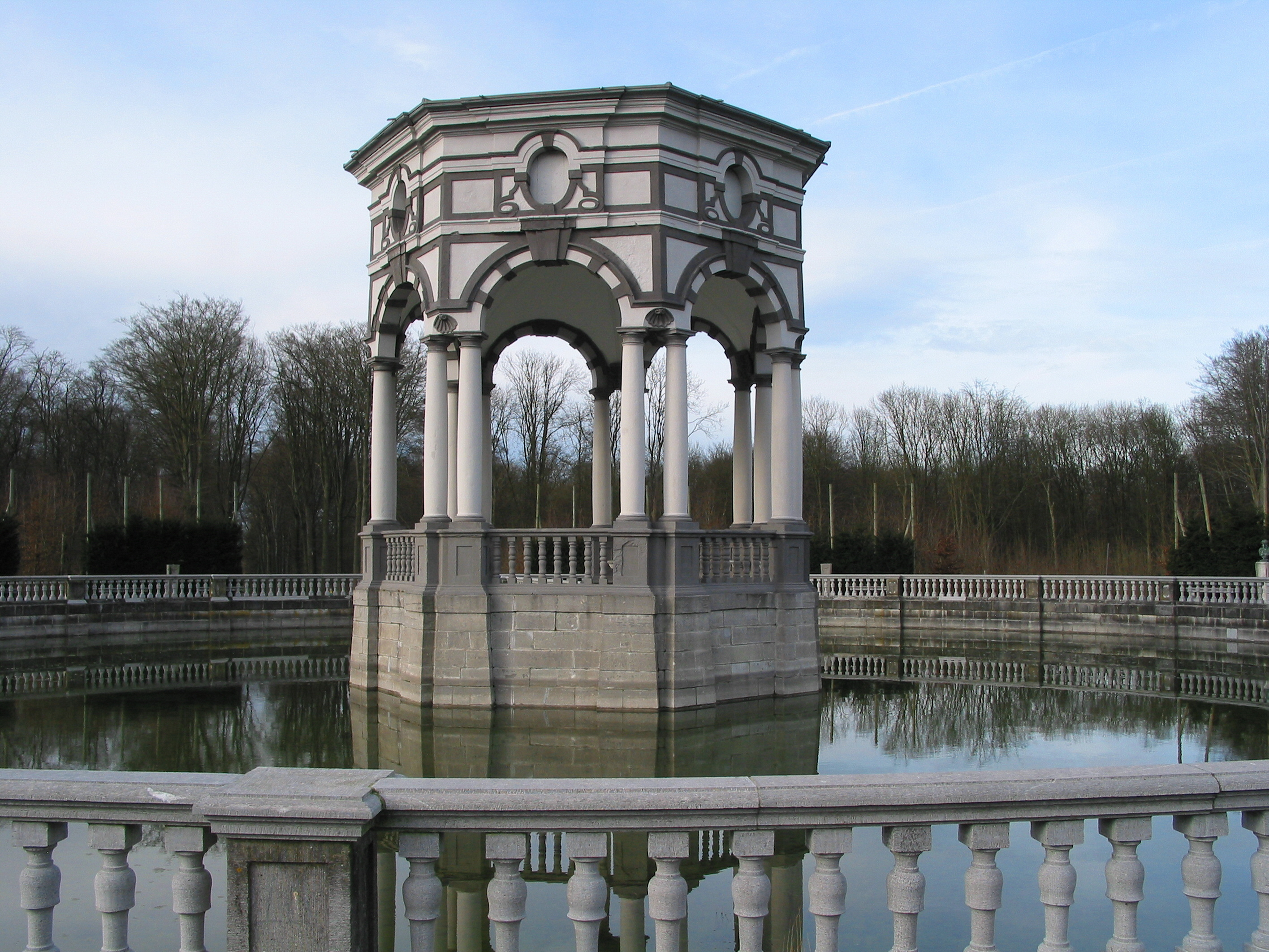
The large pavilion in the center of the gardens

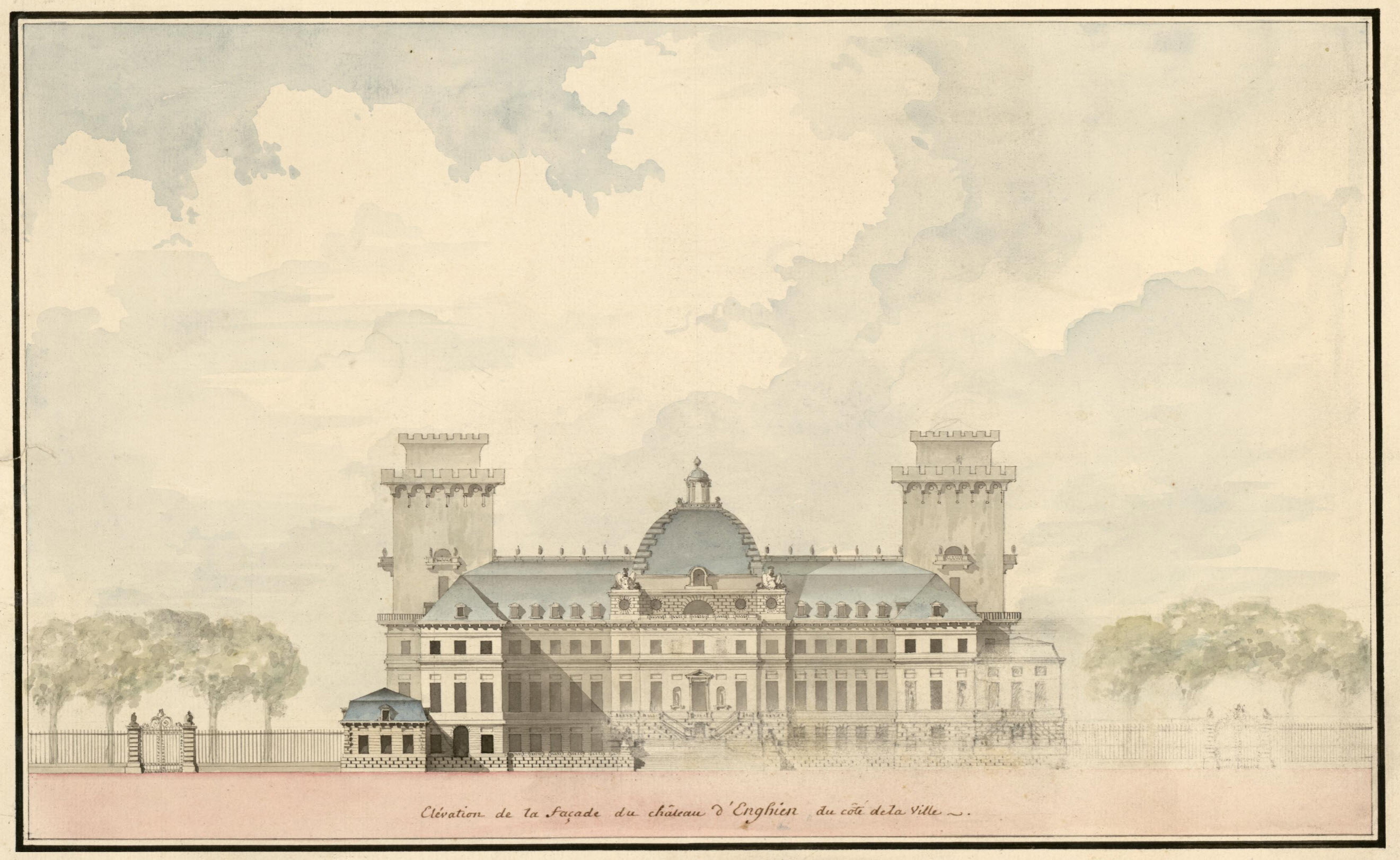
Design for a new château in Enghien by Charles de Wailly (1781)(not realized)

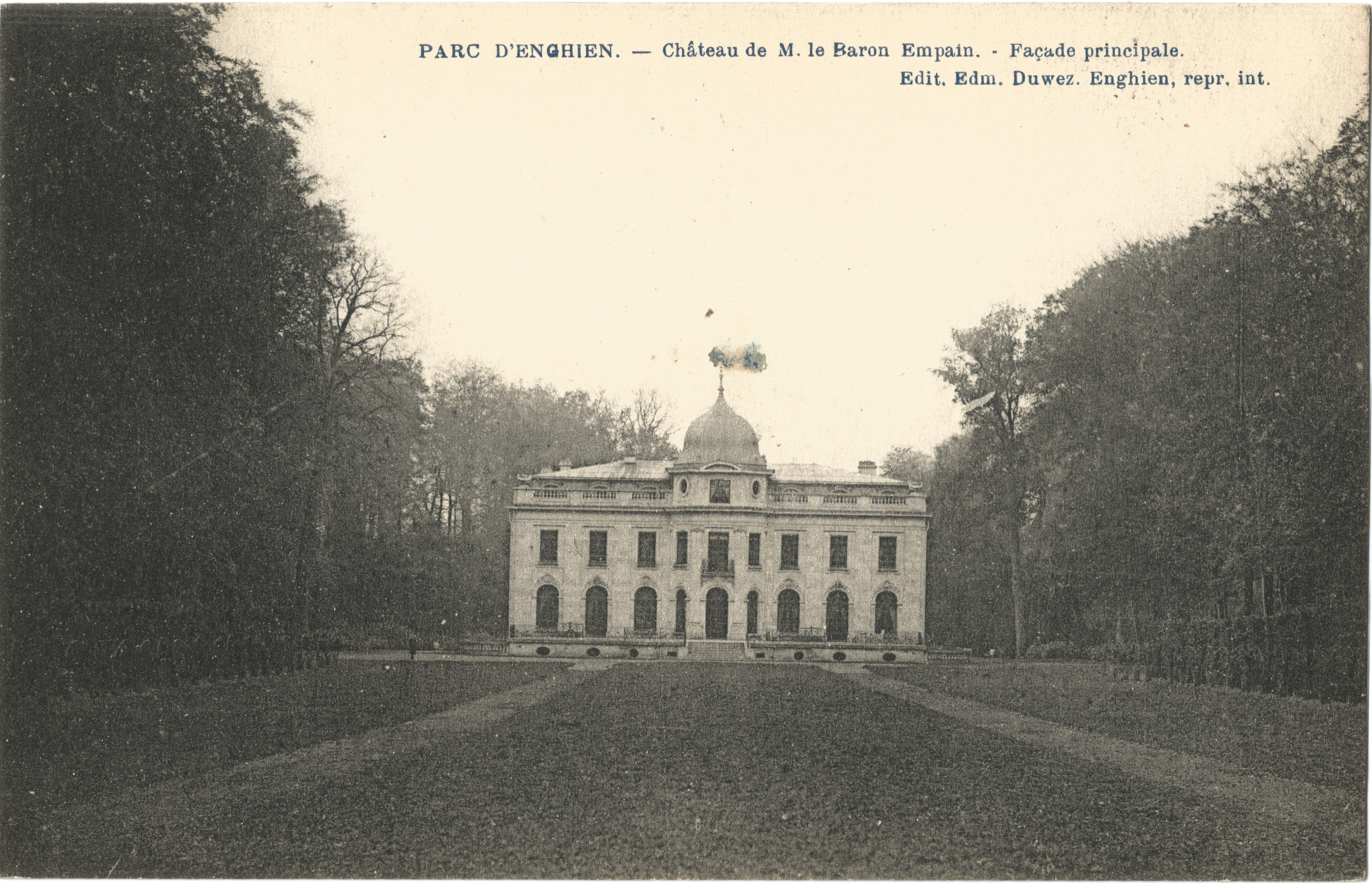
The Château Empain constructed in 1913 before the 1926 extension

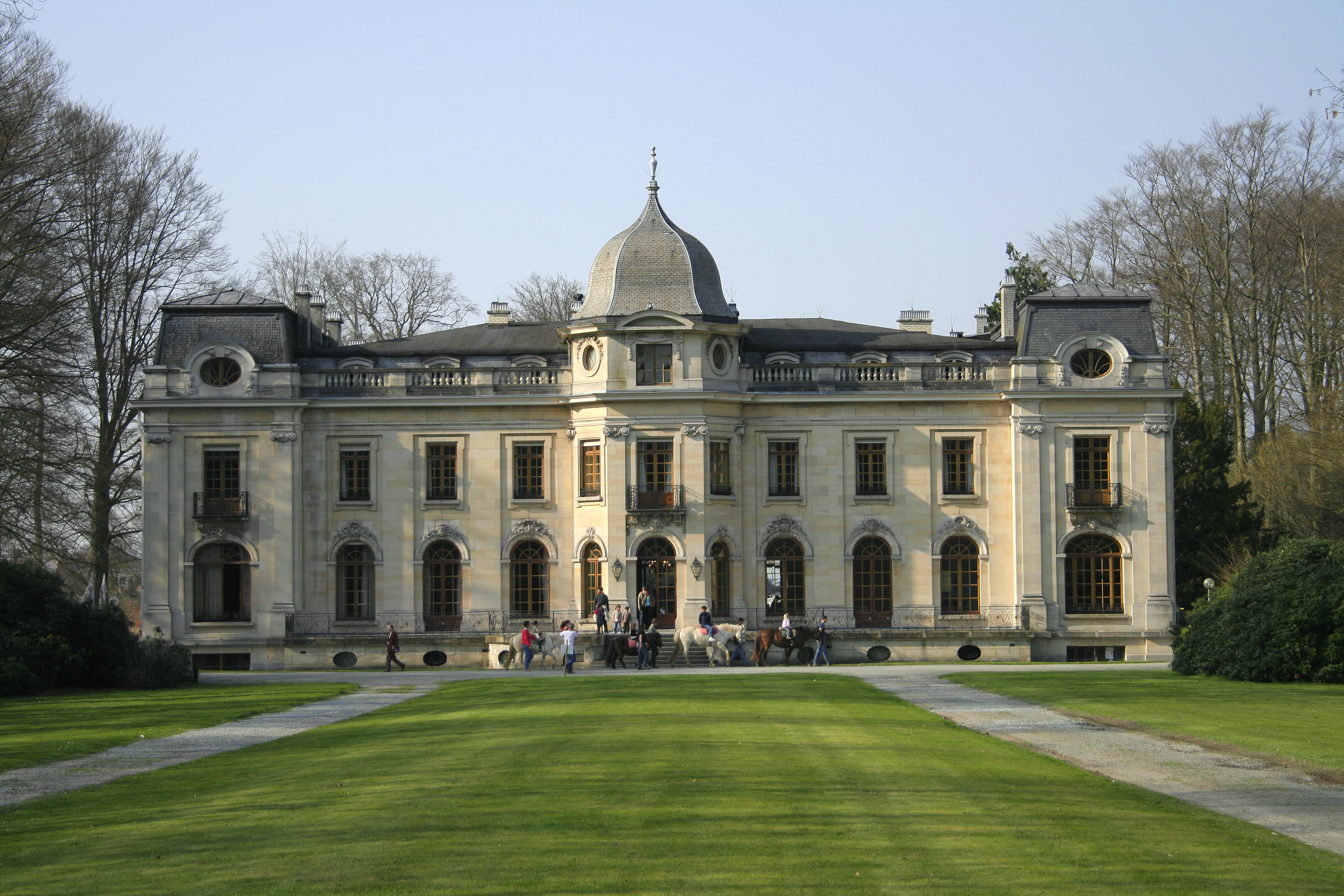
The Château Empain after the 1926 extension

=== Middle ages ===
Around 1167, the first castle was built in Enghien. Shortly thereafter Baldwin V, Count of Hainaut (1150–1195) it in 1194. At the start of the 13th century, a new castle was constructed at the current entrance to the gardens.

=== Renaissance ===
The castle passed by marriage to the counts of Saint-Pol, a branch of the House of Luxembourg. At the start of the 14th century, they created the first gardens and surrounded them with a four-kilometre-long stone wall. Peter II, Count of Saint-Pol (1440–1482) was succeeded by his daughter, Françoise of Luxembourg, who married Philip of Cleves, Lord of Ravenstein (1459–1528). The marriage was celebrated in great style at the castle in 1485. When Françoise died childless in 1523, the castle and gardens went to her sister, Marie of Luxembourg (1472–1527), who was married to a French prince, Francis, Count of Vendôme. When Marie died in 1546, her grandson, Antoine de Bourbon (1518–1562), King of Navarre and Duke of Vendôme, inherited the estate. He did not spend much time at the estate, nor did his son Henry de Bourbon (1553–1610), who later became Henry IV of France. The castle was sold to Charles of Arenberg (1550–1616) on 30 January 1606.

=== Arenberg family ===
The Arenberg family bought the castle and gardens for 270,000 pounds. In 1615, they created a Capuchin monastery within the park. Between 1630 and 1665, they started creating the famous gardens. The plans were drawn up by Antoine of Arenberg, a Capuchin monk.

In 1645, a fire destroyed most of the castle. Rebuilding started immediately with help of the architects Duquesnoy and Petrus Paulus Mercx.

During a visit in 1671, Anne Marie Louise d'Orléans, Duchess of Montpensier was very impressed by the gardens as she wrote in her diary. She was accompanied by the French king Louis XIV, who summoned André Le Nôtre as well. It is said that he gained inspiration for the gardens of Versailles.

Engravings made by Romeyn de Hooghe around 1680 show how the gardens appeared at that time. There were fountains, pavilions, triumphal arches, statues, mountains, an orangery, a theatre, artificial caves and other follies. In the centre of the gardens a seven-sided pavilion was built, which served both as a temple of Hercules and an observatory. The viewing terrace was reached by a movable windlass staircase. The basin around the pavilion contained water that, according to the principle of communicating vessels, provided the necessary water pressure for the fountains and other hydraulic elements in the park. Seven large and seven small alleys departed from the pavilion, each with its own tree species and landscape. The small avenues always led to a "bulwark" where a god statue stood. The whole was imbued with cosmological significance.

Large stables were added in 1719, designed by the architect Heroguelle, that could house up to 78 horses.

During a hunting party in 1775, Louis Engelbert, 6th Duke of Arenberg (1750–1820) was hit in the face by a shotgun and remained blind for the rest of his life. Unable to pursue the usual military career, he turned to science, art and music. He devised big plans for the Enghien gardens. Between 1780 and 1782, the French architect Charles de Wailly designed a sumptuous palace to replace the old castle. However, due to political instability under emperor Joseph II construction did not proceed. The duke decided to build a new country house elsewhere in the park. The design of the house was by Charles de Wailly, but the construction was executed by Louis Montoyer. It was barely finished when it burned down completely on its inauguration day (28 October 1786). De Wailly also designed follies in the gardens, such as Roman ruins, a new herculanum and a temple dedicated to Apollo. These designs also did not go further than the watercolours.

During the French Revolution, the gardens and castle were looted by revolutionaries and fell into decay. When the Arenberg family returned in 1803, the castle was in ruins and they decided to demolish it between 1803 and 1808. Only the chapel tower remains. In 1809, the architect Ghislain Henry built a new porch and administrative buildings.

In the mid-19th century, there was a new period of splendour. Prosper Louis, 7th Duke of Arenberg (1785–1861), a great lover of botany and horticulture, created glasshouses with more than 1,700 species.

=== Modern times ===
The estate remained with the Arenberg family until the end of the First World War, after which they were forced to sell their Belgian estates and palaces, like the Egmont Palace in Brussels and the Arenberg castle in Heverlee near Leuven. Also, the Enghien gardens were sold in 1924. The buyer is François Empain (1862–1935), brother of Édouard Empain, who already rented the estate. He paid much attention to the gardens, and installed many of the statues which are still there today. Also, he constructed a new château bin 1913, which was expanded in 1926. The design was made by the architect Alexandre Marcel.

After Empain's death, the estate was inherited by his family. Upkeep, maintenance and restoration was expensive and in 1986, the gardens were put up for sale. The Enghien municipality acquired the estate and château (182 hectares, which was once 266 hectares). They restored it and opened the gardens for public.

== Literature ==
- Genicot, Luc Francis, ed. (1977). Het groot kastelenboek van België II: Kastelen en buitenplaatsen (in Dutch). Brussel: Vokaer. p. 306.
- Delannoy, Yves (1983). "Deux dessins de B.-C. Ridderbosch représentant le château d'Enghien en 1781 et la démolition de celui-ci (1803 - 1808)". Annales du Cercle Royal Archéologique d'Enghien Tome 21 (PDF) (in French). Enghien: Cercle Royal Archéologique d'Enghien. pp. 163–180.
- Delannoy, Yves (1986). Le Parc et les Fameux Jardins d'Enghien (PDF) (in French). Enghien: Delwarde & Cie.
- Seys, Nadine (1986). Geschiedenis van het park te Edingen, aangelegd door de familie Arenberg, 17de tot en met 19de eeuw (Thesis) (in Dutch). Katholieke Universiteit Leuven.
- Derez, Mark (1996). De blinde hertog. Louis Engelbert van Arenberg en zijn tijd, 1750-1820 (in Dutch). Brussel: Gemeentekrediet. p. 206. ISBN 978-90-5066-164-5.
- Carlier, Francoise; Vandewattyne, Claude (1997). "Le parc d'Enghien". In Matthys, André; Sarlet, Danielle (eds.). Le Patrimoine monumental de la Belgique: Wallonie. Province de Hainaut, arrondissement de Soignies (in French). Liège: Soledi. pp. 295–309. ISBN 978-2-87009-640-6.
- Delannoy, Yves (1999). "Le château et le Parc d'Enghien sous la bannière des Arenberg 1607-1918 : première partie (1607-1640)". Annales du Cercle Royal Archéologique d'Enghien Tome 23 (PDF) (in French). Enghien: Cercle Royal Archéologique d'Enghien. pp. 5–119.
- Vanden Eynden, J.L. (1999). Enghien: le parc d'Arenberg 1666-1999 (Thesis) (in Dutch). Katholieke Universiteit Leuven.
- Roegiers, Jan (2002). Arenberg in de lage landen. Een hoogadellijk huis in Vlaanderen en Holland (in Dutch). Leuven: Universitaire Pers. p. 407. ISBN 978-90-5867-233-9.
- Duquenne, Xavier (2010). "L'architecte De Wailly en Belgique, 1779-1795". In Buys, Joke; Bergmans, Anna (eds.). Een belvedère aan de Schelde. Paviljoen De Notelaer in Hingene (1792 - 1797). Brussel: Vlaams Instituut voor het Onroerend Erfgoed. ISBN 978-90-7523-030-7.
- Duvosquel, Jean-Marie; Morsa, Denis (2011). La Maison d'Arenberg en Wallonie, à Bruxelles et au Grand-Duché de Luxembourg depuis le XIVème siècle. Contribution à l'histoire d'une famille princière (in French). Brussel: Fondation d'Arenberg. ISBN 978-94-6136016-8.

== Gallery of engravings by Romeyn de Hooghe ==
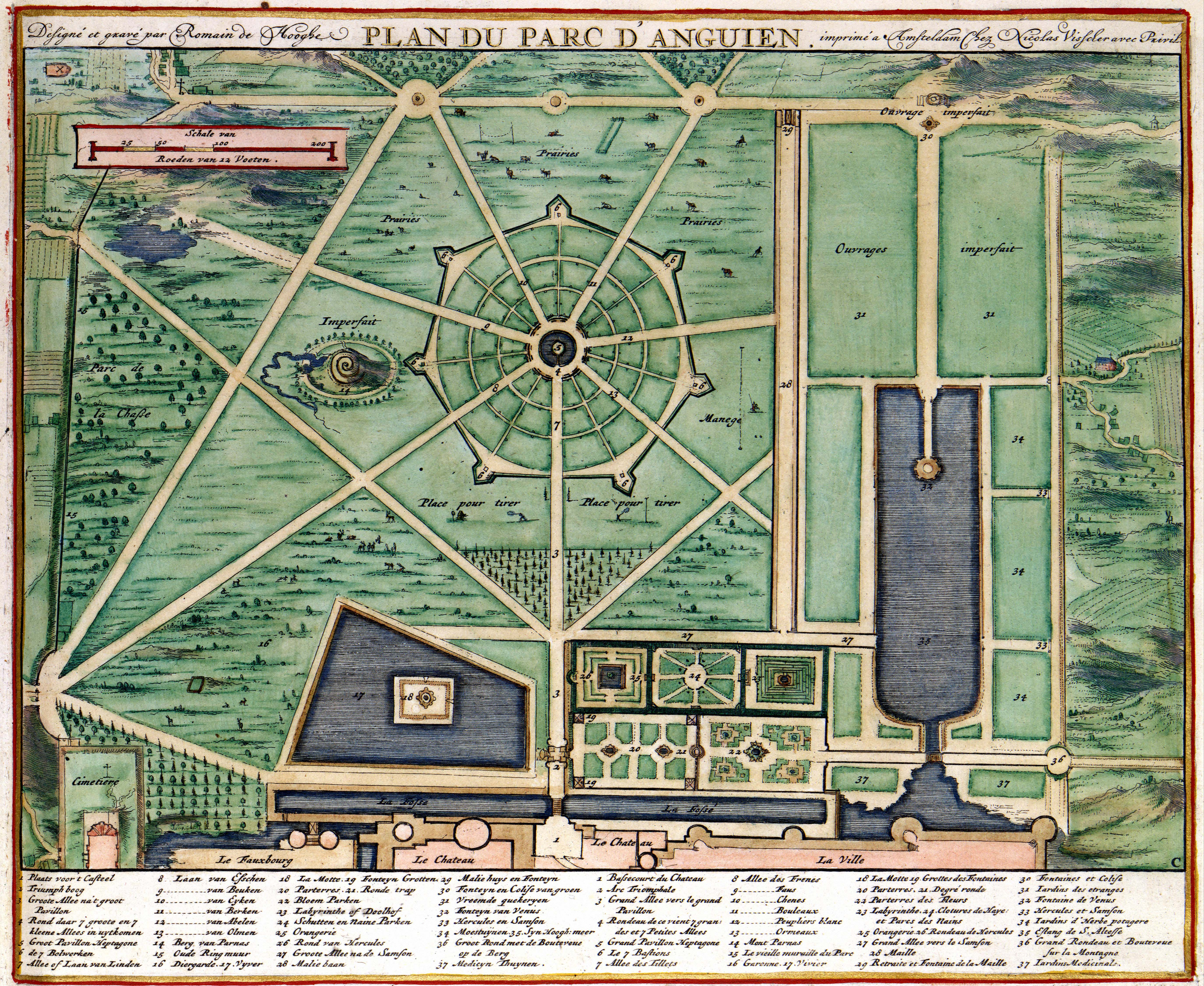
Plan of the Enghien Gardens. The star shape has been preserved, but not the pentagon around it.

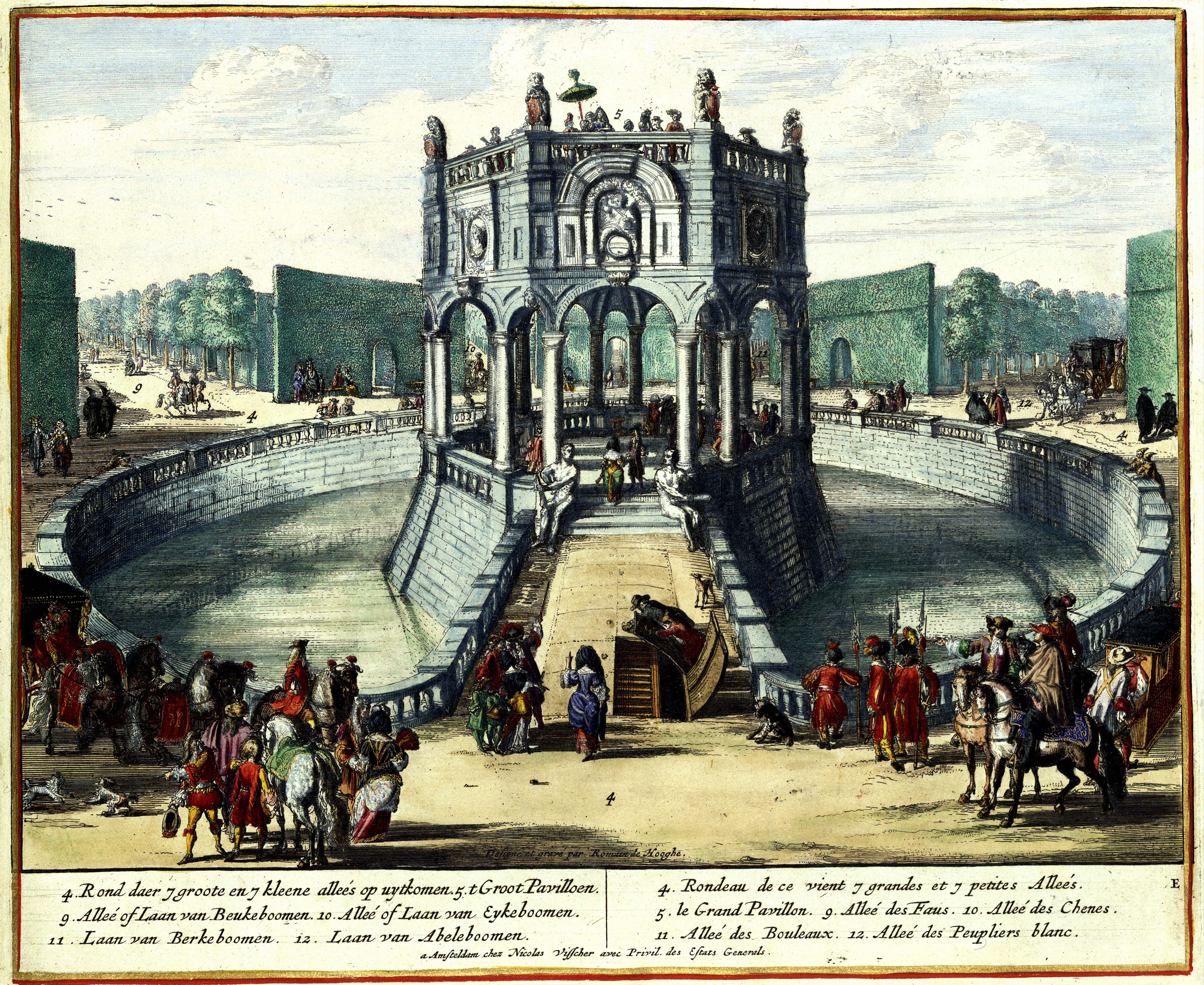
The large pavilion in the centre of the park

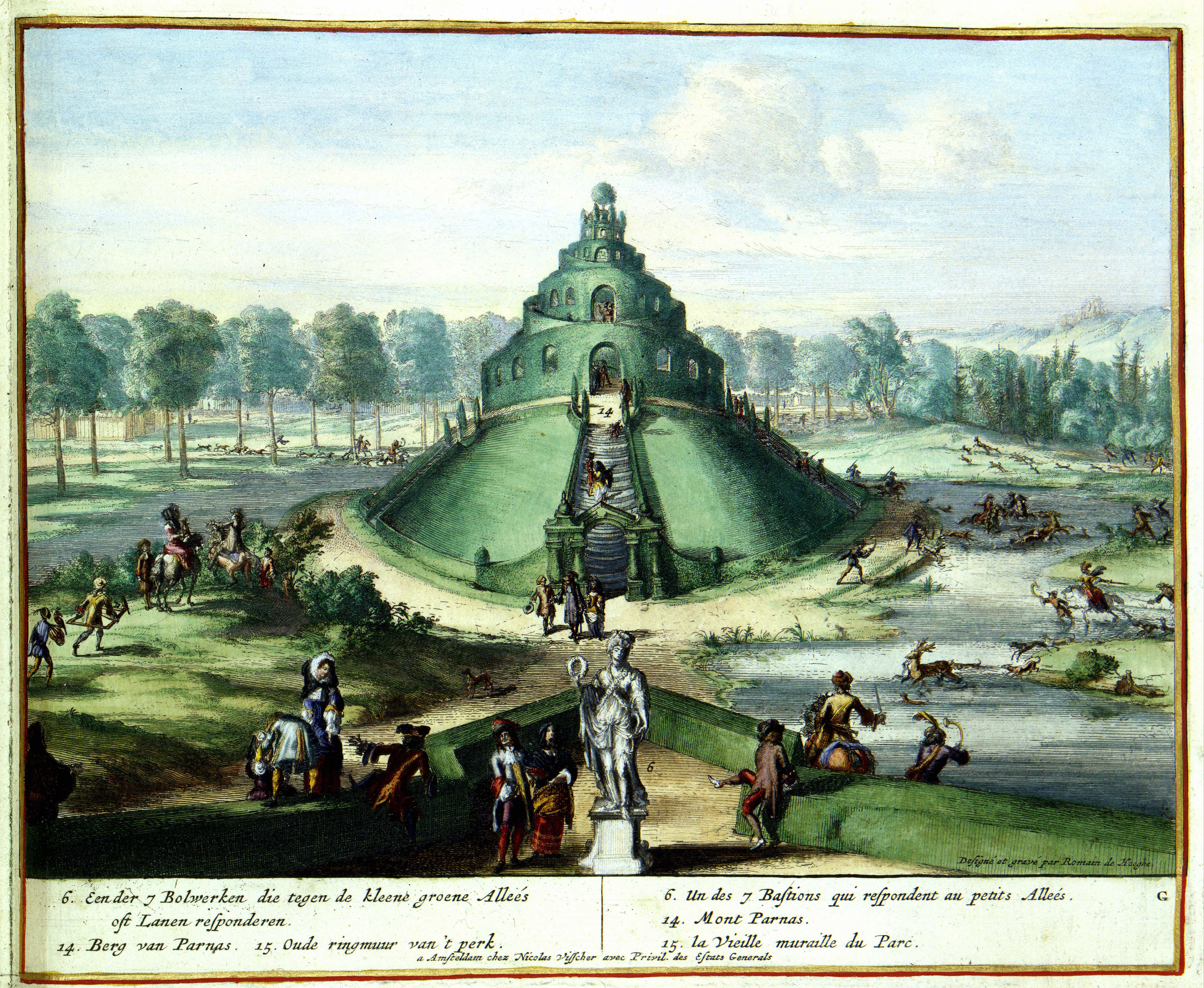
Mount Parnassus

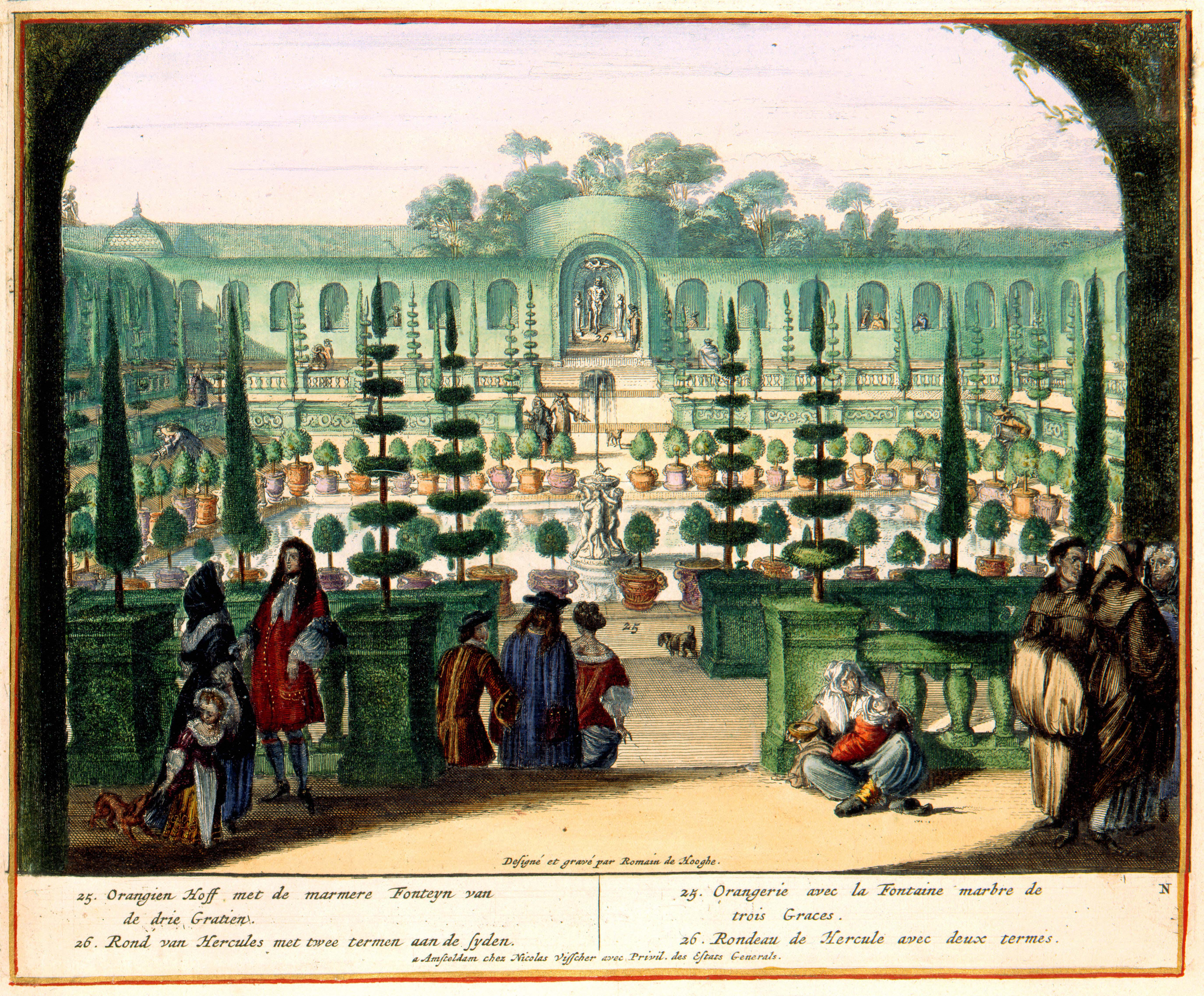
Orangery with fountain dedicated to the Charites and a statue of Hercules

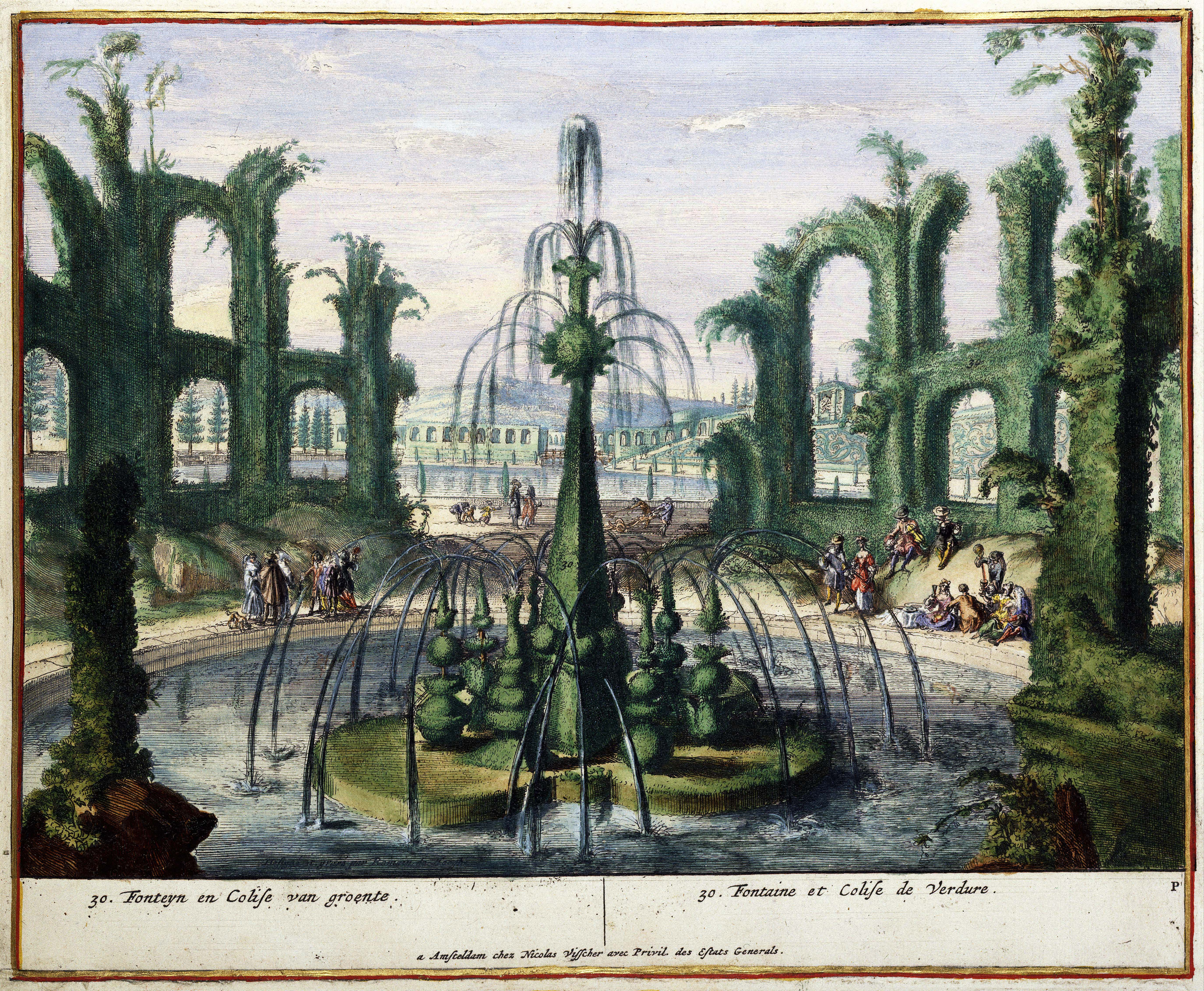
Fountain

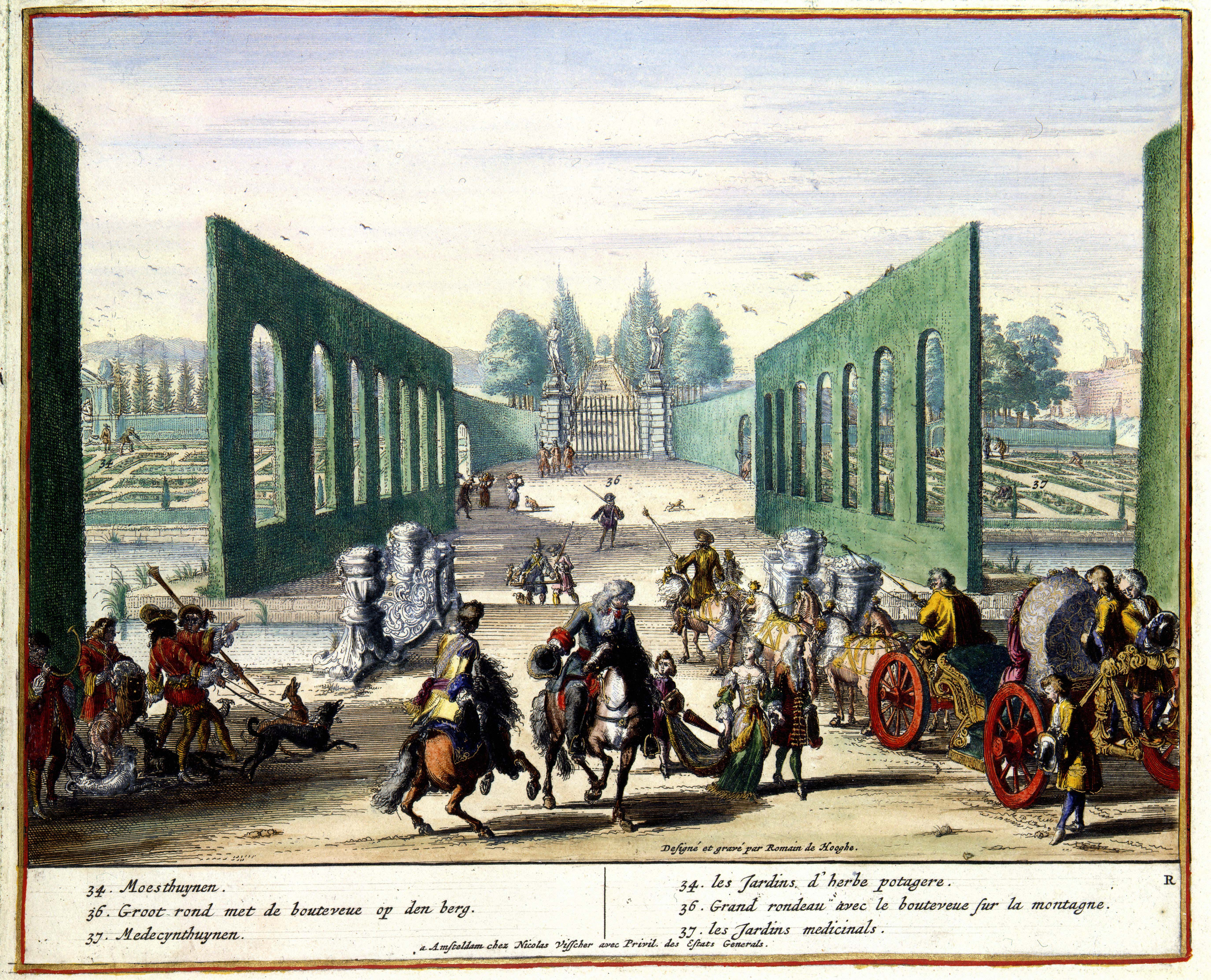
On the left the vegetable garden, on the right the medicine garden

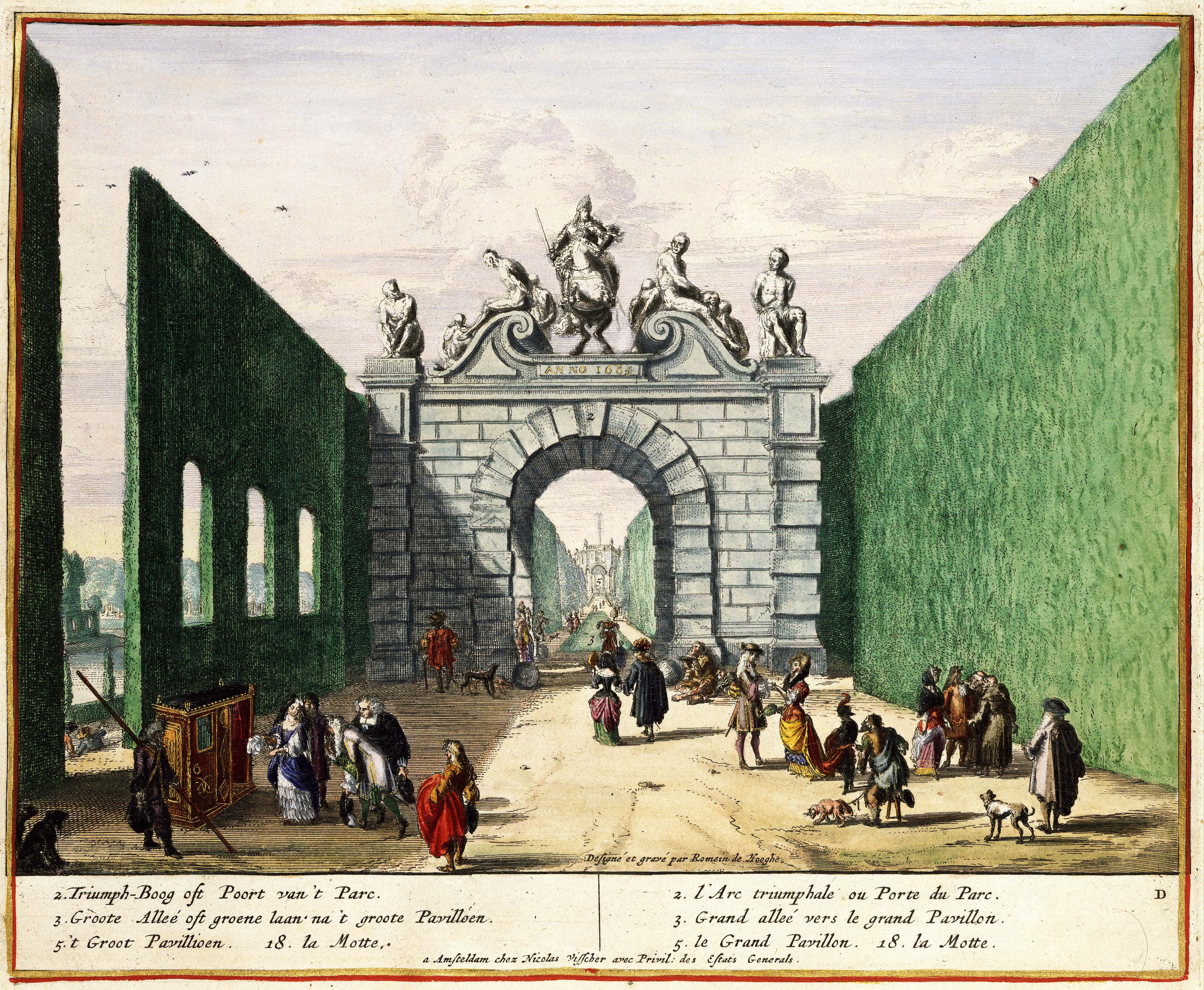
The so-called 'Slave Gate', a triumphal arch

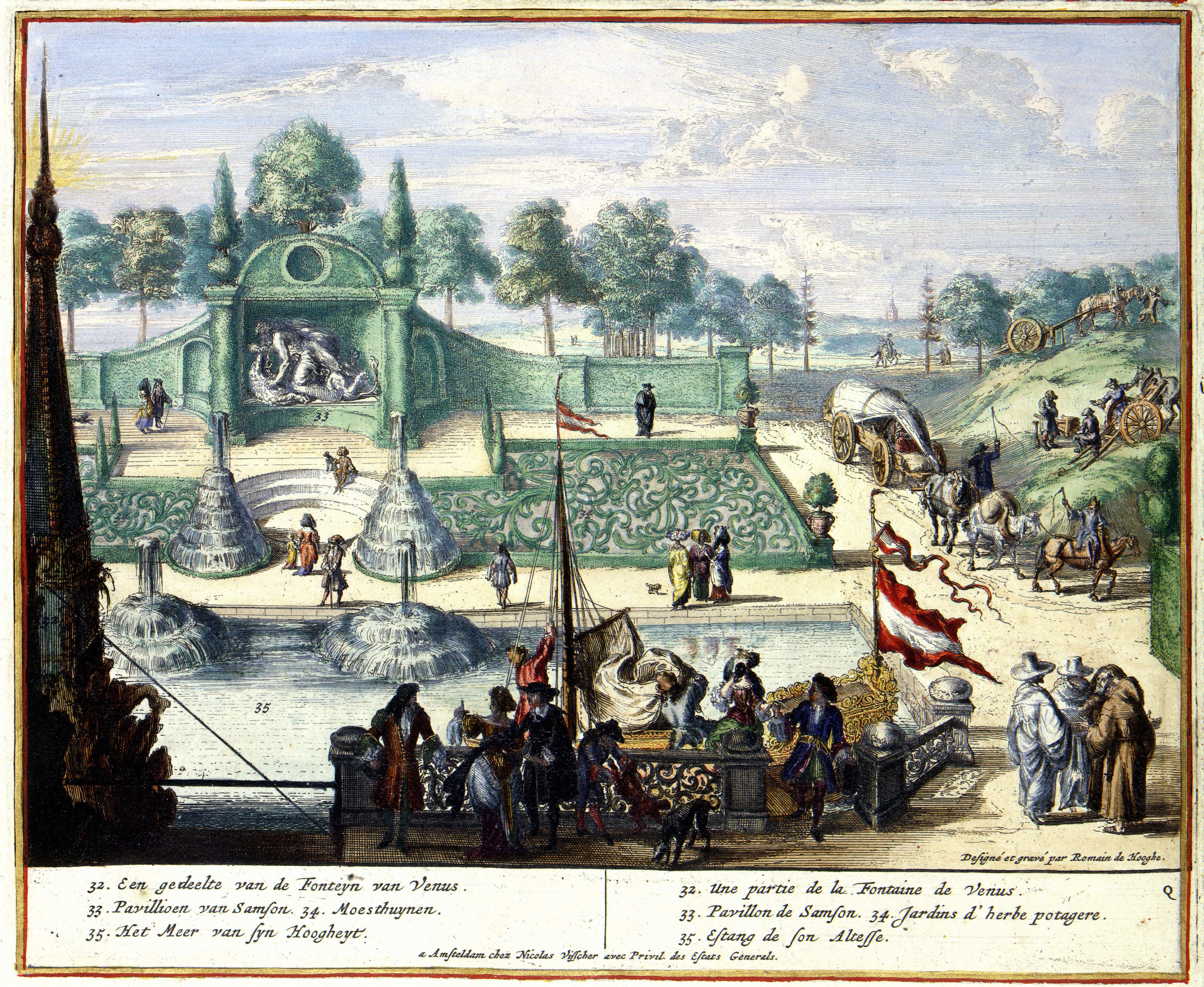
Venus fountain and pavilion dedicated to Samson

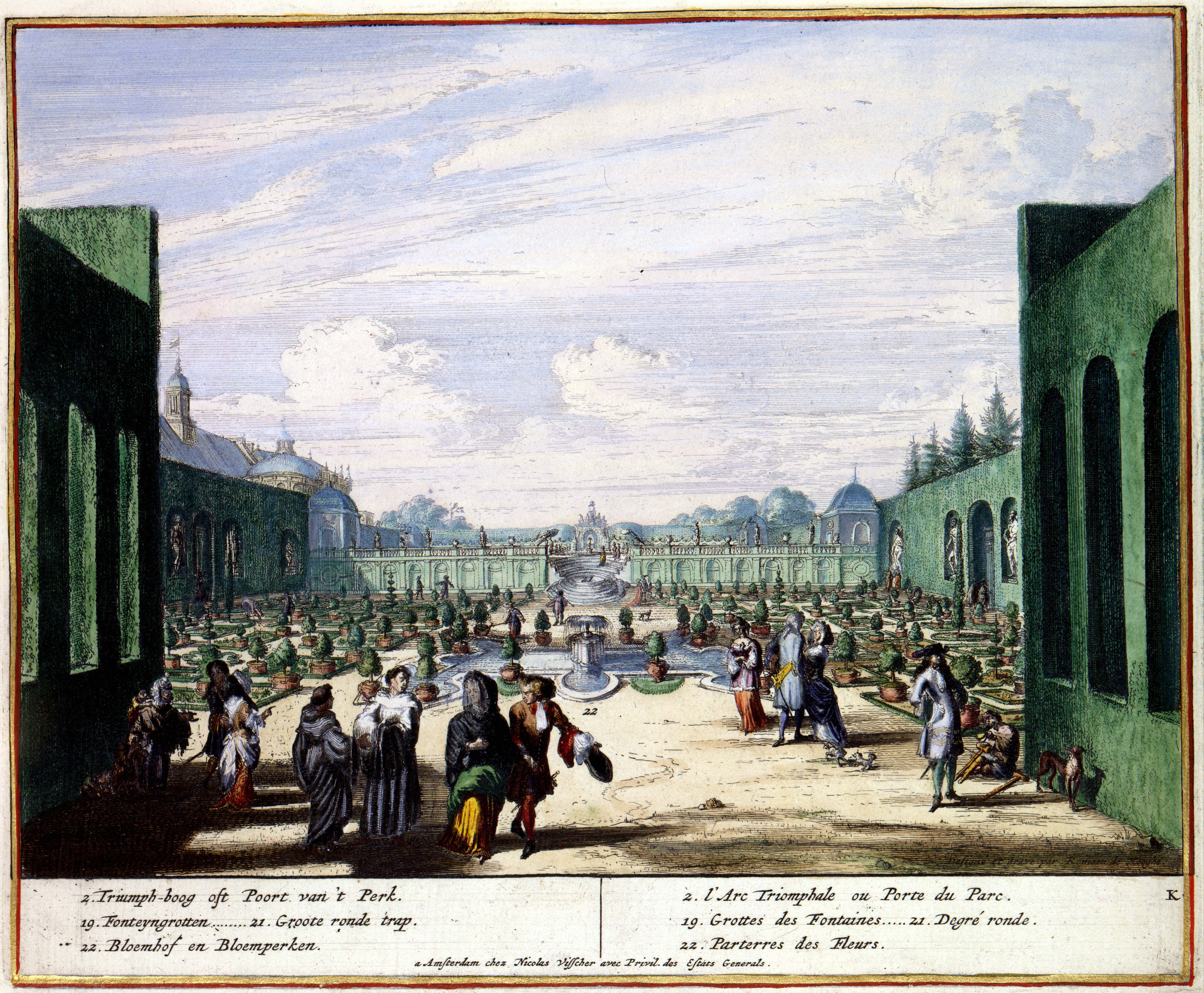
Flower garden with the round staircase and the Slave Gate behind it

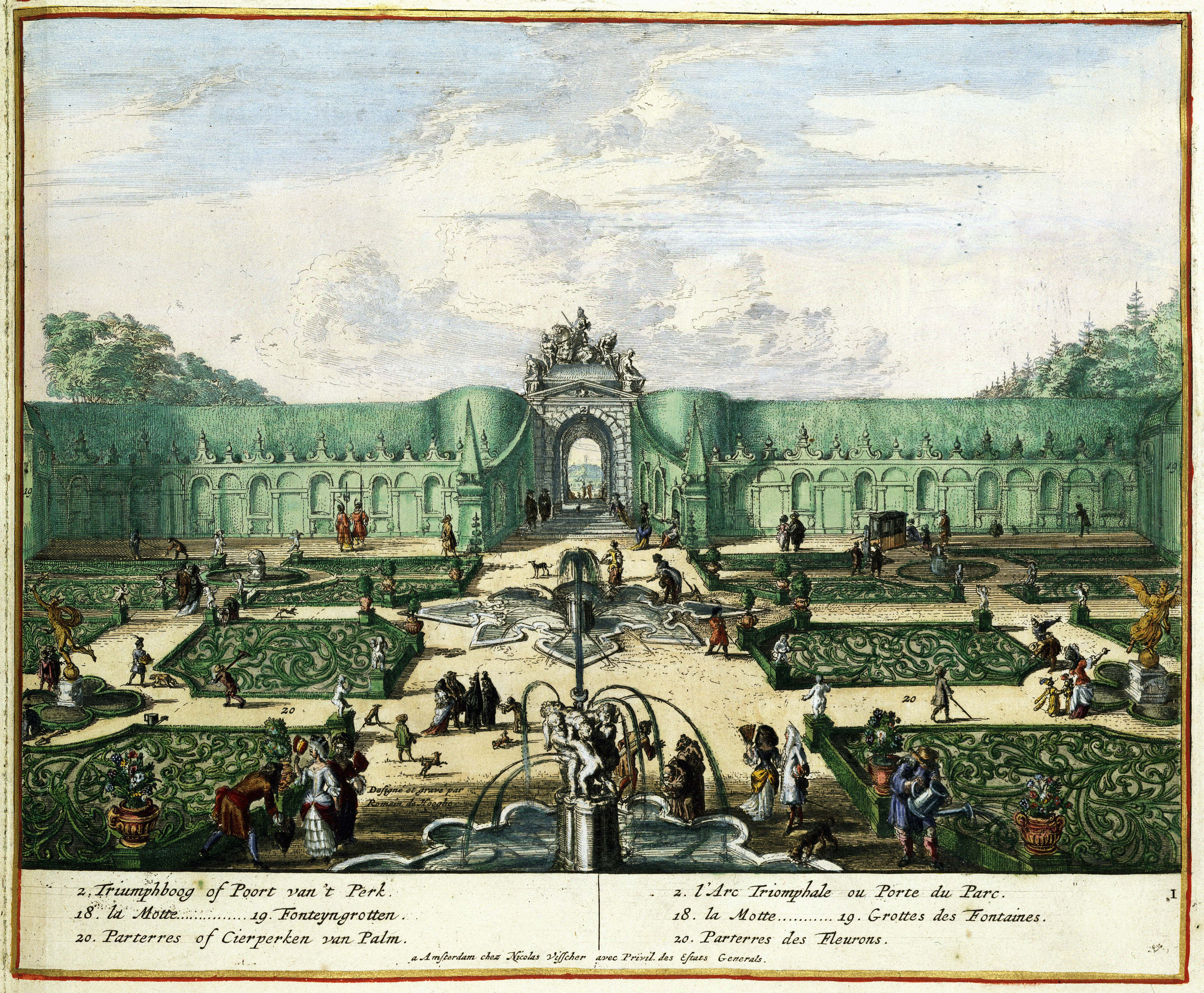
Fountain and side view of the Slave Gate

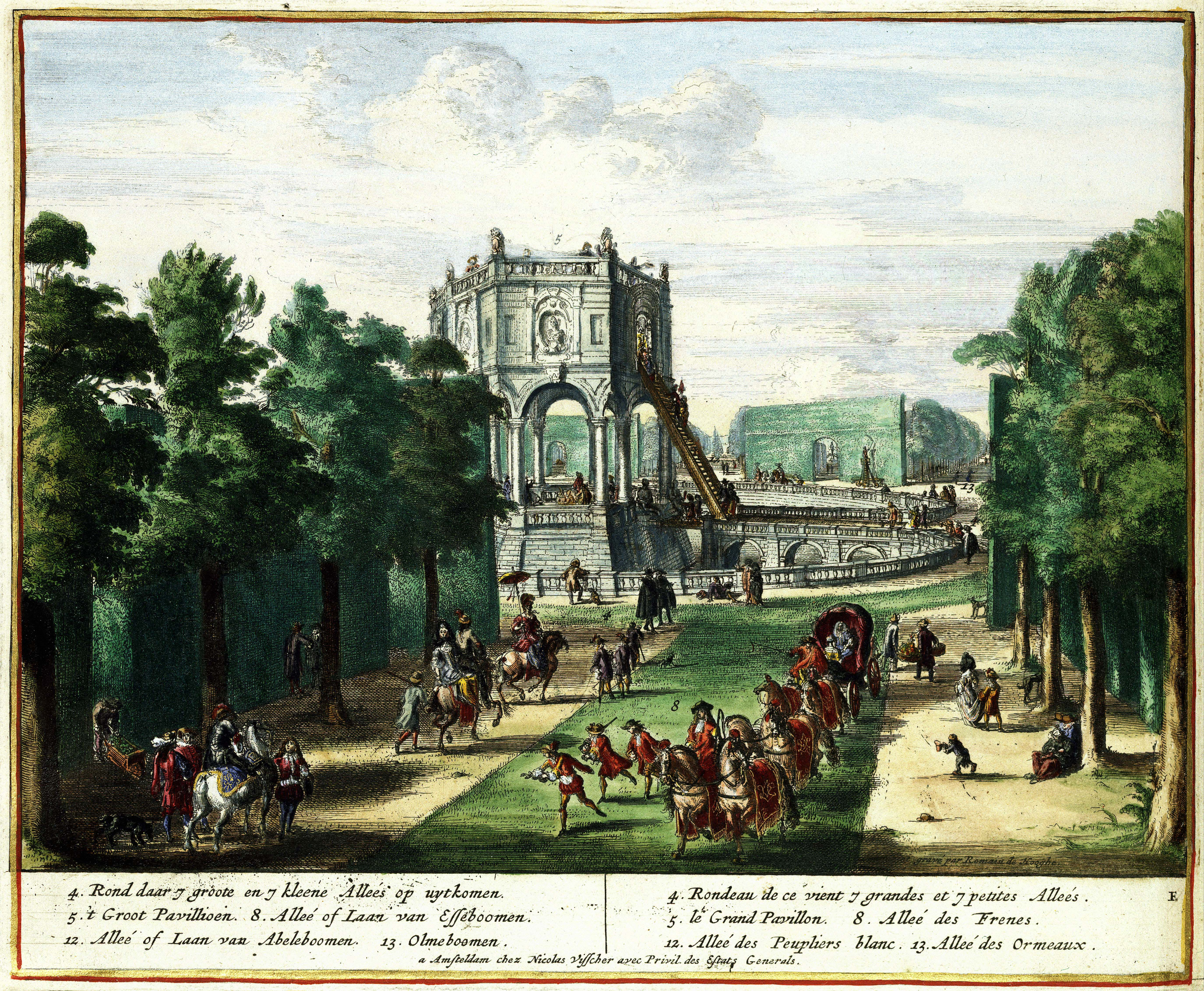
Large Pavilion with the stairs that can be hidden within the bridge

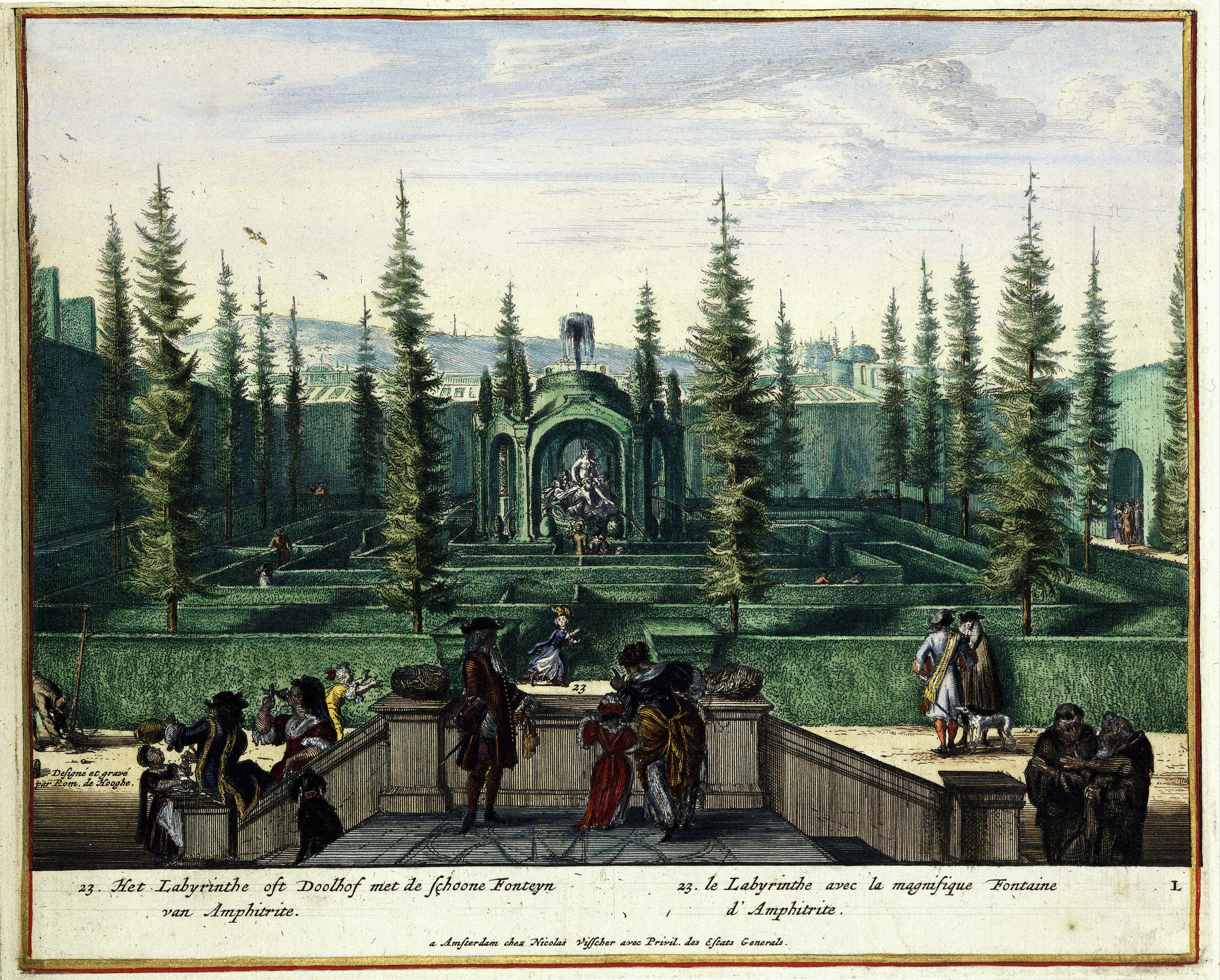
The Labyrinth with in the middle the fountain dedicated to Amphitrite

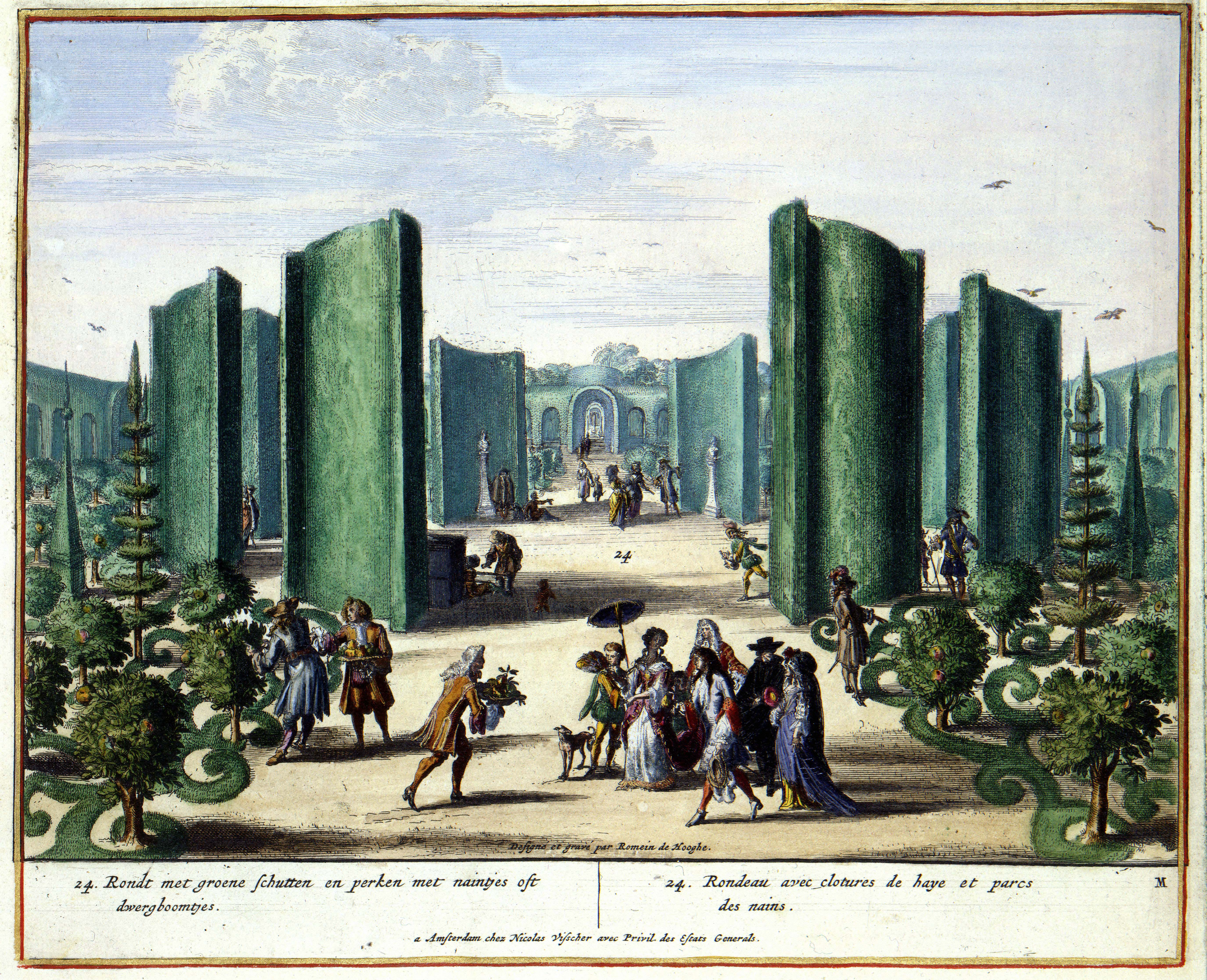
Hedge circle with orange trees

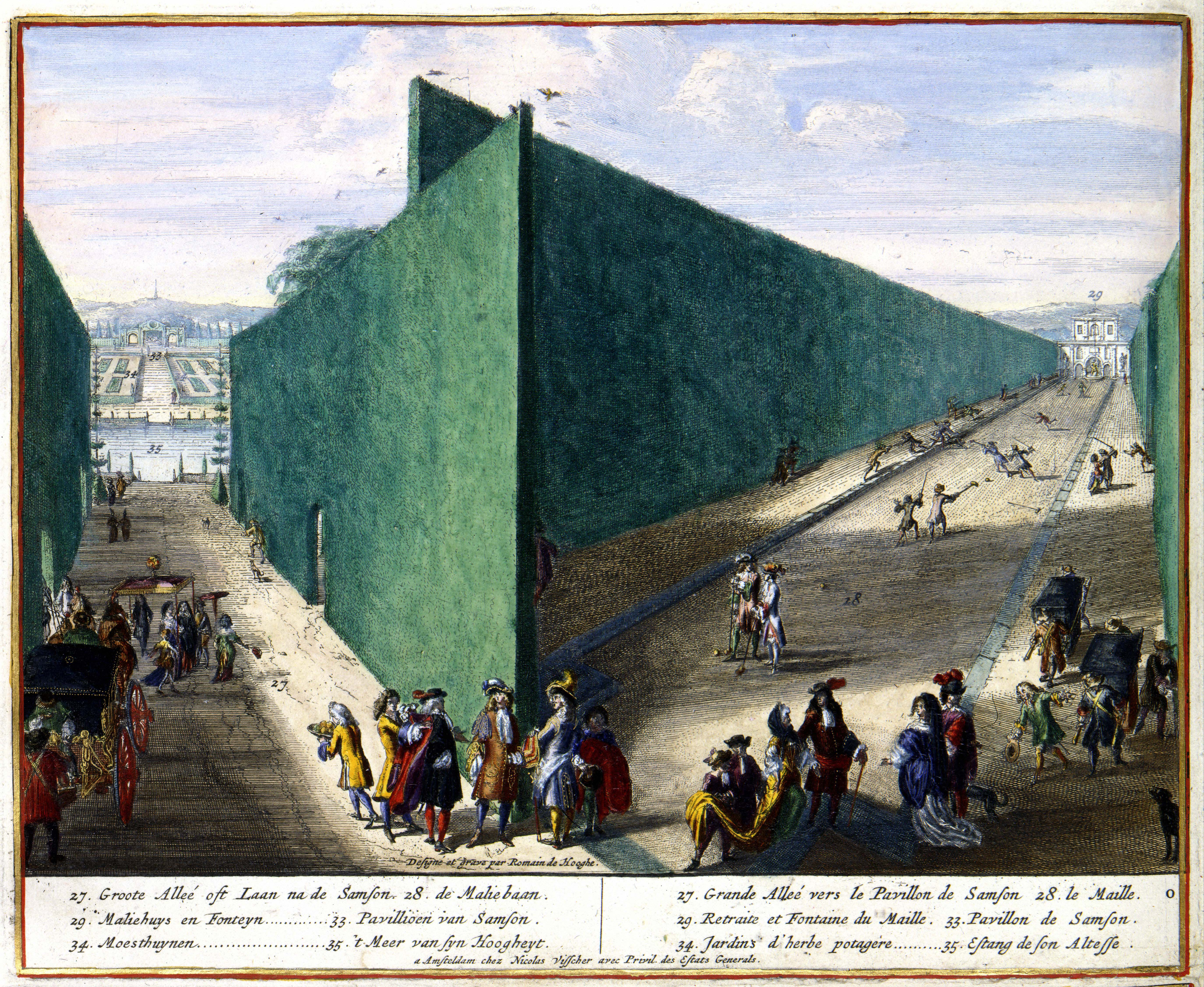
Crossroads with the pavilion dedicated to Samson on the left (beyond the lake), and the 'Maliehuis' on the right

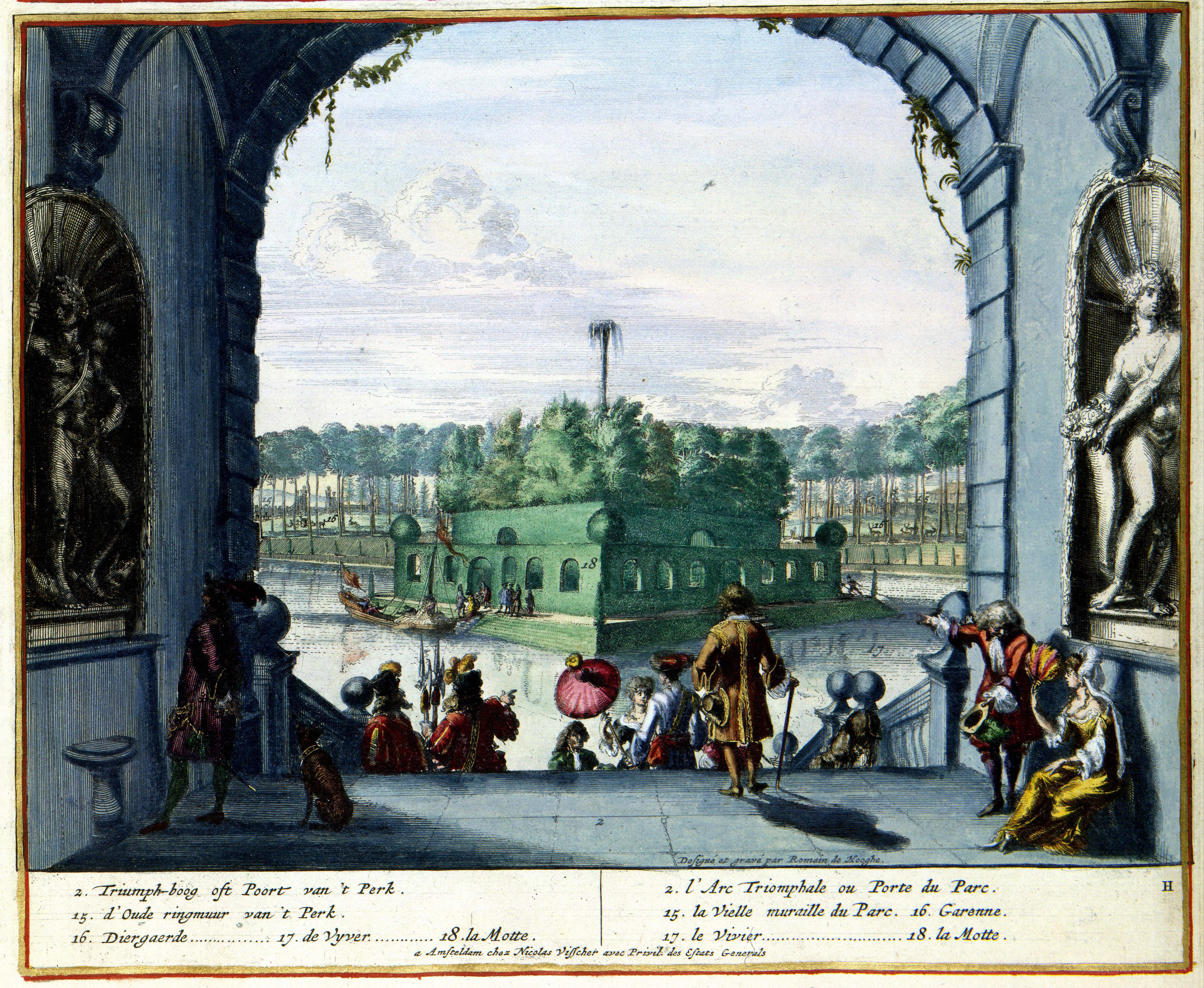
The planted Motte in the middle of the pond
