= Château d'Enghien (Belgium) =

Coordinates: 50.6895°N 4.0419°E

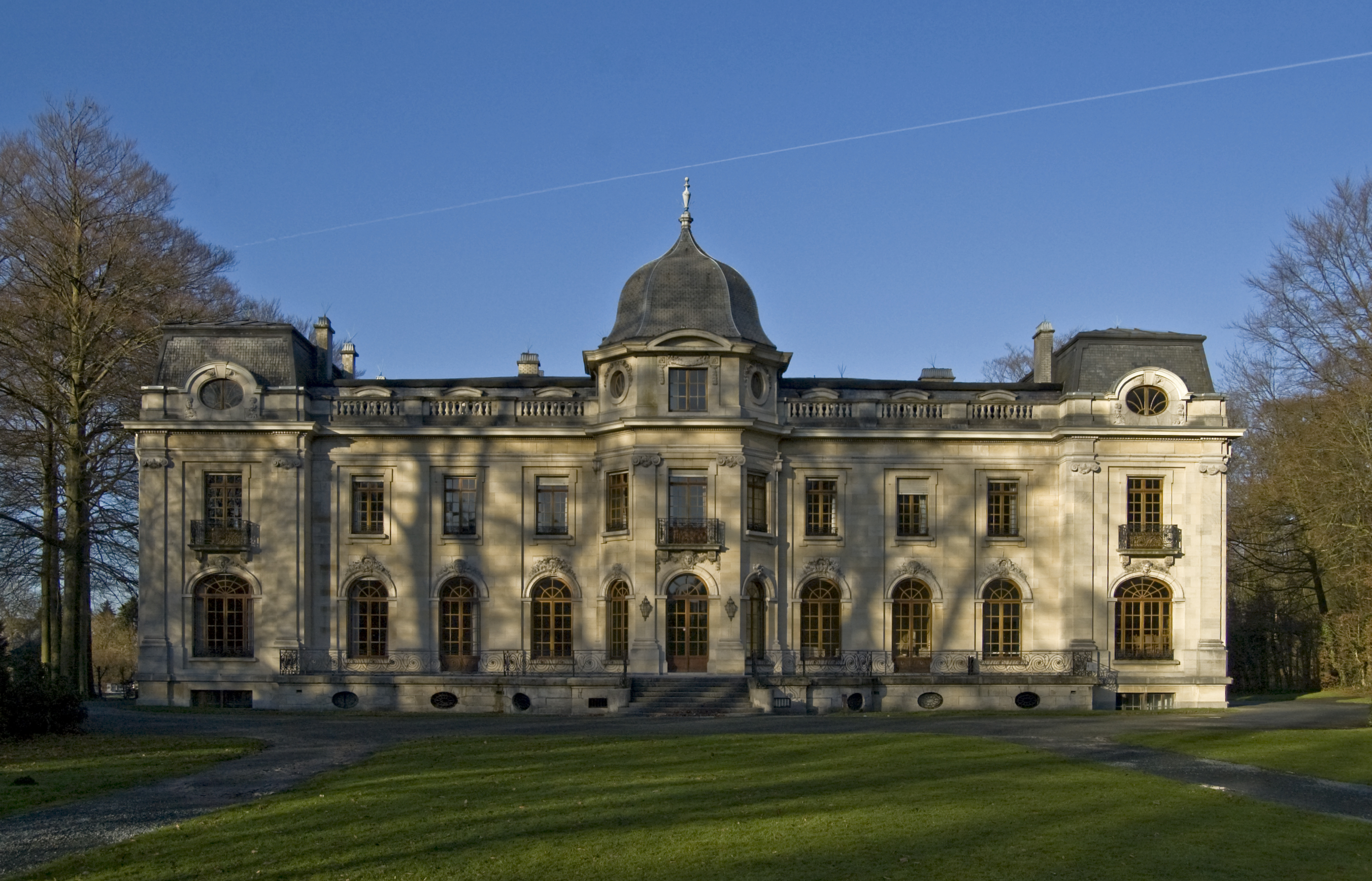
The current Château d'Enghien created by Baron Empain

Château d'Enghien is a château in Enghien, Wallonia, Belgium. The château dates from 1913 and is located within the Enghien Gardens.

Before that, there were two other structures in its place. One was razed due to disrepair. The Duke Louis-Engelbert built another building in its stead. It caught fire on his inauguration day. The current building was built in 1913 on the request of Baron François Empain.

== See also ==
- Baron Empain Palace (1911) in Cairo, Egypt
