= Enghien =

City in Hainaut Province, Wallonia, Belgium

Enghien: Inguî (Picard); Edingen (Dutch)
- Municipality
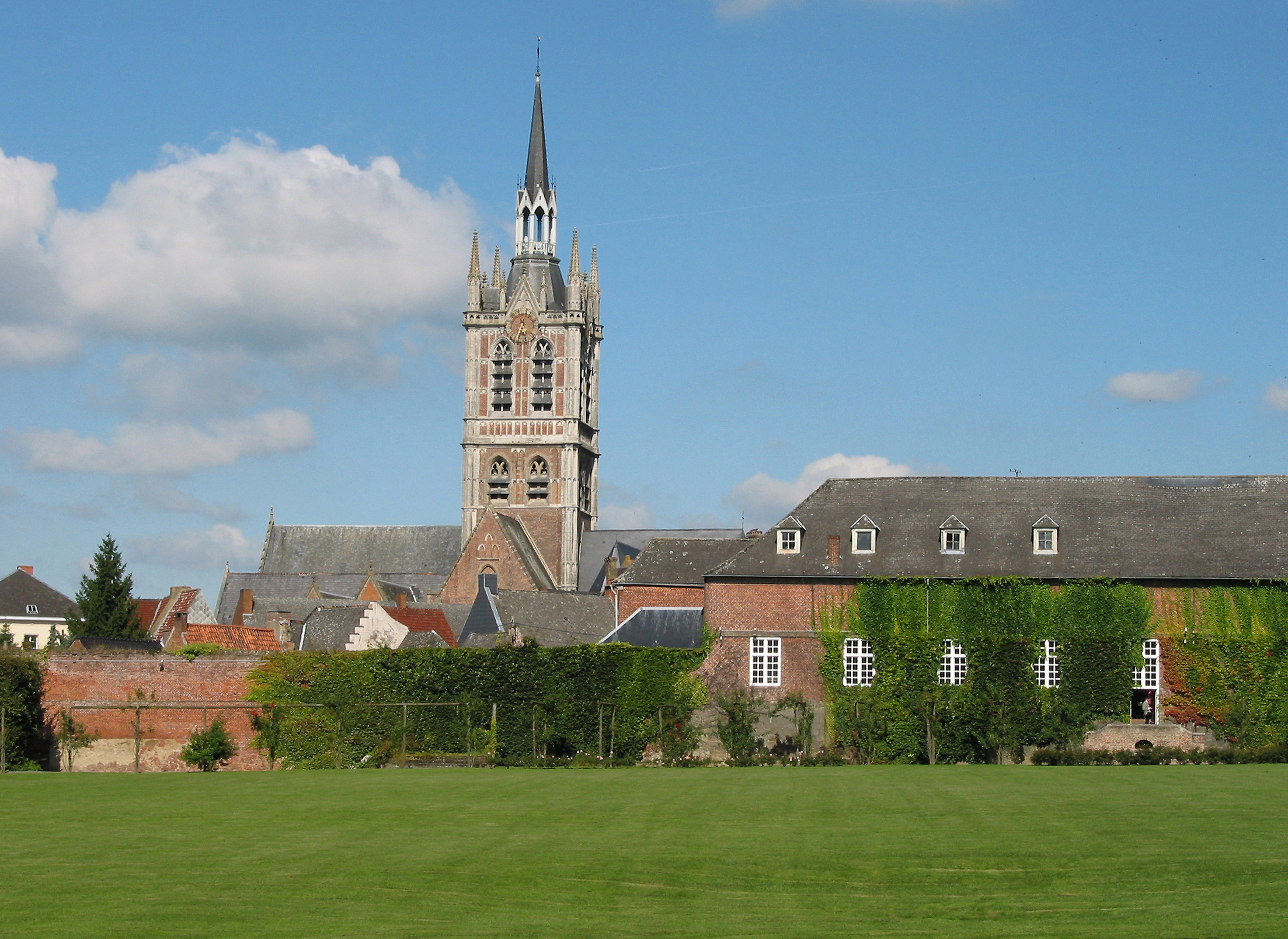

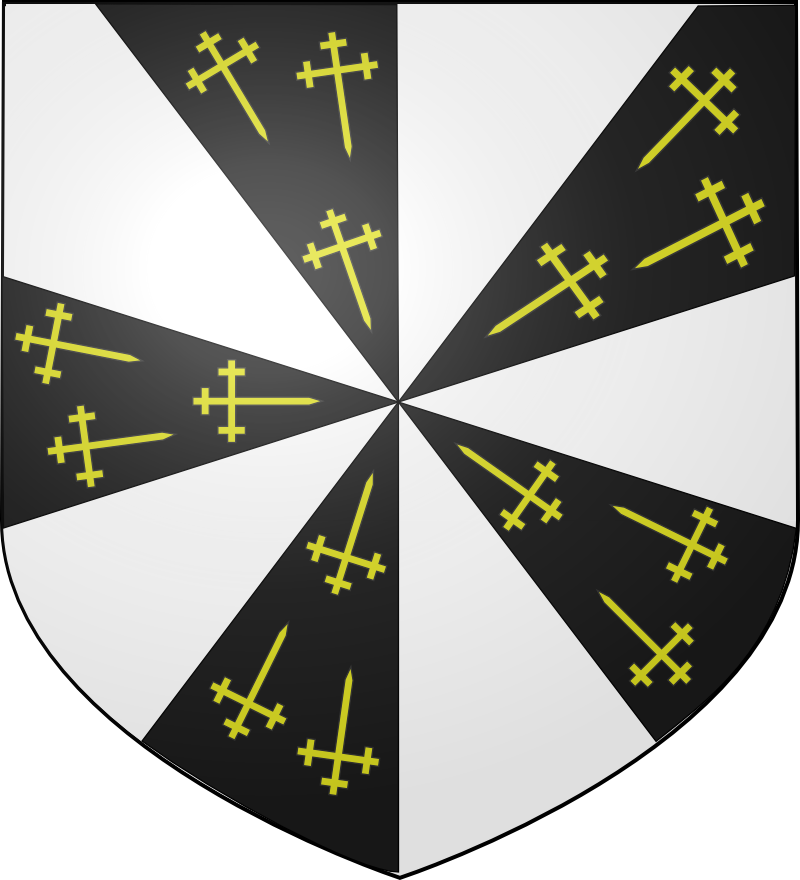
- Flag Coat of arms

- Location of Enghien in Hainaut
- Interactive map of Enghien
- Location in Belgium
- Coordinates: 50°41′44″N 04°02′28″E
- Country: Belgium
- Community: French Community
- Region: Wallonia
- Province: Hainaut
- Arrondissement: Ath

Government
  - Mayor: Marc Vanderstichelen (Les Engagés)
  - Governing party: Généractions (MR-Les Engagés) - En Mouvement

Area
  - Total: 39.4 km^{2} (15.2 sq mi)

Population (2018-01-01)
  - Total: 13,734
  - Density: 349/km^{2} (903/sq mi)
- Postal codes: 7850
- NIS code: 51067
- Area codes: 02
- Website: www.enghien-edingen.be

Enghien (French: [ɑ̃ɡjɛ̃]; Dutch: Edingen [ˈeːdɪŋə(n)]; Picard: Inguî; West Flemish: Enge) is a city and municipality of Wallonia located in the province of Hainaut, Belgium.

On 1 January 2006, Enghien had a total population of 11,980. The total area is 40.59 km^{2} (15.67 sq mi), which gives a population density of 295 inhabitants per km^{2}.

The municipality consists of the following districts: Enghien, Marcq, and Petit-Enghien. It is situated on the Flemish border, and restricted language rights are granted to the Dutch speaking minority (so-called language facilities).

== History ==
Enghien was founded by the House of Enghien, a famous noble family whose Italian branch included Mary of Enghien, Queen consort of Naples. Other famous members of this family was Mariette d'Enghien, mother of Jean d'Orléans, Count of Dunois, son of Louis I, Duke of Orléans (cadet son of King Charles V of France) and founder of the House of Orléans-Longueville.

Enghien gave its name to a French duchy and to the commune of Enghien-les-Bains, a suburb of Paris, due to a complex series of family successions: in 1487, Mary of Luxembourg (d. 1547), the only heir of Peter II of Luxembourg (d. 1482), Count of Saint-Pol-sur-Ternoise and member of one of the branches of the House of Luxembourg, married François de Bourbon-Vendôme (d. 1495), the great-grandfather of King Henry IV of France. Mary of Luxembourg brought as her dowry the fief of Condé-en-Brie (Aisne département, France) and the county of Enghien, among others. These fiefs passed to her grandson Louis I de Bourbon, Prince de Condé, uncle of King Henry IV of France, who started the line of the Princes of Condé, the famous cadet branch of the French royal family.

The town of Enghien was sold by the House of Bourbon to the House of Arenberg in 1606. The Dukes of Arenberg created the famous Enghien Gardens around the castle that became the seat of their Court.

== Duchy ==
In 1566, the county of Enghien was elevated to a duchy-peerage. However, the necessary registration process was not completed, so the title became extinct at the death of Louis I de Bourbon in 1569. In 1633, Henry II, Prince of Condé, grandson of Louis I de Bourbon, inherited the duchy of Montmorency, near Paris, after the execution of Henri II de Montmorency, brother of his wife Charlotte-Marguerite de Montmorency. In 1689, King Louis XIV allowed Henry III, Prince of Condé, grandson of Henry II, Prince of Condé, to rename the duchy of Montmorency as "duchy of Enghien", in memory of the duchy of Enghien which the Princes of Condé had lost in 1569 at the death of Louis I de Bourbon. The "new" ducal title could not be anymore related to Enghien because the lordship was sold in 1606 (and anyway the town was outside France) and so the Princes created a new Enghien as territorial designation.

The city of Montmorency, at the heart of the duchy, continued to be known as "Montmorency", despite the official name change, but the name "Enghien" stuck to the nearby lake and marshland that developed later as a spa resort and was incorporated as the commune of Enghien-les-Bains in the 19th century.

== Image gallery ==
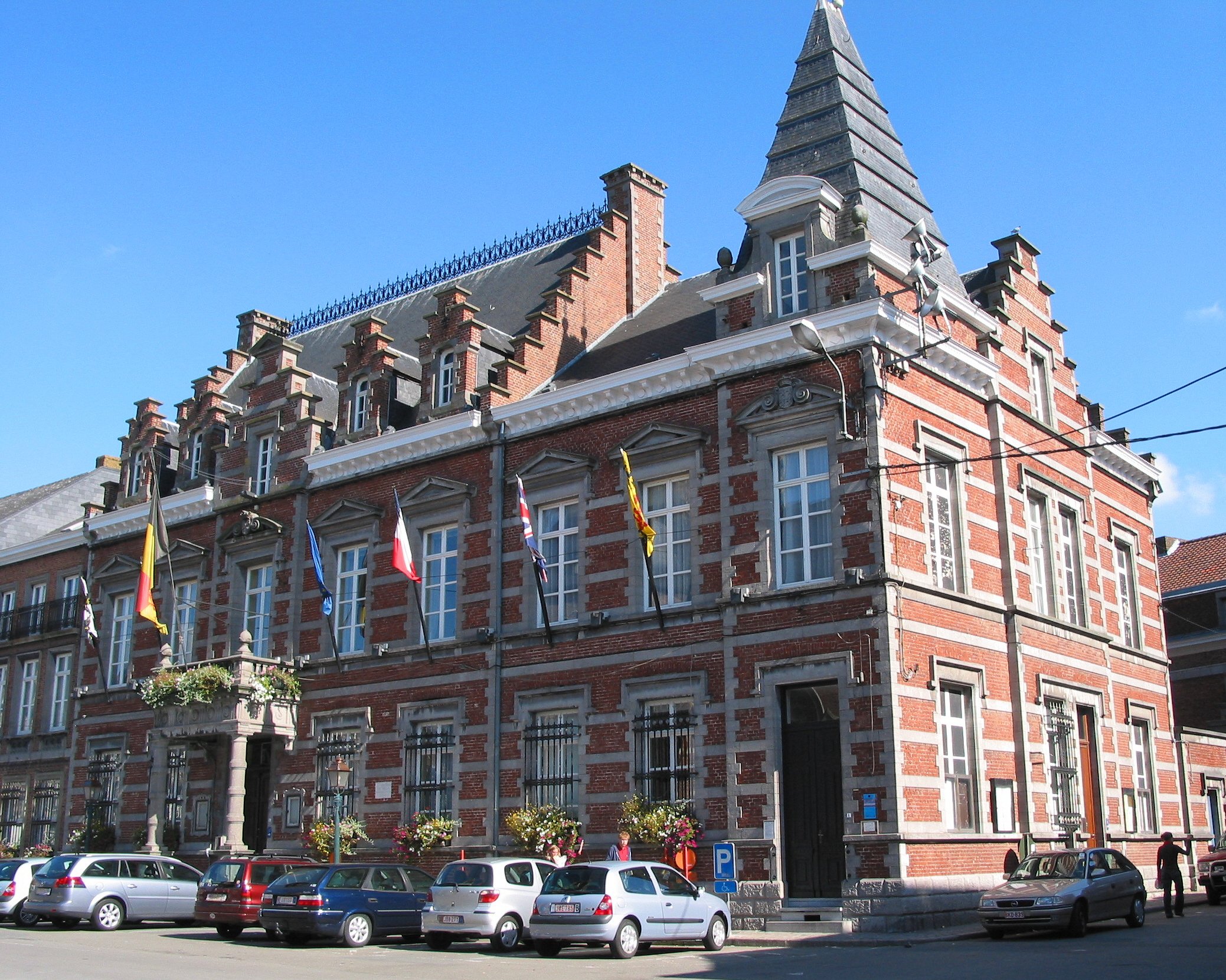
Town hall

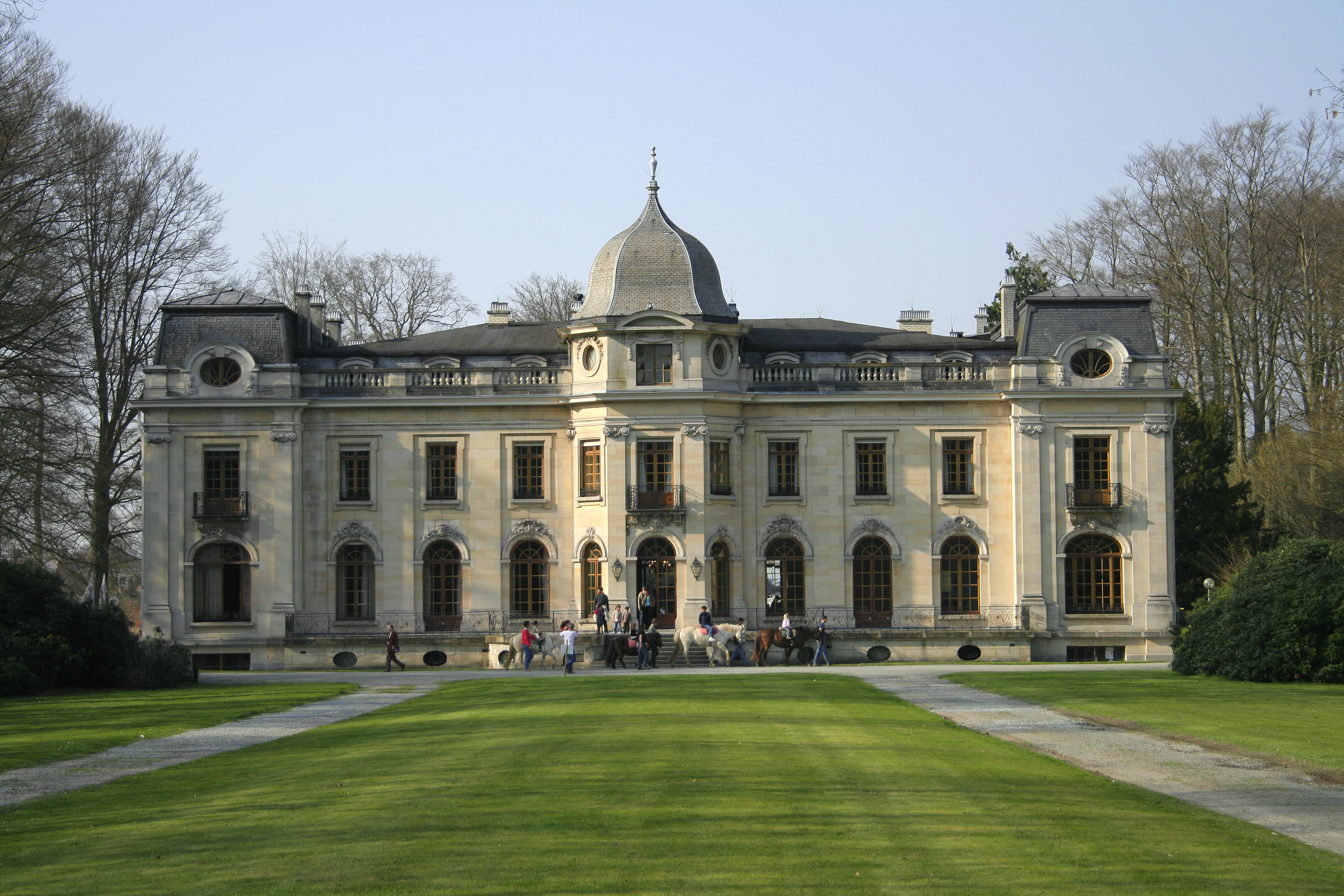
The Empain château in the Enghien Gardens

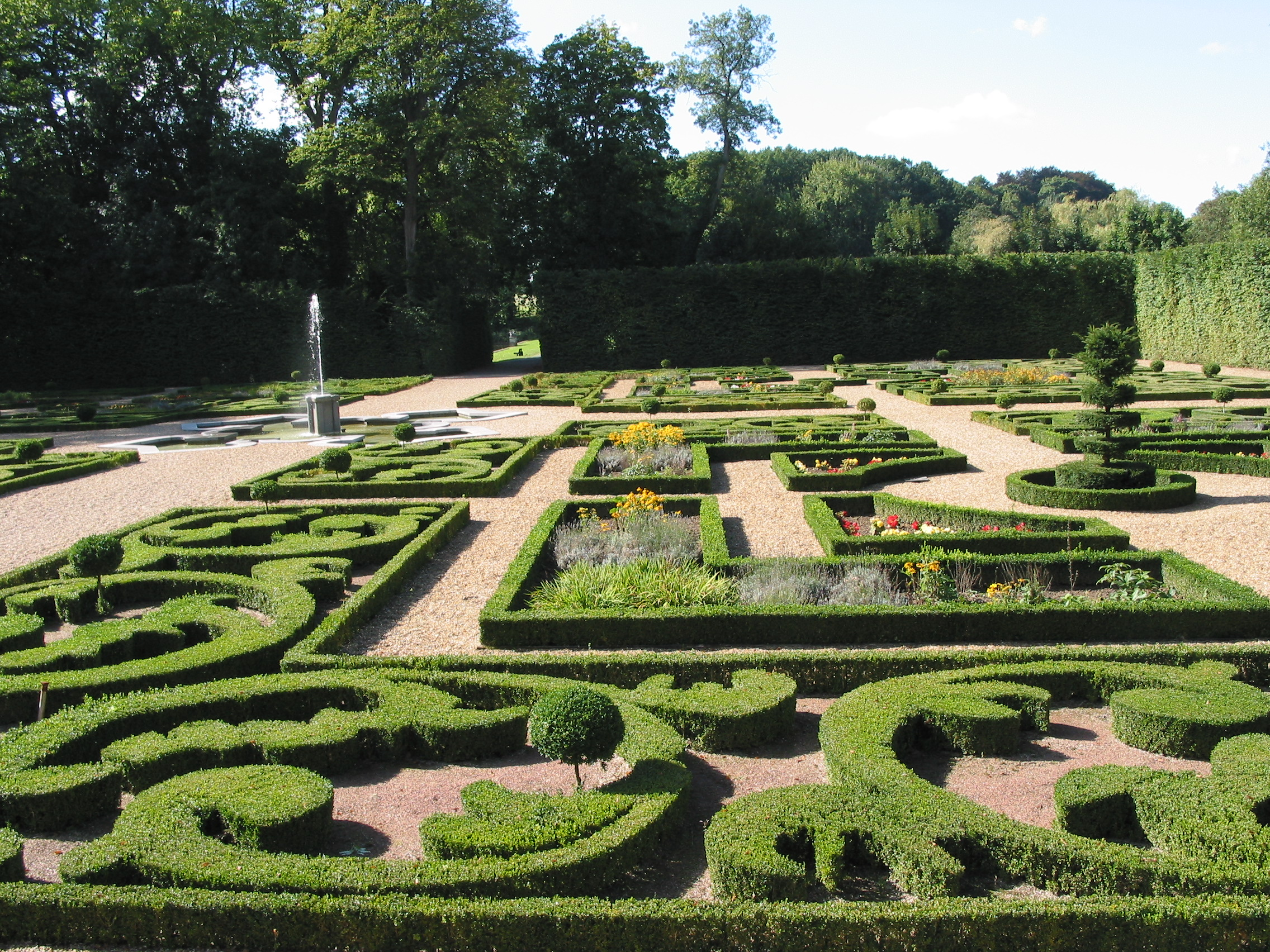
Enghien Gardens

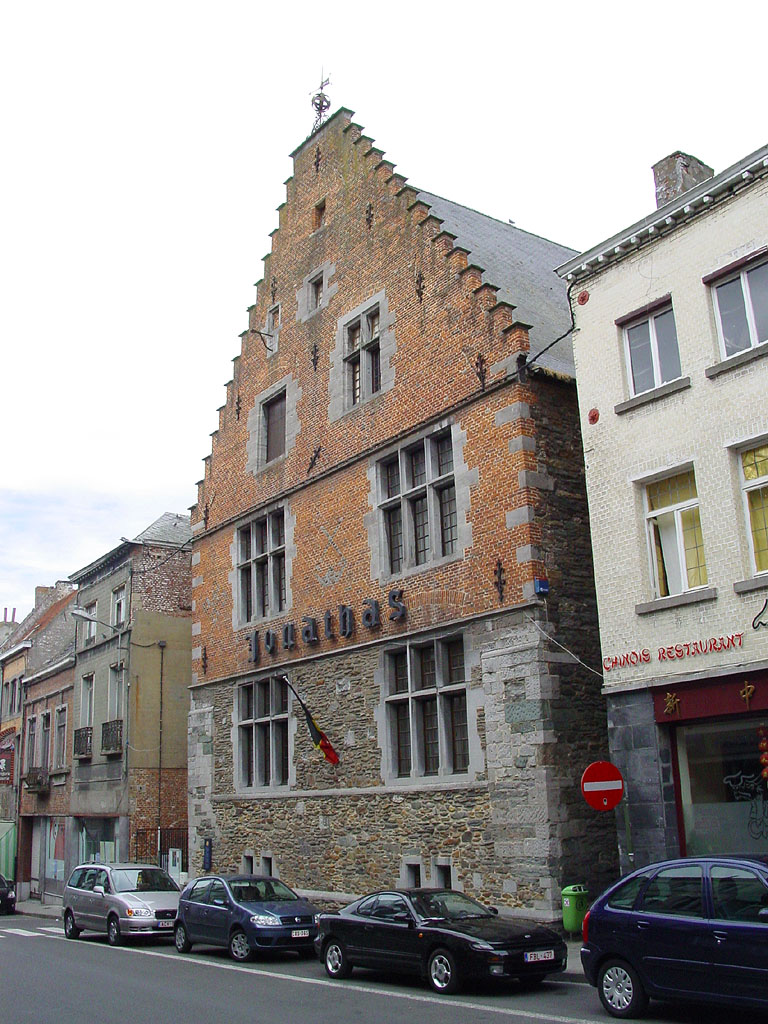
Jonathas House (16th century)

Enghien depicted in a manuscript of Jean d'Enghien's chronicle from the 1470s

== See also ==
- Qualitis Science Park
