= Comte de La Marck =

Comte de La Marck or Count de La Marck (Count of the Mark) can refer to

- Rules of County of Mark#Mark from 1198 until 1398
- Auguste Marie Raymond, Prince d'Arenberg, Comte de la Marck (1753–1833), Belgian soldier, and interlocutor between Marie-Antoinette and Count de Mirabeau.

See also

comté de La Marck (County of Mark), a county of the Holy Roman Empire in the Lower Rhenish-Westphalian Circle. It lay on both sides of the Ruhr River along the Volme and Lenne Rivers.
