= Jean Charles Joseph, Count of Merode, Marquis of Deynze =

His Grace Jean-Charles, Count of Merode, Marquess of Deynze
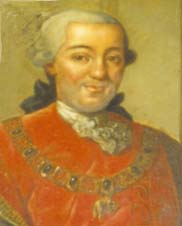

Marquess of Deynze
- Preceded by: Joachim Maximilien of Mérode

Personal details
- Spouse(s): Marie Flore Charlotte Thérèse, princess of Arenberg

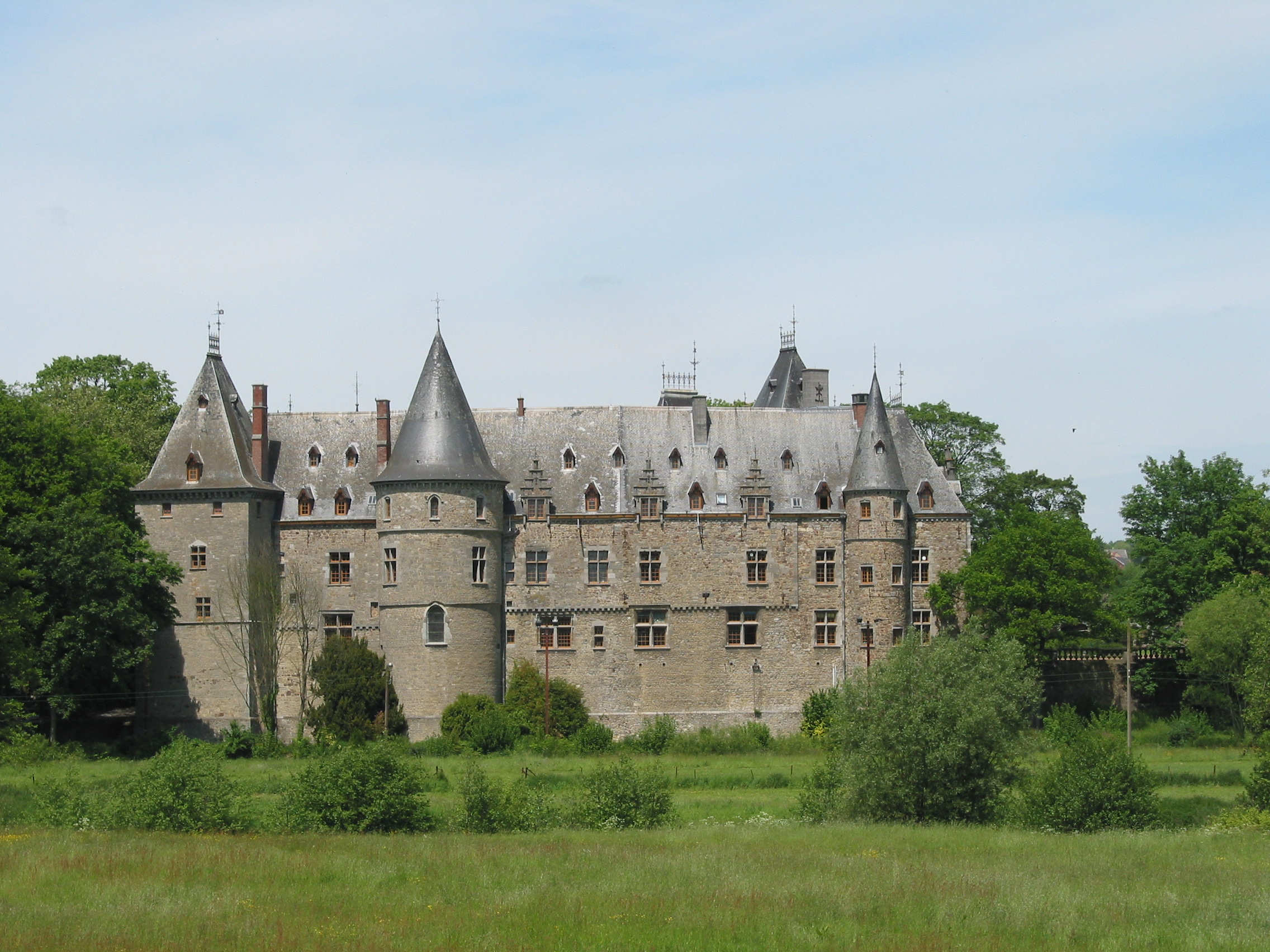
Ham-sur-Heure Castle, the birth and death place of the Marquess of Deynze

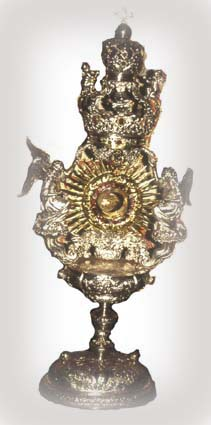
Mérode Monstrance, Saint Martin Church Treasure, Ham-sur-Heure

Jean Charles Joseph, Count of Merode, Marquess of Deynze was a noble of the Austrian Netherlands, born in the Prince-Bishopric of Liège. He was Lieutenant-Feldmarschall of the Holy Roman Empire, Knight of the Order of the Golden Fleece.

== Biography ==
He was born into House of Merode, in the castle of Ham-sur-Heure, Prince-Bishopric of Liège on 3 December 1719. He was the second and eldest surviving son of Joachim Maximilien of Mérode, Marquess of Deynze by his first wife and 2nd cousin, Thérèse-Jeanne, countess of Mérode-Nalinnes.

His elder brother, Maximilien Louis being dead in 1728 and his father having left no will when he died in 1740, he inherited his whole succession, as the surviving eldest son.

He married, on 12 January 1744 in Heverlee's Arenberg Castle, Marie Flore Charlotte Thérèse, princess of Arenberg, 3rd daughter of Léopold Philippe d'Arenberg, 4th Duke of Arenberg, Dame of the Order of the Starry Cross but had no descent.

He was appointed Colonel (Commander-in-Chief) of the Regiment of Los Rios (1745–1751), General-major (1751), Lieutenant-Feldmarschall of the Holy Roman Empire.

He was Grand Bailiff of the Quarter of Entre-Sambre-et-Meuse of the Prince-Bishopric of Liège.

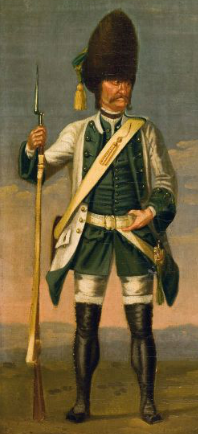
Grenadier of Los Rios Regiment, 1748

His Regiment of Los Rios participated in the Battle of Rocourt and covered the retreat of the Dutch infantry. It participated in the Battle of Lauffeld. With the same Regiment, he defended the city of Maastricht, during the Siege of Maastricht (1748), led by the Maréchal of France Maurice de Saxe. It caused heavy losses to the French army during the heroic night of 1–2 May 1748.

He was also a co-director and financial supporter (1750–1752) of the Théatre de la Monnaie in Brussels, together with his father-in-law and the Duke of Ursel. See List of directors of the Théâtre de la Monnaie

His half-brother Balthazar-Philippe of Mérode, Lord of Rixensart inherited his lordships when he died in Ham-sur-Heure Castle on 10 August 1774.

== Honours ==
- Holy Roman Empire : 785th Knight of the Order of the Golden Fleece (Austrian Branch)
  (appointed in 1765, by Joseph II, Holy Roman Emperor)
  The jewel of his Golden Fleece is inserted into the Grand Ostensoir (Monstrance) of Saint Martin Church in Ham-sur-Heure.
- Holy Roman Empire (Austrian Netherlands) : Chamberlain of TT.II.& RR. Majesties.

== Titles ==
- Marquess of Deynze
- Count of Mérode, of Montfort
- Viscount of Wavremont
- Baron of Duffel
- Lord of Crupet, Ham-sur-Heure, Nalinnes, Groesbeek, Morialmé, Sautour, Solre-sur-Sambre
- Hereditary Haut-Avoué of Fosses-la-Ville.

== Ancestors ==
His ancestry shows a high level of members of his own House of Mérode

Ancestors of Jean Charles Joseph, Count of Merode, Marquis of Deynze

16. Maximilen-Antoine, count of Mérode-Montfort
8. Ferdinand de Merode, count of Mérode-Deynze
17. Anne Françoise de Carondelet, viscountess of Wavremont
4. Maximilen-Albert, count of Mérode-Deynze
18. Count Charles Albert de Longueval-Buquoy
9. Marie Célestine de Longueval
19. Countess Marie Wilhelmine de Croÿ-le-Château
2. Joachim Maximilien, count of Mérode-Deynze
20. Philipp Magnus von Salm-Neuweiler
10. Charles Florentin, w.& rheingraf von Salm-Neuweiler
21. Marguerite Thesart
5. Klara Eleonore von Salm-Neuweiler
22. Count Albert-Francois de Lalaing-Hoogstraeten
11. Marie Gabrielle de Lalaing, countess of Hoogstraten
23. Elisabetha, countess of Arenberg
1. Jean Charles Joseph of Mérode-Deynze
24. Maximilen-Antoine, count of Mérode-Montfort
12. Jean, count of Mérode-Nalinnes
25. Anne Françoise de Carondelet, viscountess of Wavreumont
6. Maximilien François, count of Mérode-Nalinnes
26. Count Rasse de Gavre-Aiseau
13. Philippine, countess of Gavre, Dame of Lisseroeul
27. Marie Jeanne de Licques
3. Thérèse-Jeanne, countess of Mérode-Nalinnes
28. Baron Johann de Merode
14. Ferdinand Maximilian, count of Mérode-Groesbeek
29. Maximilienne, Heiress of Groesbeek
7. Catherine Thérèse, countess of Mérode-Groesbeek
30. Floris de Mérode, Marquis of Westerloo
15. Bona Albertine of Mérode-Westerloo
31. Anna Maria, Gräfin von Bronckhorst-Batenburg
