= Charles Marie Raymond, 5th Duke of Arenberg =

Austrian field marshal

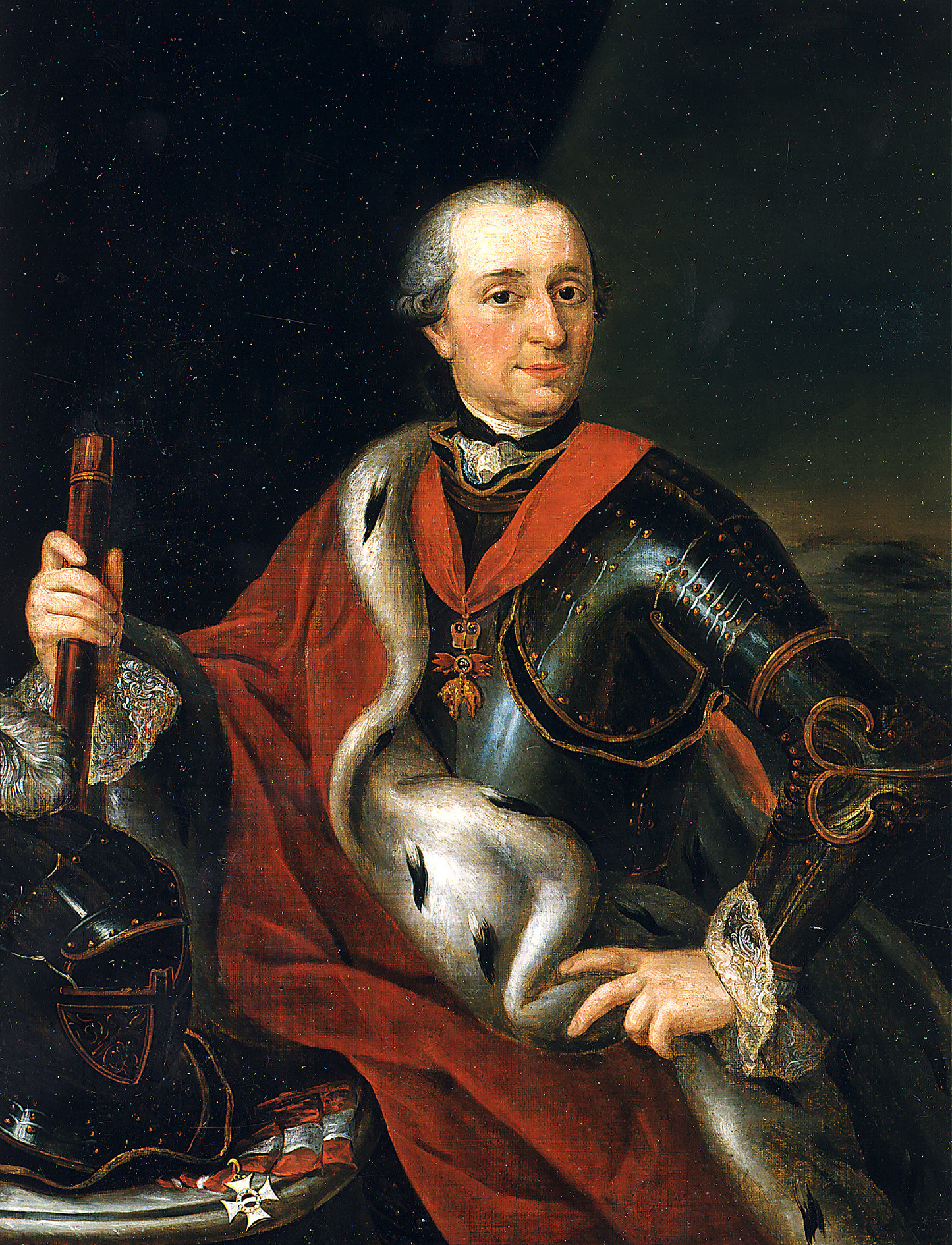

Charles Marie Raymond d'Arenberg (Enghien, 1 April 1721 – Enghien, 17 August 1778) was the fifth Duke of Arenberg, 11th Duke of Aarschot and an Austrian field marshal.

== Biography ==
Charles Marie was the eldest son of Duke Leopold Philippe of Arenberg and Duchess Maria Francesca Pignatelli-Bisaccia (1696–1766). His sister was Marie Victoire d'Arenberg, wife of Augustus George, Margrave of Baden-Baden.

Charles Marie joined his father's 1743 campaign in the War of Austrian Succession, first as lieutenant-colonel and later as colonel of the second Walloon Infantry Regiment, which he had raised personally. He commanded this regiment in the 1744 and 1745 campaigns, until he became colonel of the Baden-Baden Regiment. One year later he became major general. In 1748, he played an important role in the defence of Maastricht against the French.

Charles Marie also became Grand-Bailli of Hainaut and Mons in 1740.

In the first years of the Seven Years' War, he was active in the Bohemian theater of war. He participated in the Battle of Prague (1757) and the many battles that followed.

In 1758, he was promoted to Feldzeugmeister. On 14 October of that year, he played a crucial role in the victorious Battle of Hochkirch as commander of the right wing of the Austrian Army. For this, he was awarded the Grand Cross of the Military Order of Maria Theresa. In the 1759 campaign, he commanded several Army Corps and was defeated near Dresden on 29 October by Prussian troops under General Wunsch. He was praised for his actions in the lost Battle of Torgau on 3 November 1760, in which he was severely wounded.

These wounds meant the end of his active career, and he retired. In 1776, he was admitted to the Geheimrat, and he was made Field Marshal in 1777.

== Family ==
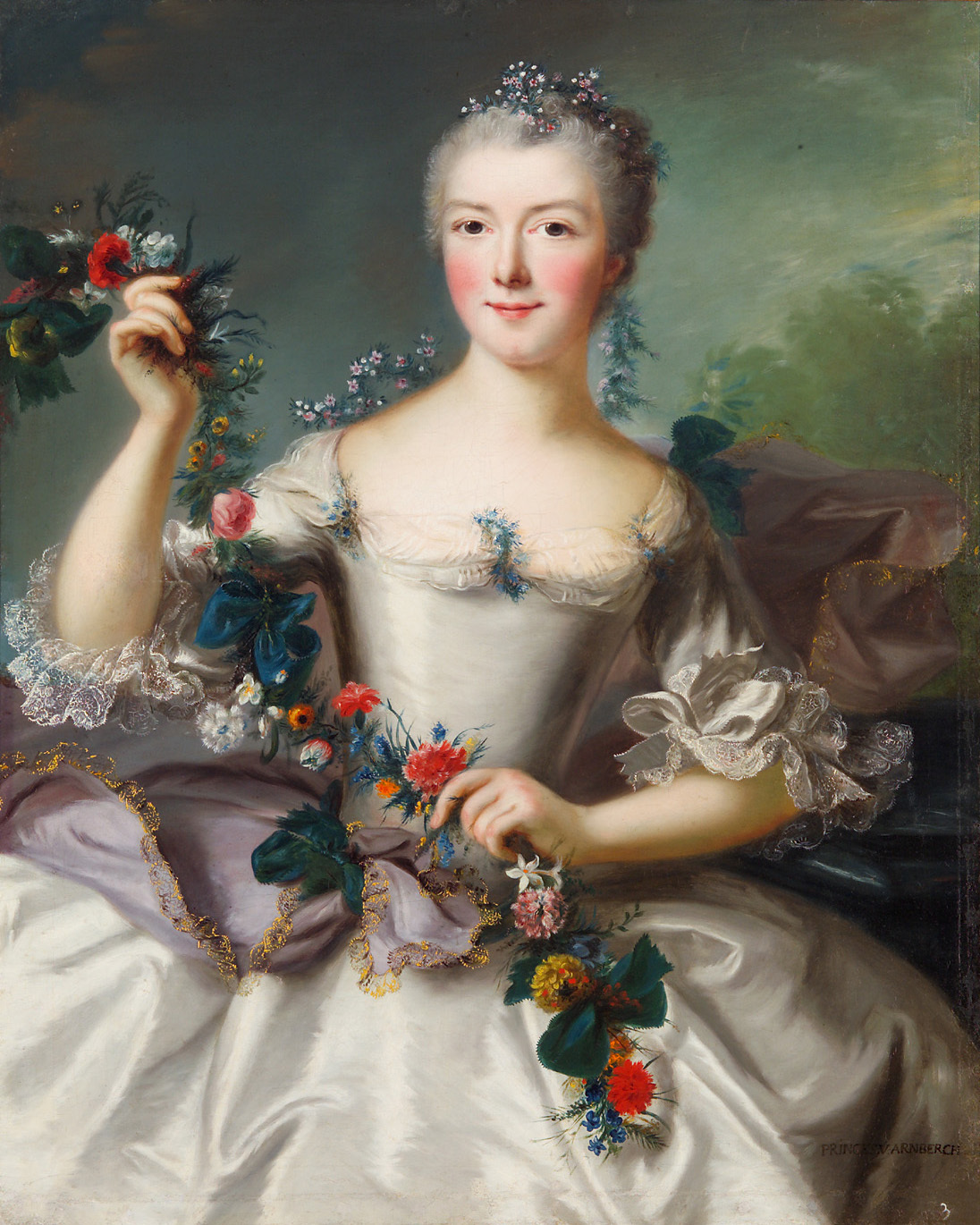
His wife, Louise Margarete de la Marck-Schleiden, countess of Vardes by Jean-Marc Nattier

He married Countess Louise Margarethe von der Marck-Schleiden (1730–1820), daughter of Count Louis Engelbert von der Marck-Schleiden in 1748.

They had eight children, amongst whom:

- Louis Engelbert, 6th Duke of Arenberg (1750–1820), married Louise Antoinette de Brancas-Villars, Countess of Lauragais (1755–1812),
- Leopoldine d'Arenberg (1751–1812), married Joseph, Count zu Windisch-Graetz (1744–1802)
- Marie-Flore (1752–1832), married Wolfgang, 3rd Duke of Ursel (1750–1804)
- Auguste Marie Raymond (1753–1833), married Marie-Françoise Le Danois (1757–1810),
- Marie Louise Françoise (1754–1838), married Ludwig, Prince of Starhemberg (1762–1833).
- Charles Joseph (1755–1775)
- Louis Marie Eugène (1757–1795), married Anne de Mailly-Nesle (1766–1789)

His sister, Princess Marie-Flore d'Arenberg, was the wife of Count Jean Charles de Merode-Deynze.
