= List of protected heritage sites in Ham-sur-Heure-Nalinnes =

This table shows an overview of the protected heritage sites in the Walloon town Ham-sur-Heure-Nalinnes. This list is part of Belgium's national heritage.

Object	Year/architect	Town/section	Address	Coordinates	Number^{?}	Image
Castle of Ham-sur-Heure ^{(nl)} ^{(fr)}		Ham-sur-Heure-Nalinnes		50.321672°N 4.392615°E	56086-CLT-0001-01 Info	Kasteel van Ham-sur-Heure
Chapel of Saint-Roch ^{(nl)} ^{(fr)}		Ham-sur-Heure-Nalinnes	Ham-sur-Heure	50.321686°N 4.387806°E	56086-CLT-0003-01 Info	
Church of Sainte Vierge ^{(nl)} ^{(fr)}		Ham-sur-Heure-Nalinnes	Nalinnes	50.324819°N 4.444998°E	56086-CLT-0004-01 Info	Kerk de la Sainte-Vierge
Drève de la Ferree ^{(nl)} ^{(fr)}		Ham-sur-Heure-Nalinnes	Nalinnes	50.345457°N 4.455939°E	56086-CLT-0005-01 Info	Drève de la Ferrée
fortified house ^{(nl)} ^{(fr)}		Ham-sur-Heure-Nalinnes	Nalinnes	50.324416°N 4.444936°E	56086-CLT-0006-01 Info	
Forest "Bois de la Ferree" ^{(nl)} ^{(fr)}		Ham-sur-Heure-Nalinnes	Ham-sur-Heure-Nalinnes	50.355110°N 4.463470°E	56086-CLT-0007-01 Info	
Totality of 17th-century tower of the castle de la Pasture, and conservation of the castle, the farm, the park and the land occupied by the farm and its surroundings ^{(nl)} ^{(fr)}		Ham-sur-Heure-Nalinnes	Chemin Sainte-Barbe, te Marbaix-la-Tour	50.331210°N 4.376152°E	56086-CLT-0008-01 Info	

== See also ==
- List of protected heritage sites in Hainaut (province)
- Ham-sur-Heure-Nalinnes
