= Marshal General of France =

Head of a French army

Marshal General of France, originally Marshal General of the King's Camps and Armies (French: maréchal général des camps et armées du roi), was a title signifying that its holder exercised authority over all French armies, at a time when a Marshal of France usually commanded only one army.

The title was bestowed only on marshals, generally when the office of the Constable of France was vacant or, after 1626, suppressed. Unlike the title of marshal, the title of marshal general was rarely granted to active military commanders. Rather, especially in the 18th and 19th centuries, it served as an honorary, end-of-career distinction awarded to particularly distinguished or loyal marshals.

== List of titleholders ==
Turenne's Arms as Marshal-General of France
Saxe's arms as Marshal-General of France

Six in the pre-revolutionary kingdom of France:

- Charles de Gontaut, duc de Biron (1562–1602):
  - Admiral of France, 1592
  - Admiral and Marshal, 26 January 1594
  - unclear when promoted to Marshal General
  - executed in 1602
- François de Bonne, duc de Lesdiguières (1543–1626):
  - Marshal, 27 September 1609
  - Marshal General, 30 March 1621
  - Constable of France, 6 July 1622
- Henri de La Tour d'Auvergne, vicomte de Turenne (1611–1675):
  - Marshal, 16 November 1643
  - Marshal General, 4 April 1660
- Claude-Louis-Hector de Villars (1653–1734):
  - Marshal, 20 October 1702
  - Marshal General, 18 October 1733
- Maurice, comte de Saxe (1696–1750):
  - Marshal, 26 March 1744
  - Marshal General, 12 January 1747
- Victor François de Broglie, 2nd Duke of Broglie (1718–1804):
  - Marshal, 1759
  - Marshal General, 1789
  - Broglie emigrated the same day the king signed the title papers. He therefore never exercised the functions of marshal general and was removed from the list of marshals of France in 1792.

One during the July Monarchy under the House of Orléans' sole, constitutional king, Louis Philippe:

- Jean-de-Dieu Soult, duc de Dalmatie (1769–1851):
  - Marshal of the Empire, 19 May 1804
  - Marshal General, 15 September 1847

== Sources ==
- Quid.fr (French language online encyclopedia)
- web.genealogie: les militaires (also online)
- Harper Encyclopedia of Military Biography, edited by Trevor N. Dupuy et al. (most dates are from the latter)
