= Auguste Marie Raymond d'Arenberg =

French-Belgian aristocrat (1753–1833)

The Most Excellent Count of La Marck

Member of the Constituent Assembly for Nord
- In office 9 July 1789 – 30 September 1791
- Preceded by: Himself at the Estates General
- Succeeded by: Pierre Joseph Duhem
- Constituency: Le Quesnoy

Deputy to the Estates General for the Second Estate
- In office 6 May 1789 – 9 July 1789
- Constituency: Hainaut

Personal details
- Born: Auguste Marie Raymond; 30 August 1753 Brussels, Duchy of Brabant, Austrian Netherlands
- Died: 26 September 1833 (aged 80) Brussels, Province of Brabant, Belgium
- Party: National Party
- Spouse: Marie-Françoise Le Danois (m. 1774; died 1810)
- Children: Ernst Engelbert
- Parent(s): Charles, Duke of Arenberg and Louise Marguerite, Countess of La Marck
- Profession: Military officer, diplomat

Military service
- Allegiance: France; Austria; Netherlands
- Branch/service: French Royal Army; Austrian Imperial Army; Royal Netherlands Army
- Years of service: 1773–1815
- Rank: Field Marshal; Generalmajor; Lieutenant general
- Battles/wars: American Revolutionary War; Brabant Revolution; French Revolutionary Wars; Coalition Wars

Prince Auguste Marie Raymond d'Arenberg, Count of La Marck Grandee of Spain (30 August 1753 – 26 September 1833), was a French-Belgian aristocrat. Part of the House of Arenberg, who at this time still held the rank of sovereign princes, he was the second son and fourth child of Charles, 5th Duke of Arenberg.

== Family ==
Prince Auguste was born on 30 August 1753 in Brussels to the Duke of Arenberg, a field-marshal in the Austrian army and a Seven Years' War veteran. His brother was Louis Engelbert, 6th Duke of Arenberg.

== Career ==
Though the House of Arenberg had long aligned itself with the Austrian army, Prince Auguste's maternal grandfather, Louis Engelbert, offered his regiment in the French service to Prince Auguste since he did not have a son; it was further arranged that he would take on the title Count of La Marck following his grandfather's death. The Duke requested permission from Queen Maria Theresa for Prince Auguste to join the French service, which she granted. In 1770, at age 17, Prince August attended the wedding of Marie Antoinette and Louis XVI, which made him a lifelong defender of Marie Antoinette. At age 20, five years after joining the military, Prince Auguste joined his regiment in the South of France, where he remained for a year before returning to court as the successor of his grandfather's title.

Prince Auguste fought in India under Count de Bussy and was severely wounded. Upon his return to Paris, he was involved in a duel with Karl Peyron (1757–1784), a young former Swedish officer from his regiment who had led a revolt after he found out he was being shipped to India as opposed to North America which he favored. The revolt failed and he was discharged from the regiment. Peyron returned to Sweden and was eventually employed as a servant to the Swedish King Gustav III. During the King's visit to Paris, Peyron encountered Prince Auguste and the old grievance was renewed. Prince Auguste killed Peyron in the duel by a thrust of his sword through Peyrons eye into his brain, but not before Peyron stabbed him in the lung with his sword. After convalescing, Prince Auguste returned to his career in the military. His regiment became strongly disciplined and later became a model for the rest of the service. He was appointed inspector-general of infantry and vice-president of the committee for regulating the tactics of the troops of the line.

He left the military in 1789 to join the court, where he remained largely apolitical and did not seek the monarch's levée or the minister's ante-chamber. He became close with Honoré Gabriel Riqueti, comte de Mirabeau and served as the mediator between the queen and Mirabeau. After the march on Versailles, he consulted Mirabeau as to what measures the king ought to take, and Mirabeau drew up a state paper that eventually fell to the wayside due to changing circumstances. During this time, Prince Auguste became a member first of the Estates General, then of the Constituent Assembly. However, he lost command of his regiment by the National Assembly and he eventually left France, choosing instead to join the Austrian army as major-general. Outside of his military service, he also worked as a diplomat on several occasions.

Prince Auguste attempted to return to France after his brother became a senator and count in the First French Empire but was prevented from doing so by Napoleon. He remained in Vienna until moving to Brussels in 1814, where he was made lieutenant-general in the military by the new Dutch king. He retired after the Belgian Revolution in 1830.

== Personal life ==
During his life, he had homes in Raismes, Valenciennes, and at Versailles. He married in 1776 and had one son. His granddaughter Eleanor married her cousin, Engelbert, 8th Duke of Arenberg, in 1868. After his retirement in 1830 he began collecting art for his residences. After his death in 1833, his collection was given to Prosper Louis, 7th Duke of Arenberg.
