= Siege of Maastricht (1748) =

Part of the War of Austrian Succession

- Part of the War of the Austrian Succession
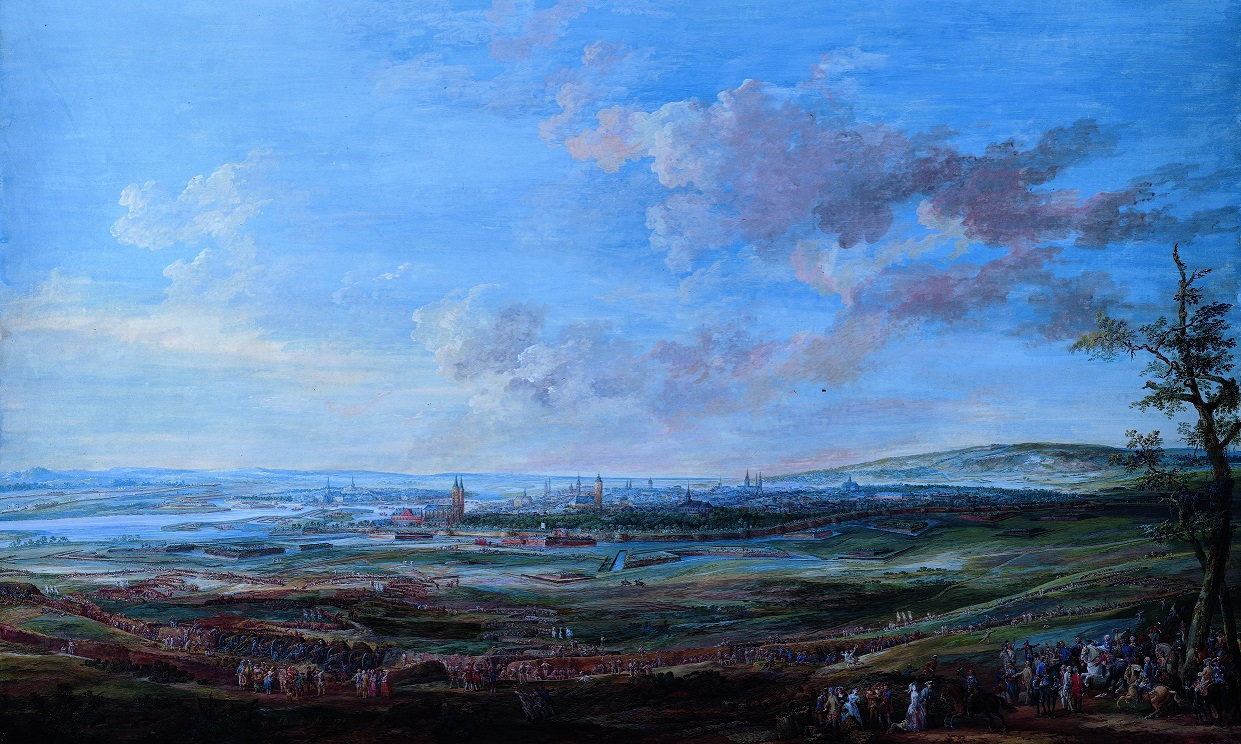
Date	15 April – 7 May 1748
Location	Maastricht, Dutch Republic 50°52′00″N 5°40′00″E
Result	French victory

Belligerents
Kingdom of France	Dutch Republic; Holy Roman Empire

Commanders and leaders
Maurice de Saxe	Hobbe Esaias van Aylva

Strength
80,000 men	9,800 men; 600 guns

Casualties and losses
2,000 casualties	839–2,000 casualties 600 guns captured
- Location within Netherlands Siege of Maastricht (1748) (Europe)

The siege of Maastricht was a campaign during the War of the Austrian Succession which took place in April–May 1748.

== History ==
A French force under the command of Maurice de Saxe besieged and captured the Dutch city of Maastricht in the final few months of the campaign in the Low Countries. After a relatively long siege the garrison of Maastricht capitulated and marched out with the honours of war. Maastricht was returned along with France's conquests in the Austrian Netherlands according to the Treaty of Aix-la-Chapelle signed in 1748.

Among the defenders were the Austro-Walloon Regiment of Los Rios, commanded by its Colonel Jean Charles Joseph, Count of Merode, Marquis of Deynze; Charles, 5th Duke of Arenberg (Jean Charles' brother-in-law)

== Bibliography ==
- Bodart, Gaston (1908). Militär-historisches Kriegs-Lexikon (1618–1905).
- Browning, Reed (1993). The War of the Austrian Succession. Stroud: Sutton Publishing. ISBN 978-0-7509-0578-7.
- Van Nimwegen, Olaf (2002). De republiek der Verenigde Nederlanden als grote mogenheid 1740-1748 (in Dutch). Amsterdam: De Bataafsche Leeuw. ISBN 978-90-6707-540-4.
