= Ham-sur-Heure Castle =

Castle in Wallonia, Belgium

- Wallonia, Belgium
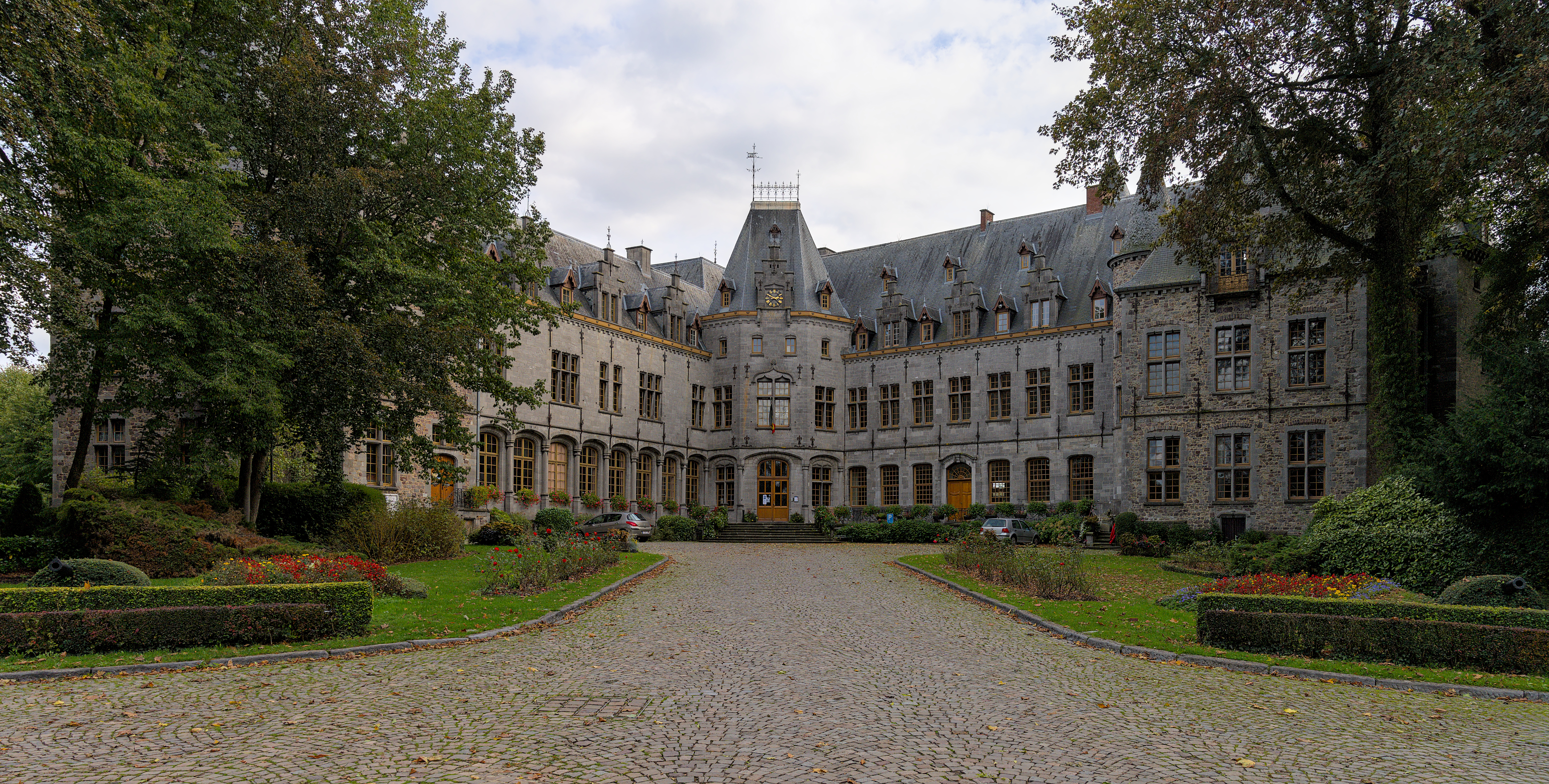
- Courtyard

Site information
- Type: Castle

Location
- Coordinates: 50.321°N 4.392°E

Ham-sur-Heure Castle (French: Château d'Ham-sur-Heure) is a castle in Ham-sur-Heure, a village in the municipality of Ham-sur-Heure-Nalinnes, province of Hainaut, Wallonia, Belgium.

From 1491 to 1941 it belonged to the de Mérode family, and from 1941 to 1952 to the descendants of Charles John d'Oultremont. They sold it to the municipal authorities of Ham-sur-Heure, who used it as their town hall. After the local government reorganisation of 1977 it became the town hall of the present municipality of Ham-sur-Heure-Nalinnes.

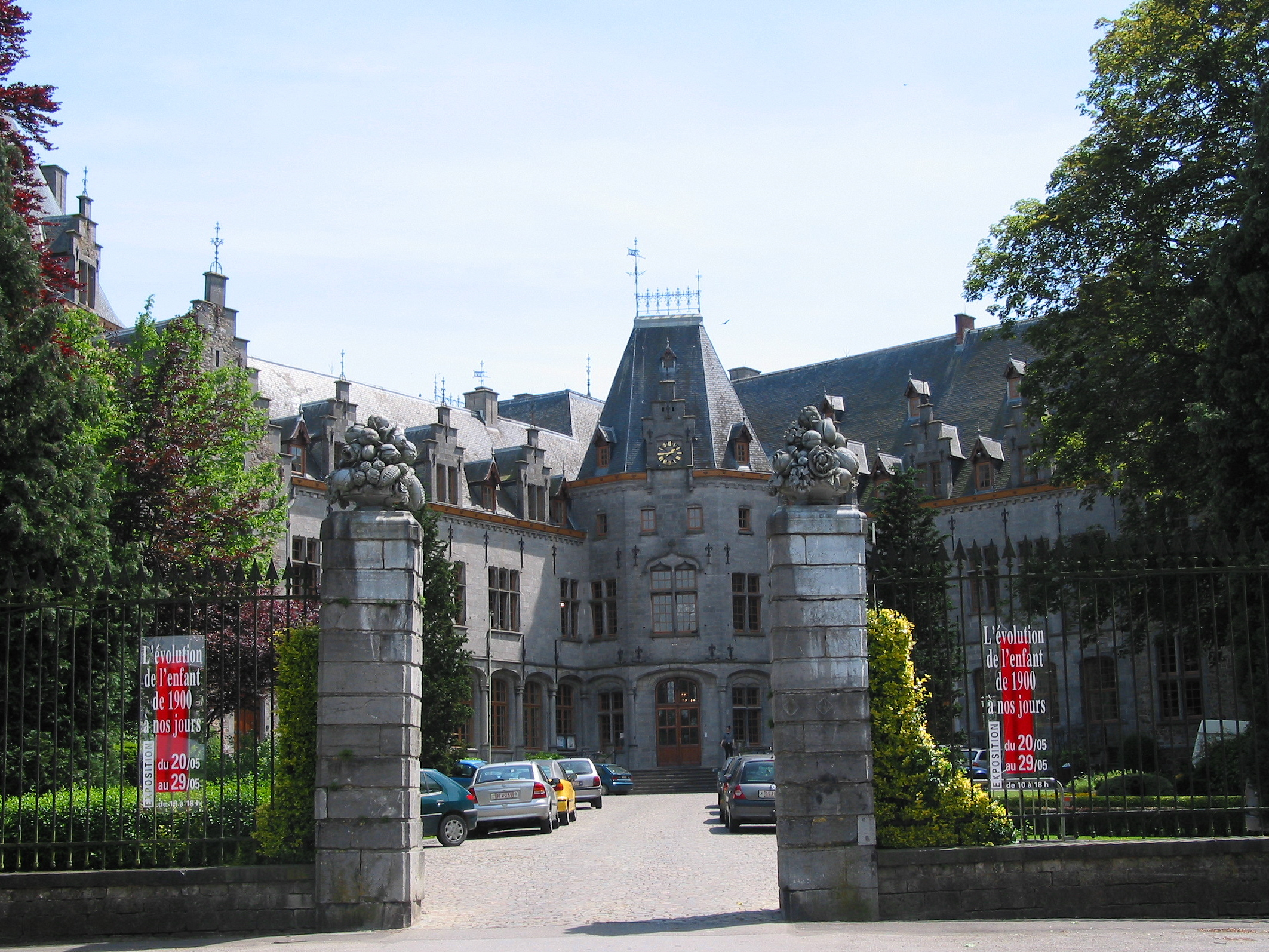
Courtyard

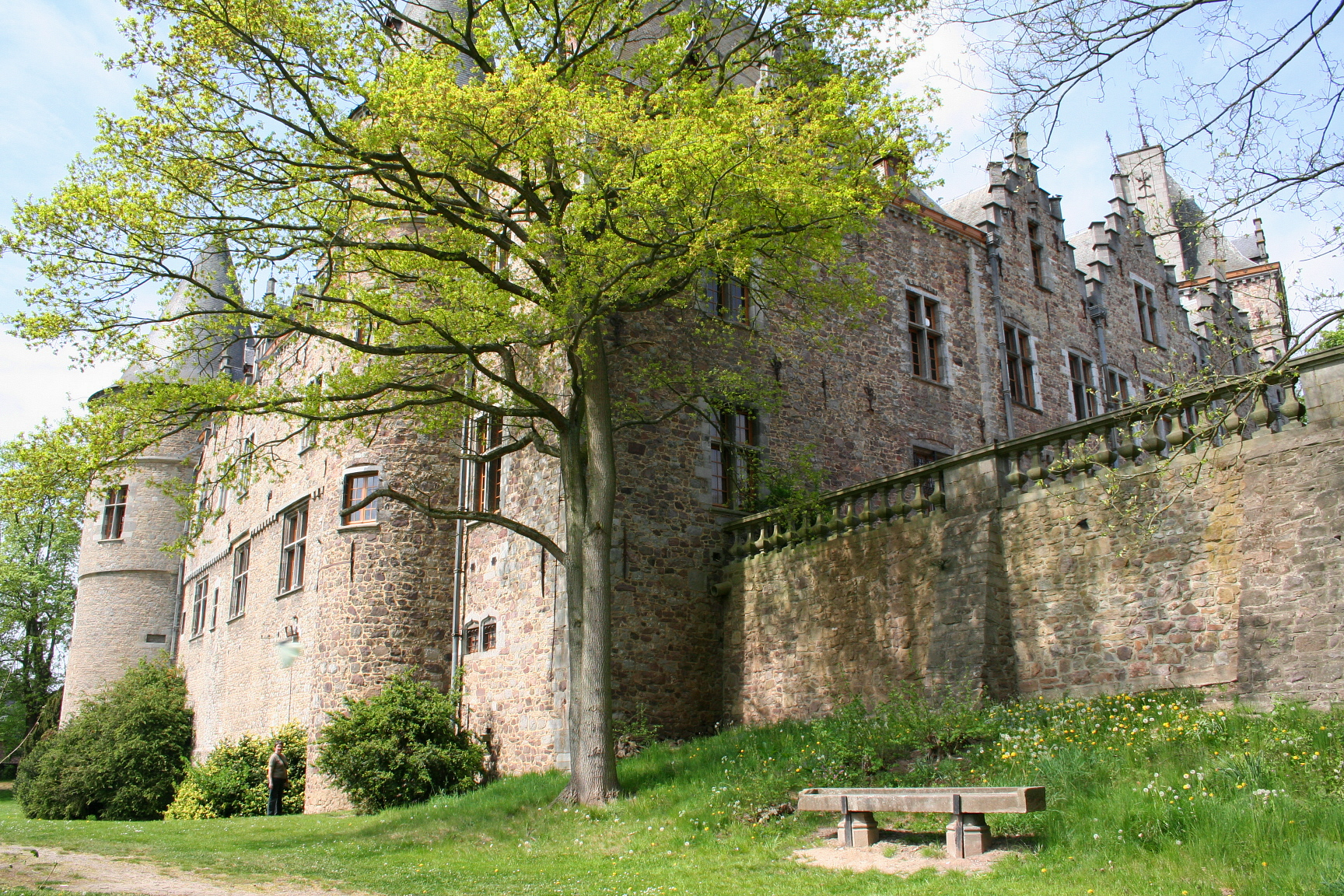
The château from behind

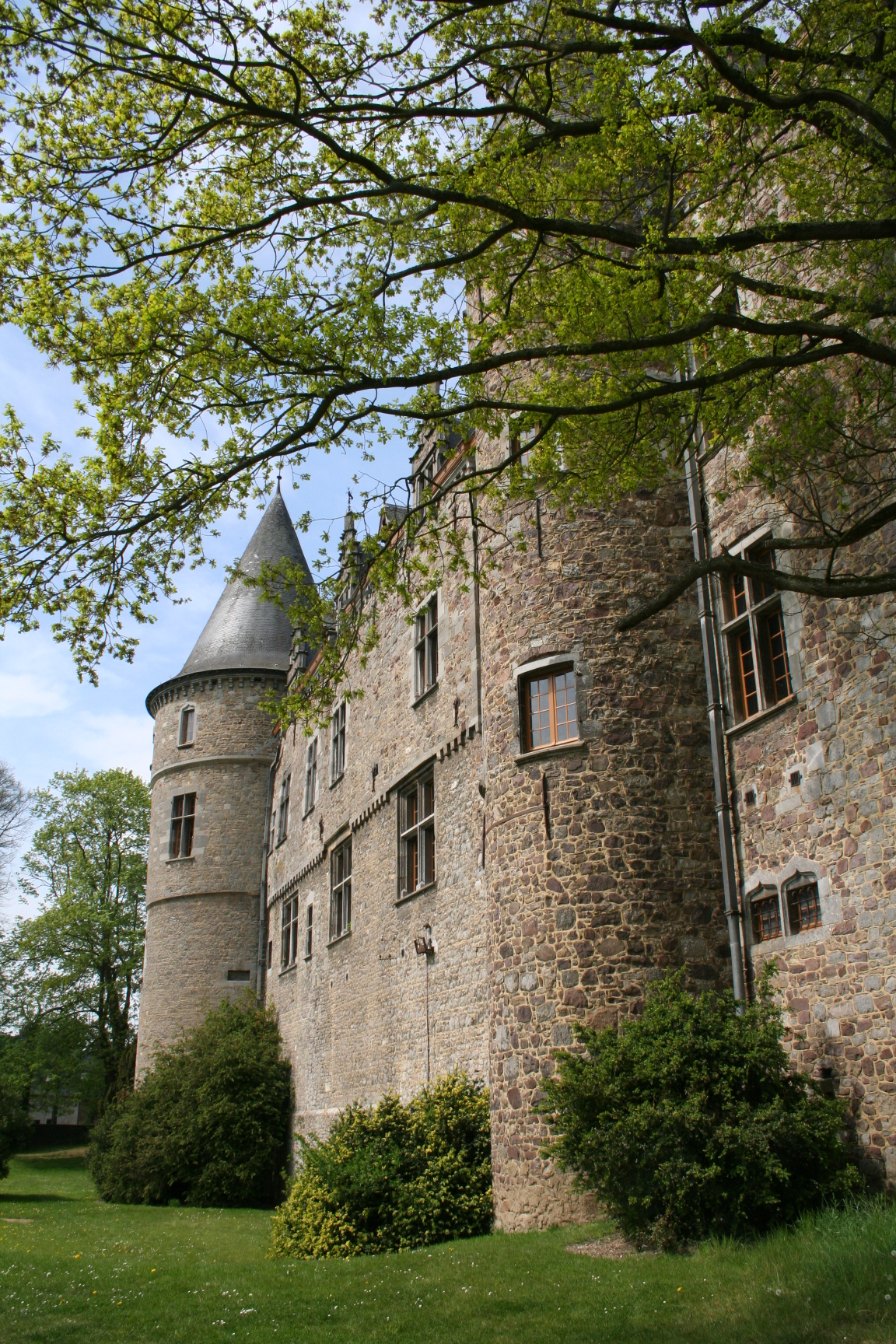
The château from behind

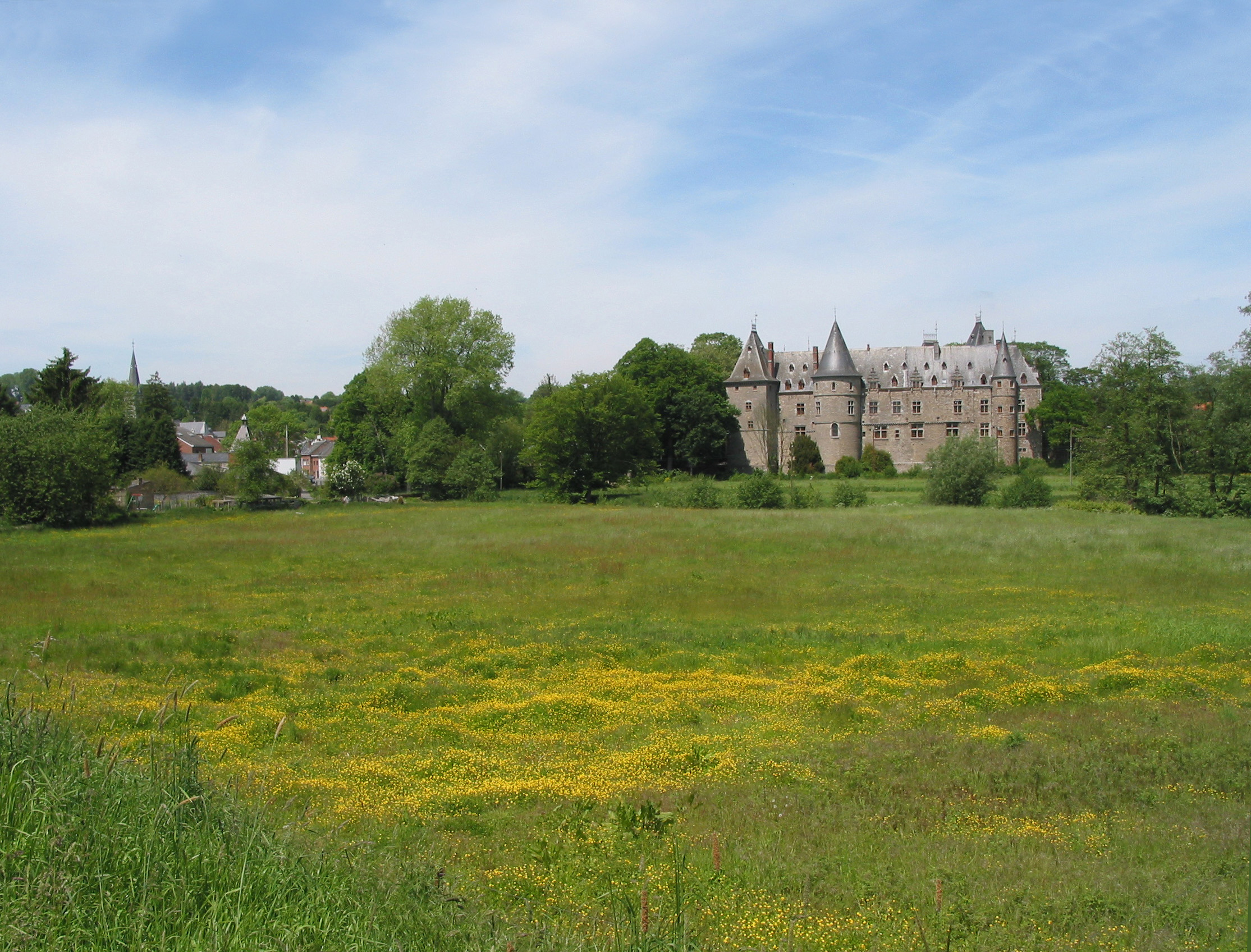
The château from across the fields

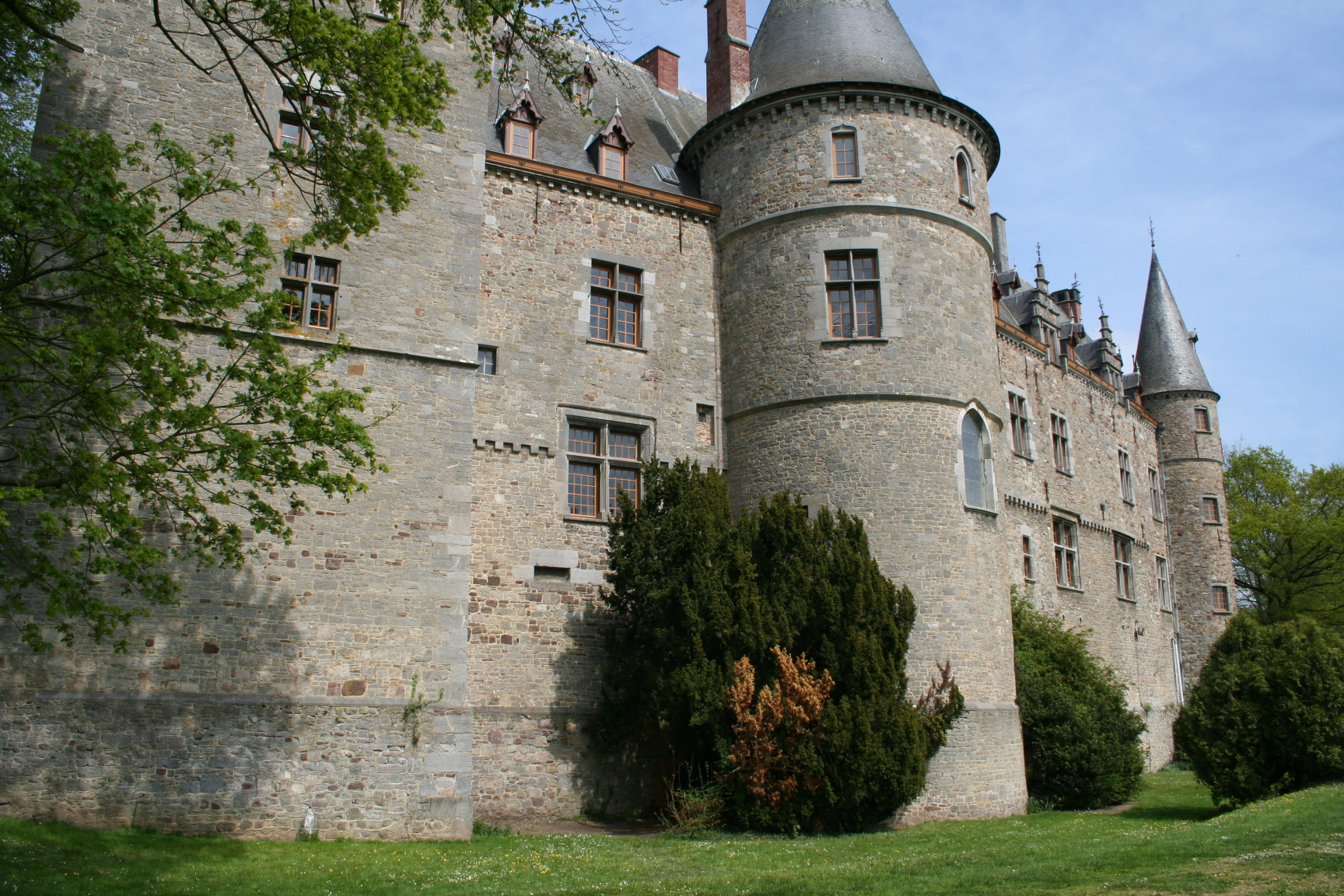
South facade

== See also ==
- List of castles in Belgium
- Jean Charles Joseph, Count of Merode, Marquis of Deynze, born and dead in Ham-sur-Heure Castle (1719-1774)
