= Battle of Prague (1741) =

1741 battle

Siege of Prague
- Part of the War of the Austrian Succession
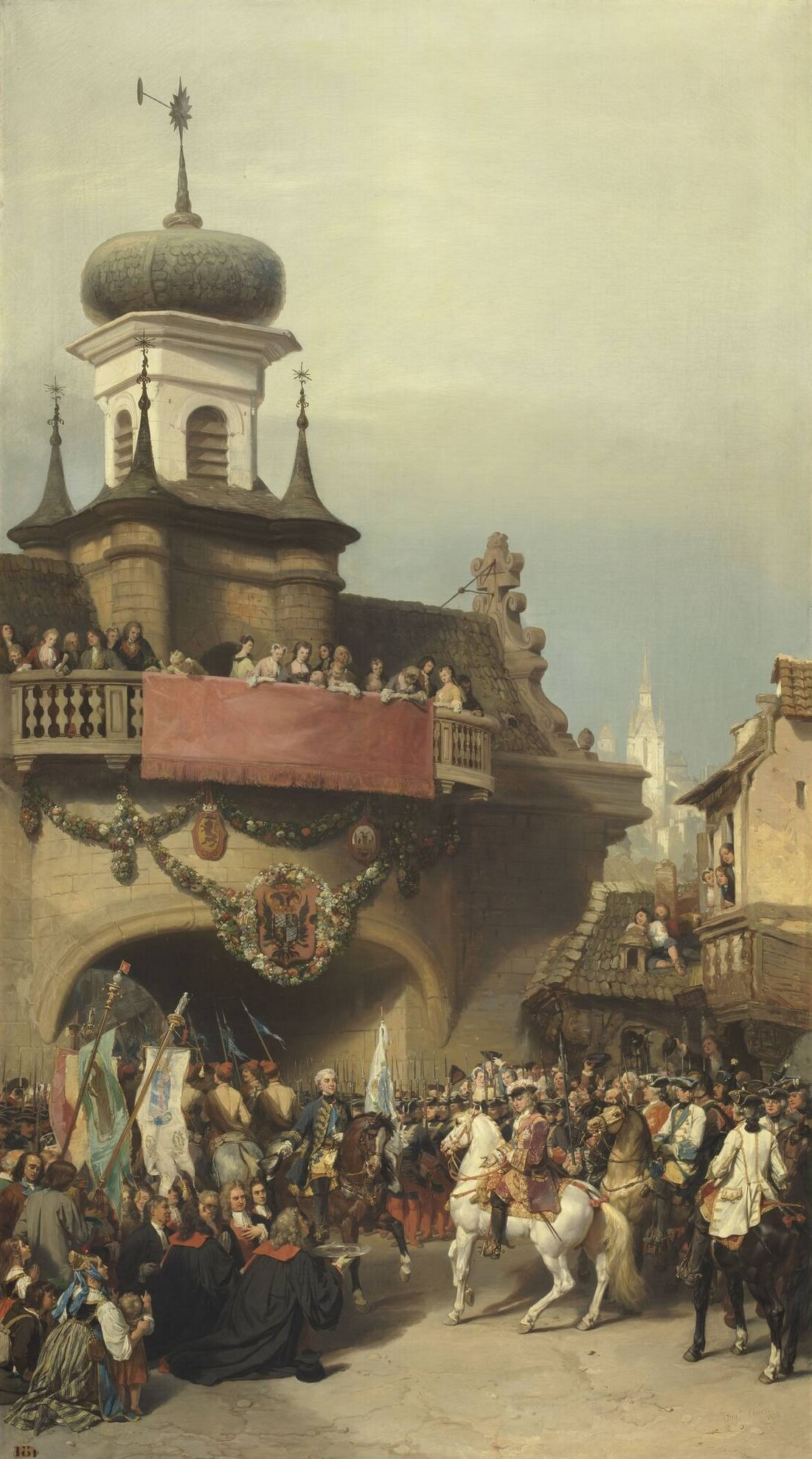
- Maurice de Saxe presents the keys of the city of Prague to the Elector of Bavaria, 26 November 1741 by Auguste Couder, 1838
| Date | 25–26 November 1741 |
| Location | Prague, Bohemia |
| Result | Franco-Bavarian-Saxon victory |

Belligerents
| Austria | France; Bavaria; Saxony |

Commanders and leaders
| (Habsburg monarchy) Unknown | (Kingdom of France) Maurice de Saxe |

Casualties and losses
| Entire garrison surrenders | Light |

The battle of Prague (1741) was a successful French capture of the Austrian city Prague.

== Background ==
In continuance of the policy of his father, Charles of Bavaria aspired to an even higher rank. As son-in-law of Joseph I, Holy Roman Emperor, Charles rejected the Pragmatic Sanction of 1713 and claimed the German territories of the Habsburg dynasty after the death of emperor Charles VI in 1740. By the Treaty of Nymphenburg, which was concluded in July 1741, Charles became allied with France and Spain against Austria.

During the War of the Austrian Succession, Charles invaded Upper Austria in 1741 and planned to conquer Vienna, but his allied French troops under the Duc de Belle-Isle were instead redirected to Bohemia.

== Battle ==
Maurice de Saxe, an experienced commander renowned for his intellectual grasp of the principles of war, discreetly went forward to reconnoiter the walled city's defenses in person and launched a surprise operation. With help of Colonel François de Chevert, he outlined a plan for a body of grenadiers to assault the walls by night. In order to avoid alerting the small Prague garrison, the assault would be made without firing muskets; only bayonets were used to dispatch the soldiers on guard duty. On the night of 25 to 26 November, the Franco-Bavarian-Saxon troops climbed onto the parapet of a poorly defended section of the walls and had taken possession before the garrison realized what was afoot. The city gate was opened, and Saxe's cavalry rode in, leaving Prague's defenders no choice but to surrender.

== Aftermath ==
Charles Albert was crowned King of Bohemia the following day and later also briefly held the title of Holy Roman Emperor. However, Prague's capture did not significantly alter the course of the war, since the following month Austrian general Ludwig Andreas von Khevenhüller launched a winter counter-offensive, reversing most of the enemy's gains. Prague would be liberated by the Austrians again in December 1742.
