= Prosper Louis, 7th Duke of Arenberg =

Duke of Arenberg (1785–1861)

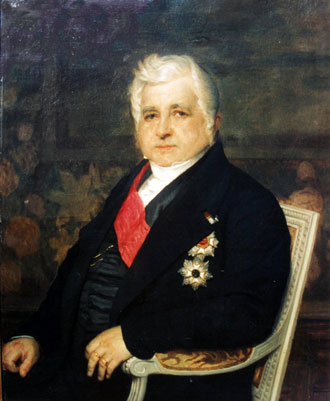
Prosper Louis, 7th Duke of Arenberg

Prosper Louis, 7th Duke of Arenberg (28 April 1785, Enghien – 27 February 1861) was the Duke of Arenberg, a principality of the Holy Roman Empire. He was also the 13th Duke of Aarschot, 2nd Duke of Meppen and 2nd prince of Recklinghausen.

In 1801, Louis Engelbert, Duke of Arenberg, Prosper's father, lost the former Duchy of Arenberg on the left bank of the Rhine but received a larger duchy on the right bank in 1803.

In 1808 Arenberg married Stéphanie Tascher de La Pagerie (1788-1832), niece of Joséphine de Beauharnais (Empress of the French Empire).

His wife was given the present Hôtel de Chimay, known as the Hôtel de La Pagerie in Paris in 1808.

He was granted new lands by Joséphine's husband Napoleon Bonaparte (expanding his holdings from 413 km^{2} to 3,388 km^{2}) and gained the additional titles of Duke of Meppen and Prince of Recklinghausen. He lost his sovereignty over his lands in 1810 when Arenberg was mediatised into France but retain the style of HSH (His Serene Highness), which is still used by his descendant.

Arenberg was colonel of the Belgian Chevau-Légers d'Arenberg which fought in the Peninsular War, during which he was wounded and captured by the British at the Battle of Arroyo dos Molinos on 28 October 1811.

In England he was on parole, first at Oswestry and then Bridgnorth. After an incident with the Commissary he was ordered by the Transport Board to be taken to the Norman Cross Prison. A number of prisoners had broken parole and daily reporting was being implemented, which was taken to impugn on his honour. After time spent at Norman Cross, he agreed to comply with this requirement and parole was agreed. An offer to exchange him was said to have been declined by Napoleon, as the two officers were not of equal rank. He was later provided passports.

Arenberg took no part in the 1815 Waterloo Campaign other than to attend the Duchess of Richmond's ball, but his contacts among the British did not save his lands which were lost when they were overrun by the Prussians and the Hanoverians. In 1816 he divorced his first wife and married again in 1819 to Princess Maria-Ludmille de Lobkowicz. Maria-Ludmille and Arenberg had seven children, the third eldest and the first boy Engelbert Auguste, inherited his father's titles becoming the 8th Duke of Arenberg. A younger son, Charles, was the second husband of the former Princess of Serbia Júlia Hunyady de Kéthely.

== Art collection ==
In 1833 he inherited the art collection of Auguste Marie Raymond d'Arenberg, who began intensively collecting art from his retirement in 1830 until his death in 1833. Many of these works were catalogued in the ducal palace in Brussels in 1829 & 1855 and later again in 1904 in Düsseldorf.

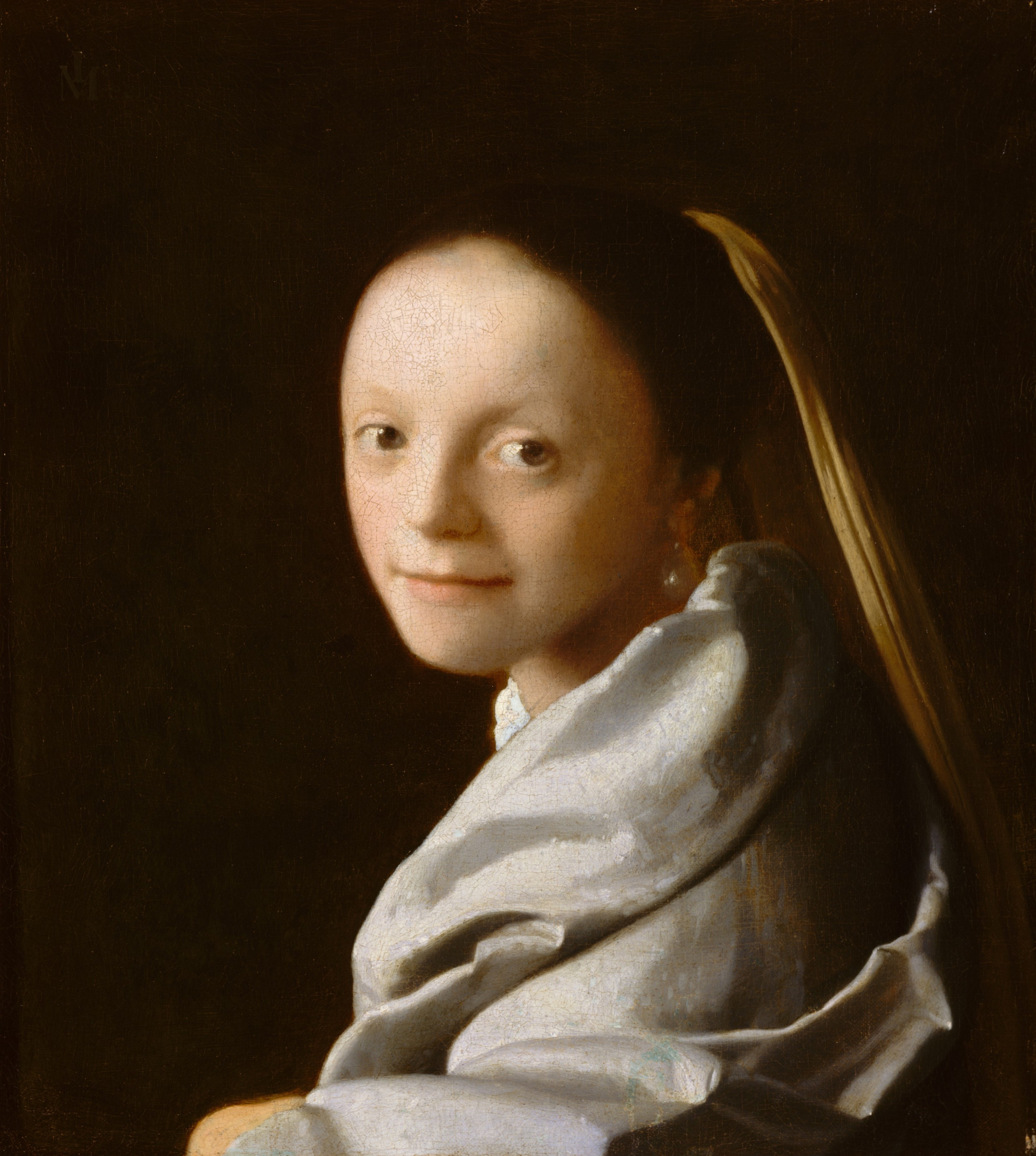
Study of a Young Woman, by Johannes Vermeer

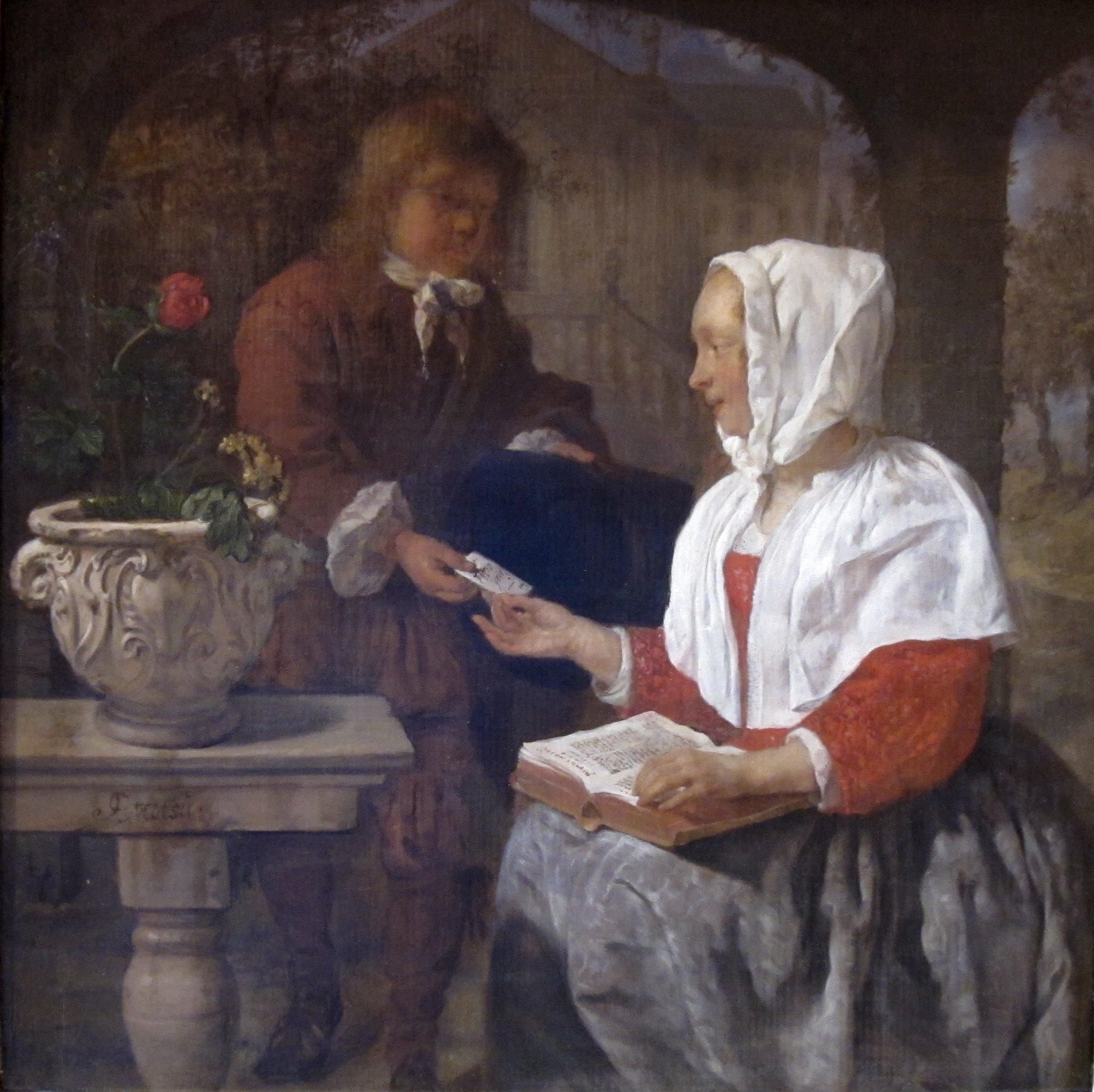
A Girl Receiving a Letter, by Gabriel Metsu

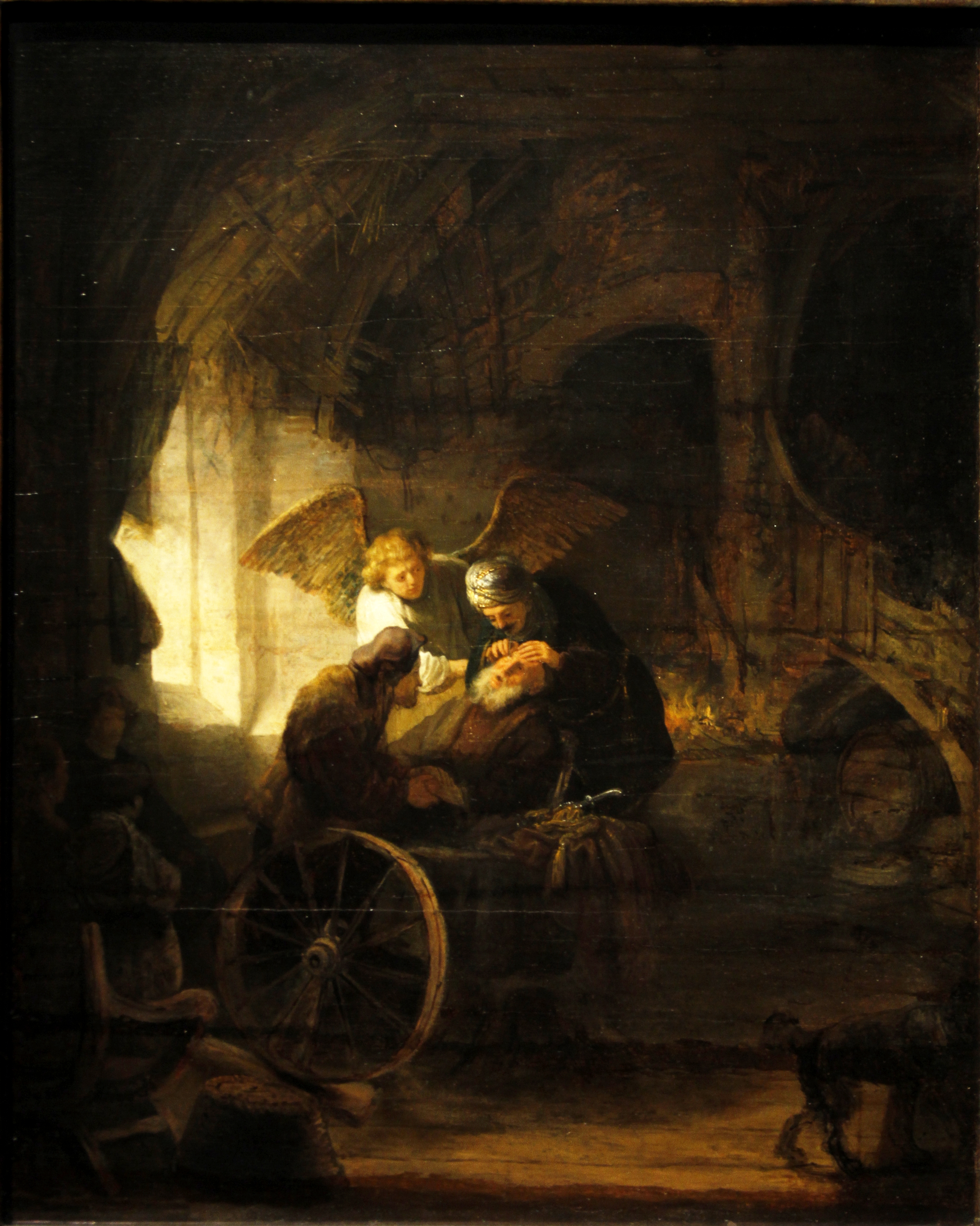
Tobias Healing his Father by Rembrandt

== See also ==
- Arenberg

== References and notes ==
French nobility
Preceded by Louis Engelbert, 6th Duke of Arenberg	Duke of Arenberg; 1810–1861	Succeeded by Engelbert, 8th Duke of Arenberg
