= Princess Marie Victoire d'Arenberg =

Princess Marie Victoire
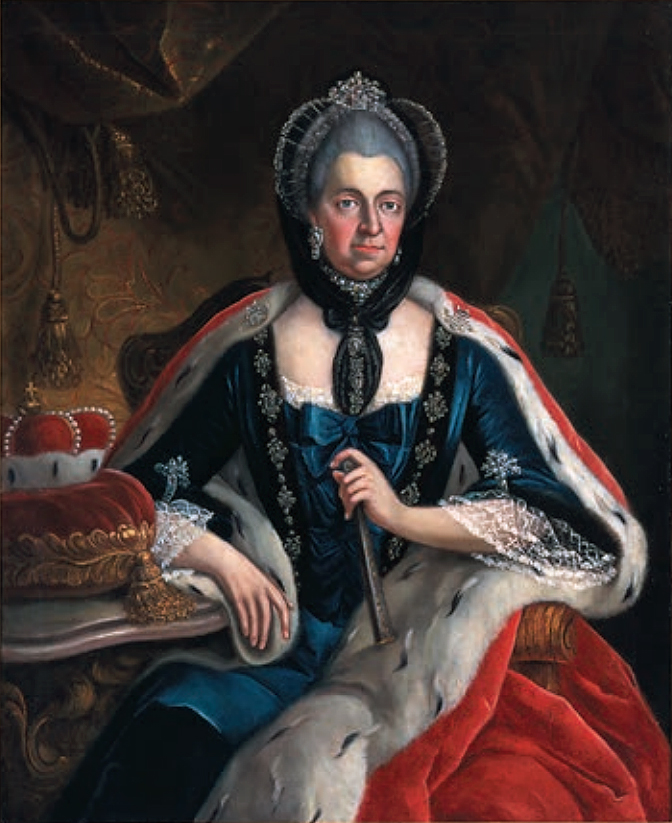
- Portrait by Joseph Wolfgang Hauwiller

Margravine consort of Baden-Baden
- Tenure: 22 October 1761 – 21 October 1771
- Born: 26 October 1714; Brussels, Belgium
- Died: 13 April 1793 (aged 78); Strasbourg
- Burial: Stiftskirche, Baden-Baden
- Spouse: Augustus George, Margrave of Baden-Baden
- House: Arenberg (by birth); Zähringen (by marriage)
- Father: Léopold Philippe, Duke of Arenberg
- Mother: Maria Lodovica Francesca Pignatelli

Princess Marie Victoire of Arenberg (Marie Victoire Pauline; 26 October 1714 – 13 April 1793) was a member of the House of Arenberg and later the Margravine of Baden-Baden as consort of Augustus George of Baden-Baden. She is credited for her charitable nature setting up various religious orders in her adopted Baden-Baden where she was known as Maria Viktoria.

== Biography ==
Marie Victoire was born in Brussels the eldest daughter of Léopold Philippe, Duke of Arenberg. Her mother was Maria Lodovica Francesca Pignatelli, Duchess of Bisaccia (1696-1766), a grand-daughter of Ottone Enrico del Carretto, who was an Imperial Army commander, like her own father. As a member of the House of Arenberg, she was allowed the style of Serene Highness reflecting the Arenbergs status as Princes of the Holy Roman Empire.

She was one of six children, her only surviving brother being Charles Marie Raymond, Duke of Arenberg, another distinguished member of the imperial army. She was a childhood friend of the future Empress Maria Theresa.

She was a cousin of Maria Henriette de La Tour d'Auvergne, wife of Count Palatine John Christian and mother of the last Wittelsbach Elector of Bavaria.

Marie Victoire was a childhood friend of Empress Maria Theresa. She received a strict Roman Catholic education and in later life, spent much of her larger personal fortune on charitable foundations related to the Catholic Church. She was also active in the care of children and Catholic education of young women. She also had a good education in music and the arts. She was one of only six women outside Imperial family who were admitted to the Order of the Starry Cross during the 18th century.

On 7 December 1735 she married Margrave Augustus George of Baden-Baden, youngest son of Louis William of Baden-Baden and Sibylle of Saxe-Lauenburg. Originally destined for the church, he left his ecclesiastical career in 1735. He was the brother of the ruling Margrave Louis George of Baden-Baden.

At the death of her brother in law Louis George in 1761, her husband succeeded as margrave making Marie Victoire, known as Maria Viktoria in Germany, the most important female at the court of Baden-Baden displacing Louis Georges widow Maria Anna Josepha of Bavaria, sister of Maximilian III Joseph, Elector of Bavaria.

While Margravine, she set up an Augustinian choir for the women of Rastatt, the main seat of the rulers of Baden-Baden. Her husband died in 1771 leaving no heirs of his own and thus Baden-Baden went to Charles Frederick, Grand Duke of Baden, leaving the defunct Maria Viktoria without a home.

She moved from Rastatt and took up residence in Ottersweier where she set up a convent. In the convent school girls learned all the skills which they would need as future mothers and teachers. In 1767 she bequeathed most of her property of a foundation to preserve the school beyond their death.

She died in Strasbourg aged 78. She was buried at the Stiftskirche in Baden-Baden beside her husband.

== Ancestry ==
Ancestors of Princess Marie Victoire d'Arenberg

8. Charles Eugene d'Arenberg, Duke of Arenberg
4. Philippe Charles d'Arenberg, Duke of Arenberg
9. Marie Henriette de Cusance et de Vergy, Countess of Champlitte
2. Léopold Philippe d'Arenberg, Duke of Arenberg
10. Ottone Enrico del Carretto, Marchese of Savona and Grana
5. Maria Enrietta del Carretto, Marchesa of Savona and Grana
11. Countess Maria Theresia of Herberstein
1. Marie Victoire of Arenberg
12. Carlo Pignatelli, Duke of Bisaccia
6. Niccolo Pignatelli, Duke of Bisaccia
13. Chiara del Giudice
3. Maria Francesca Pignatelli, Duchess of Bisaccia, Countess of Egmond
14. Philip Louis, Count of Egmond
7. Maria Clara Angelica van Egmond
15. Maria Ferdinanda de Croÿ

Princess Marie Victoire d'Arenberg House of Arenberg Born: 26 October 1714 Died: 13 April 1793
Royal titles
Preceded by Maria Anna Josepha of Bavaria	Margravine consort of Baden-Baden; 22 October 1761 – 21 October 1771	Succeeded by Caroline Louise of Hesse-Darmstadt
