= François de Chevert =

French general (1695–1769)

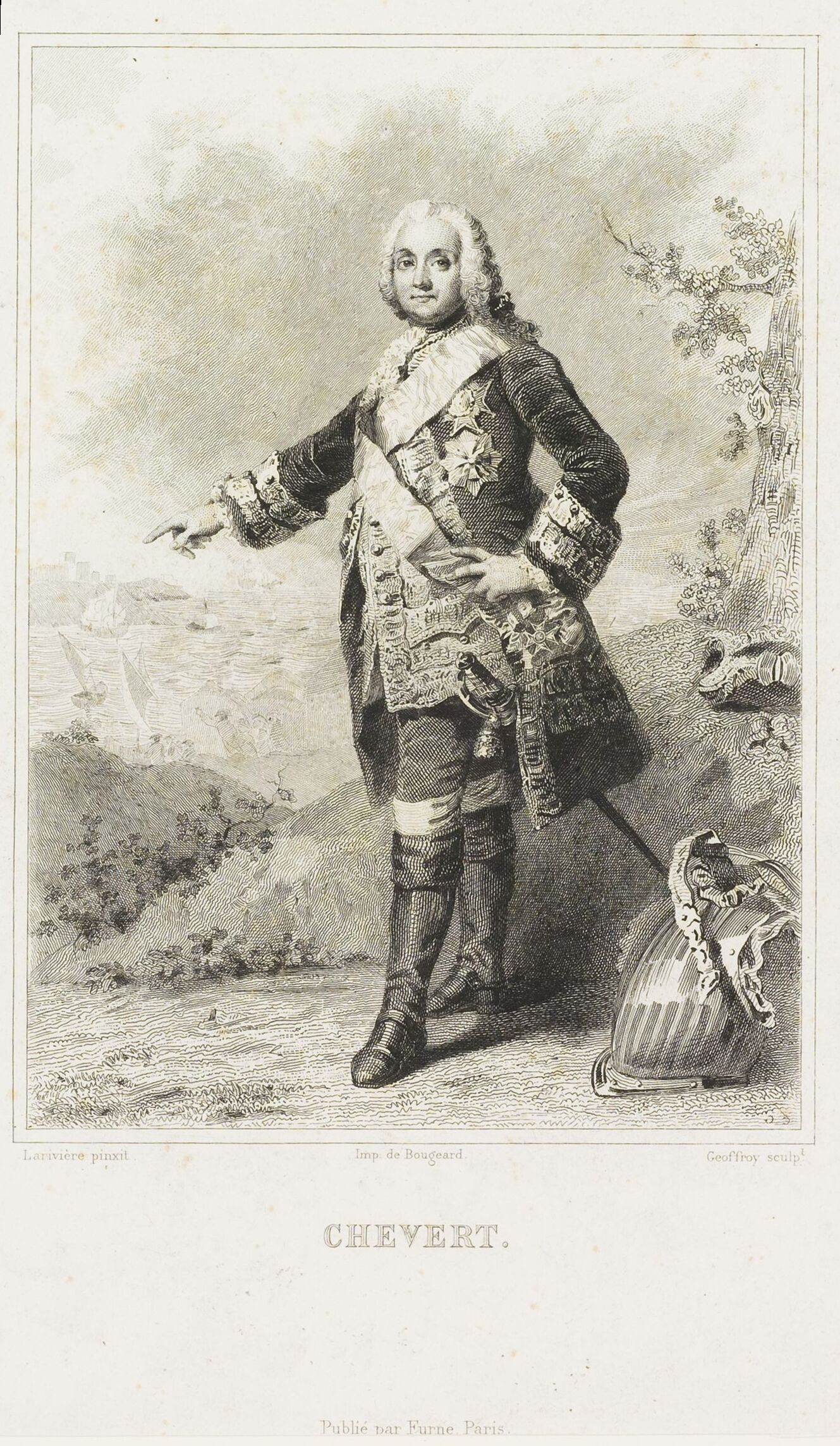
François de Chevert

François de Chevert (2 February 1695 – 24 January 1769) was a French general.

Chevert was born in Verdun, Three Bishoprics. He entered service in 1706, became major in Beauce's regiment in Toul in 1728, later in 1739 lieutenant-colonel. He distinguished himself in Flanders, Piedmont and Germany and was rewarded by a more important command, as lieutenant-colonel of a grenadier regiment. As part of the French force, he and his grenadiers effected the bloodless capture of Prague in 1741 during the War of the Austrian Succession. At the end of the Austrian Siege of Prague the following year he defended the city for eighteen days with only 1,800 men not sick or wounded, surrendering on honourable terms on 26 December. Promoted to brigadier, he took part in the operations in the Dauphiné and Italy, most famously in the Battle of Casteldelfino, and became maréchal-de-camp in 1744.

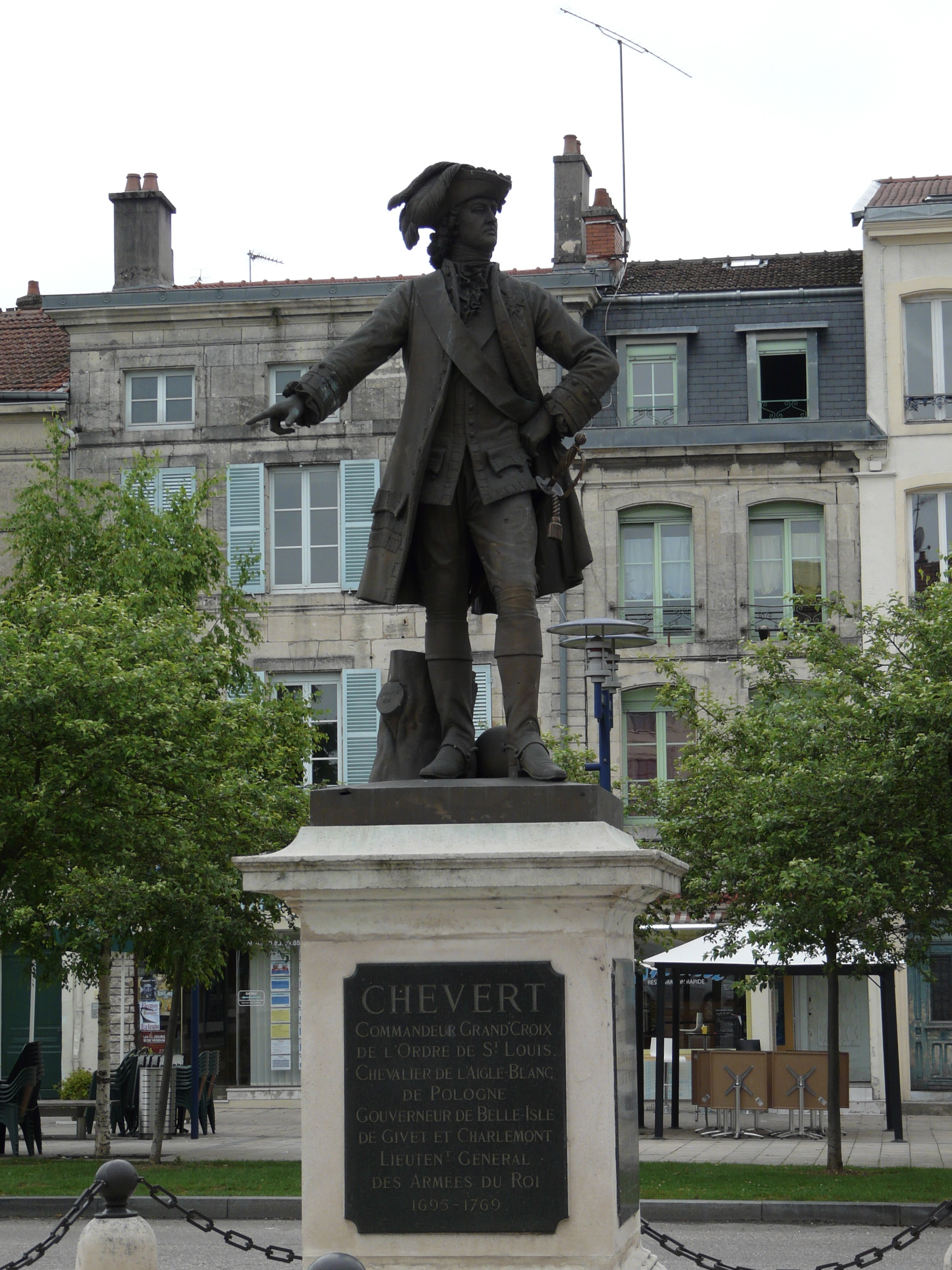
Chevert statue in Verdun

During the campaign in the Provence, he seized the isles of Sainte-Marguerite, after which coup he was named lieutenant-general in 1748. With this title, he commanded the French flanking force at the victory of Hastenbeck. In the following year he also commanded the flanking force in the French victory at Lutterburg.

During this career in the course of which he passed through all important ranks of the hierarchy, Chevert seems to have known nothing but success, save for one small defeat at the battle of Meer (or Mehr) in 1758, where a large component of his corps consisted of militia and inexperienced regular troops. He was a Major by the time he was awarded the order of Chevalier de Saint-Louis in 1742, becoming a Commander of that order in 1754 and a Grand Croix in 1758. He was also made a knight of the Polish Order of the White Eagle in 1758. He died in Paris, aged 73, whilst governor of Givet and Charlemont.
