= Engelbert, 8th Duke of Arenberg =

Belgian nobleman and politician (1824–1975)

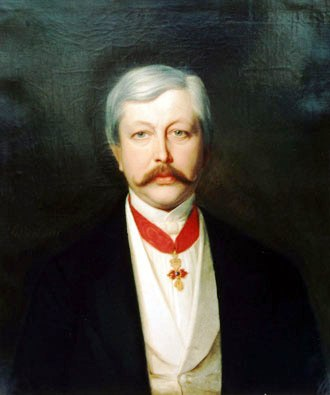
Engelbert August Anton, 8th Duke of Arenberg

Engelbert August Anton of Arenberg (Brussels, 11 May 1824 – Arenberg Castle, 28 March 1875) was 8th Duke of Arenberg and 14th Duke of Aarschot.

He was the son of Prosper Louis, 7th Duke of Arenberg, and belonged to one of the most important European noble families. He was Duke of Arenberg, Duke of Aarschot, Duke of Meppen and Prince of Recklinghausen.

In 1868, he married his second cousin Eleonore Ursula d'Arenberg (1845–1919). They had three daughters and two sons:

- Maria Ludmilla d'Arenberg, Princess and Duchess (1870–1953), married 1888 Carl Alfred Louis Rudolf von Croÿ, 12th Duke von Croÿ (1859–1906).
- Sophie Aloise d'Arenberg, Princess and Duchess (1871–1961), married 1889 Prince and Duke Jean Baptiste Engelbert d'Arenberg, (1850–1914).
- Engelbert Prosper Ernst Marie Joseph Jues Balthasar Benoit Antoine Eleonore Laurent d'Arenberg, 9th Duke d'Arenberg (1872–1949), married 1897 Princess Hedwige Marie Gabrielle de Ligne (1877–1938), daughter of Prince Charles Joseph Eugene Henri Georges Lamoral de Ligne.
- Marie Salvatrix d'Arenberg, Princess and Duchess (1874–1956), married 1896 Prince Auguste Marie Gustave Etienne Charles Emmanuel de Croÿ (1872–1932).
- Charles Prosper Maria Melchior Engelbert Eleonor Gregor Wolfgang Josef d'Arenberg, Prince and Duke (1875–1948), married 1919 (div. 1920), Emelie Marie Willner (born 1885). They divorced in 1920, and he married 2ndly, in 1923, Anka Baric (born 1893).

The Arenberg Foundation describe him as a great patron of the arts. He was the last Duke of Arenberg to hold possessions in Germany. These were lost in the German Unification. In 1861 he became a member of the Prussian House of Lords.
