= Maurice de Saxe =

Count of Saxony (1696–1750)

Marshal General Hermann Moritz von Sachsen (Maurice, comte de Saxe)
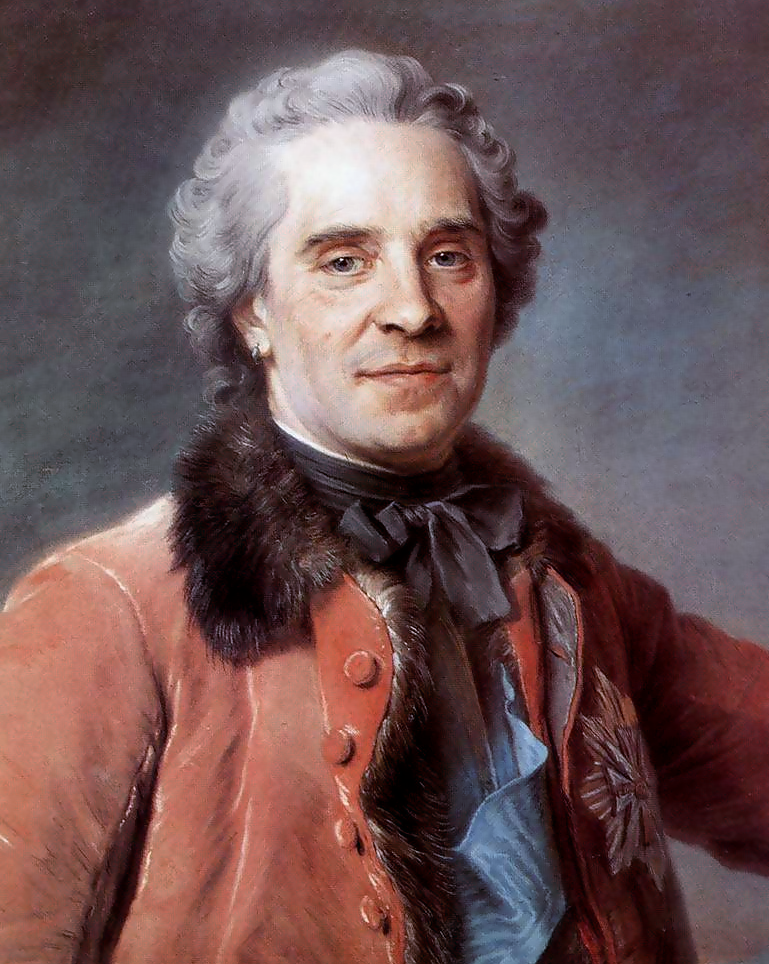
- Maurice de Saxe wearing the Polish Order of the White Eagle, 1748
- Born: 28 October 1696; Goslar, Holy Roman Empire
- Died: 20 November 1750 (aged 54); Château de Chambord, France
- Burial place: Saint Thomas Church, Strasbourg
- Spouse: Johanna Viktoria von Loeben
- Children: August Adolf von Sachsen; Marie-Aurore de Saxe
- Relatives: Augustus II the Strong (Father); Maria Aurora von Königsmarck (Mother)
- Military career
- Branch: Army of the Holy Roman Empire; French Royal Army
- Rank: Maréchal général des camps et armées du roi
- Conflicts: Great Northern War; Battle of Gadebusch; Austro-Turkish War (1716–1718); Siege of Belgrade (1717); War of the Austrian Succession; Battle of Prague (1741); Siege of Tournai (1745); Battle of Fontenoy; Siege of Brussels; Battle of Rocoux; Battle of Lauffeld; Siege of Maastricht (1748)

Coat of arms of Maurice de Saxe
- Coat of arms of Maurice de Saxe

Versions
- Arms as Marshal General of France
- Order: Order of the White Eagle (Poland)

Maurice de Saxe (Note: German: Hermann Moritz von Sachsen, French: Maurice, comte de Saxe) (28 October 1696 – 20 November 1750) was a prominent soldier, general and military theorist in the first half of the 18th century. The illegitimate son of Augustus II the Strong, he initially served in the Army of the Holy Roman Empire, then the Imperial Army, before entering French service.

Saxe was appointed first Marshal of France, then promoted further to Marshal General of France. He is best known for his victories in the 1740 to 1748 War of the Austrian Succession, particularly the Battle of Fontenoy.

== Childhood ==
Maurice was born at Goslar, an illegitimate son of Augustus II the Strong, King of Poland, Grand Duke of Lithuania and Elector of Saxony, and the Countess Maria Aurora von Königsmarck. He was the first of eight extramarital children whom August acknowledged, although as many as 354 are claimed by sources, including Wilhelmine of Bayreuth, to have existed.

In 1698, the Countess sent him to his father in Warsaw. Augustus had been elected King of Polish–Lithuanian Commonwealth in the previous year, but the unsettled condition of the country obliged Maurice to spend the greater part of his youth outside its borders. This separation from his father made him independent and had an important effect on his future career.

== Military career ==
At the age of twelve, Maurice served in the Imperial Army under Prince Eugene of Savoy, at the sieges of Tournai and Mons and at the Battle of Malplaquet during the War of the Spanish Succession. A proposal at the end of the campaign to send him to a Jesuit college in Brussels was dropped due to the protests of his mother.

Upon his return to the camp of the Allies at the beginning of 1710, Maurice displayed a courage so impetuous that Prince Eugene admonished him to not confuse rashness with valour.

He next served under Peter the Great against the Swedes in the Great Northern War. In 1711, Augustus formally recognized him and Maurice was granted the rank of Count (Graf). He then accompanied his father to Pomerania, and in 1712 he took part in the Battle of Gadebusch. At the age of 17 in 1713 he commanded his own regiment of the Royal Saxon Army.

As an adult, Maurice bore a strong resemblance to his father, both physically and in character. His grasp was so powerful that he could bend a horseshoe with his hand, and even at the end of his life, his energy and endurance were scarcely affected by the illnesses his many excesses had caused.

On 12 March 1714, a marriage was arranged between him and one of the richest of his father's subjects, Countess Johanna Viktoria Tugendreich von Loeben, but he dissipated her fortune so rapidly that he was soon heavily in debt. The next year (21 January 1715), Johanna gave birth to a son, called August Adolf after his grandfather; the child only lived a few hours. Since Maurice had also given her more serious grounds of complaint against him, he consented to an annulment of the marriage on 21 March 1721.

After serving Charles VI, Holy Roman Emperor in a campaign against the Ottoman Empire in 1717, he went to Paris to study mathematics, and in 1720 obtained a commission as Maréchal de camp. In 1725, he entered negotiations for election as Duke of Courland, at the insistence of the Duchess Anna Ivanovna, who offered him her hand. He was chosen duke in 1726, but declined marriage with the duchess. He soon found it impossible to resist her opposition to his claims, but with the assistance of £30,000 lent him by the French actress Adrienne Lecouvreur, he raised a force by which he maintained his authority till 1727, when he withdrew and took up residence in Paris. Lecouvreur was to die mysteriously shortly afterwards: there is controversy as to whether or not she was poisoned by her rival, Louise Henriette Françoise de Lorraine, Duchess of Bouillon.

At the outbreak of the War of the Polish Succession, Maurice served under James FitzJames, 1st Duke of Berwick, and for a successful manoeuvre at the Siege of Philippsburg he was named lieutenant-general. In the War of the Austrian Succession he took command of an army division sent to invade Austria in 1741, and on 19 November 1741, surprised Prague during the night, and seized it before the garrison was aware of the presence of an enemy, a coup de main which made him famous throughout Europe; he thus repeated the exploit of 1648 of his maternal great-grandfather, Hans Christoff von Königsmarck. After capturing the fortress of Eger (Cheb) on 19 April 1742, he received a leave of absence, and went to Russia to push his claims for the Duchy of Courland, but returned to his command after getting nowhere.

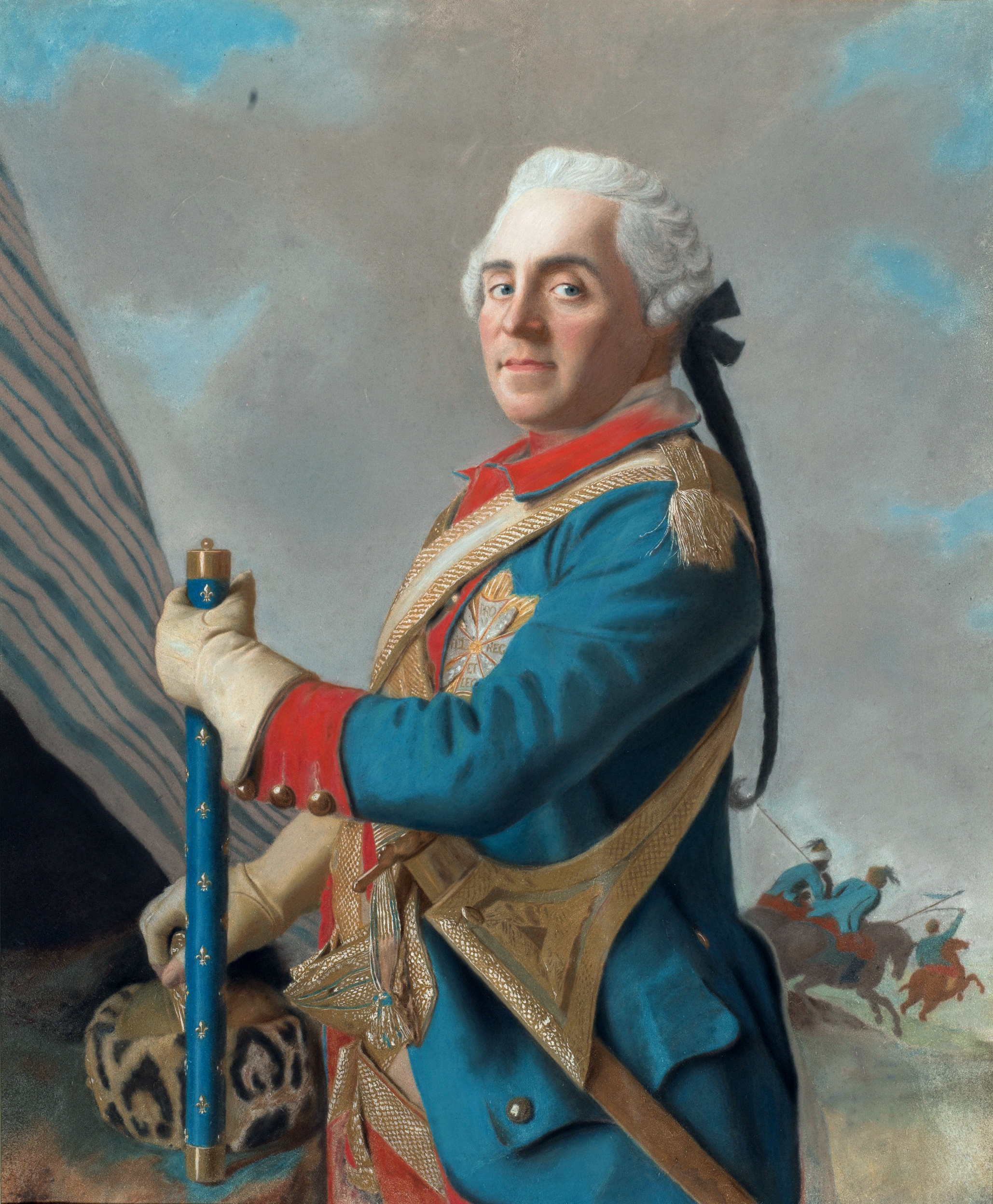
Maurice de Saxe as a Marshal of France by Jean-Étienne Liotard

Maurice's exploits were the sole redeeming feature in an unsuccessful campaign, and on 26 March 1743, his merits were rewarded by promotion to Marshal of France. He had been given only 50–60,000 men to defend against an enemy army twice as large. From this time on, he became one of the great generals of the age. In 1744, he was chosen to command the 10,000 men of the French invasion of Britain on behalf of James Francis Edward Stuart, which assembled at Dunkirk but did not proceed more than a few miles out of harbour before being wrecked by disastrous storms. After its termination, he received an independent command in the Austrian Netherlands, and by skilful manoeuvring succeeded in continually harassing the superior forces of the enemy without risking a decisive battle.

In the following year, Maurice with 65,000 men besieged Tournai and inflicted a severe defeat on the army of the Duke of Cumberland at the Battle of Fontenoy, an encounter determined entirely by his constancy and cool leadership. During the battle, he was unable to sit on horseback due to edema, and was carried about in a wicker chariot.

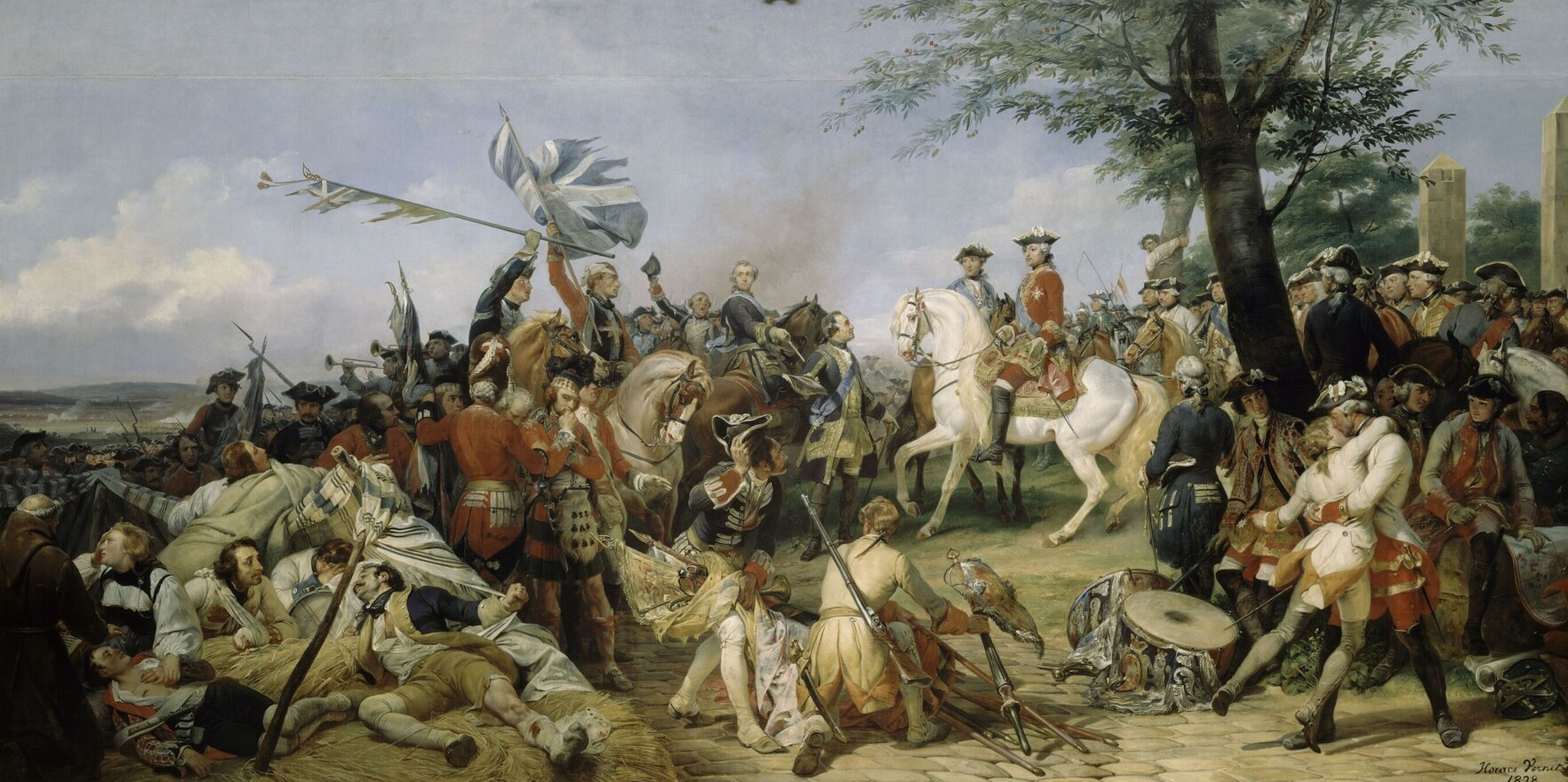
The Battle of Fontenoy, 11 May 1745, showing Maurice de Saxe presenting the captured British and Dutch prisoners and colours to Louis XV and the Dauphin

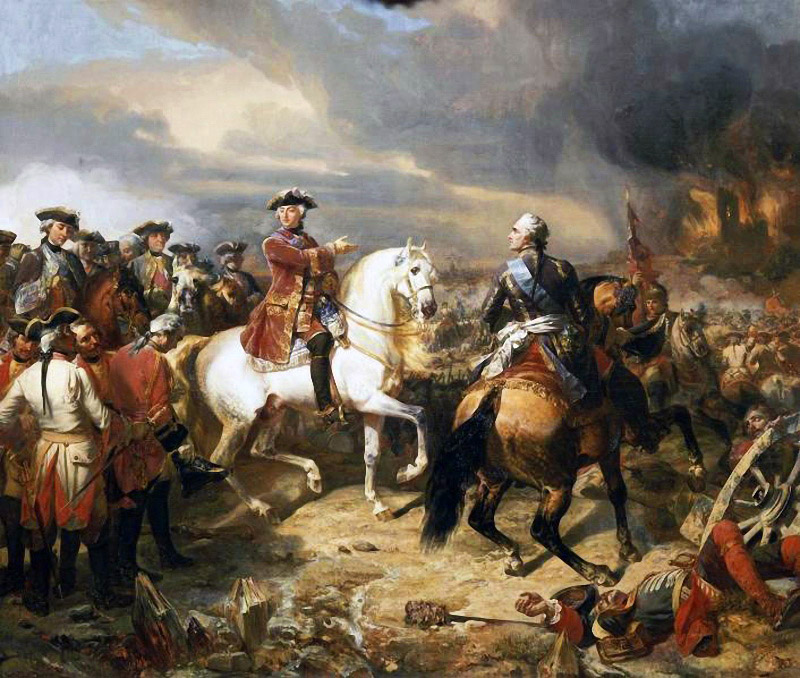
The Battle of Lauffeld by Auguste Couder, 1836. 2 July 1747: Louis XV pointing out the village of Lawfeld to Maurice

In recognition of his achievement, Louis XV conferred on him the Château de Chambord for life, and in April 1746, he was naturalised as a French subject. Until the end of the war, he continued to command in the Netherlands, always with success. Besides Fontenoy he added Rocoux (1746) and Lawfeldt or Val (1747) to the list of French victories. He led the French force which captured Brussels and it was under his orders that Marshal Löwendahl captured Bergen op Zoom. He himself won the last success of the war in capturing Maastricht in 1748.

Saxe invented a handheld light-artillery piece that he called an amusette, which fired a half-pound ball a distance of 4,000 paces at a rate of 100 shots an hour.

In 1747 the title once held by Turenne and Villars, "Marshal General of the King's camps and armies", was revived for Maurice. But on 20 November 1750 he died at the Château de Chambord "of a putrid fever".

During the last years of his life, Maurice had an affair with a French lady, Marie Rinteau, who at that time was only eighteen years old. In 1748 she gave birth to a daughter, the last of Maurice's several illegitimate children. She was called Maria Aurora (in French: Marie Aurore) after her grandmother. She bore the surname de la Rivière until 1766 when the Parlement of Paris formally recognized her parentage and she could assume the surname of von Sachsen or de Saxe. Marie Aurore married firstly in 1766 with Antoine, Count of Horne (1735–1767), an alleged illegitimate son of Louis XV. By her second marriage with Louis Claude Dupin de Francueil (in 1777), she was the grandmother of Amandine Lucile Aurore Dupin, who later became famous as the writer George Sand. Maria Aurore died on 25 December 1821 when her granddaughter George Sand was seventeen. Sand included details of her grandmother's parentage in her memoirs.

== Writings ==
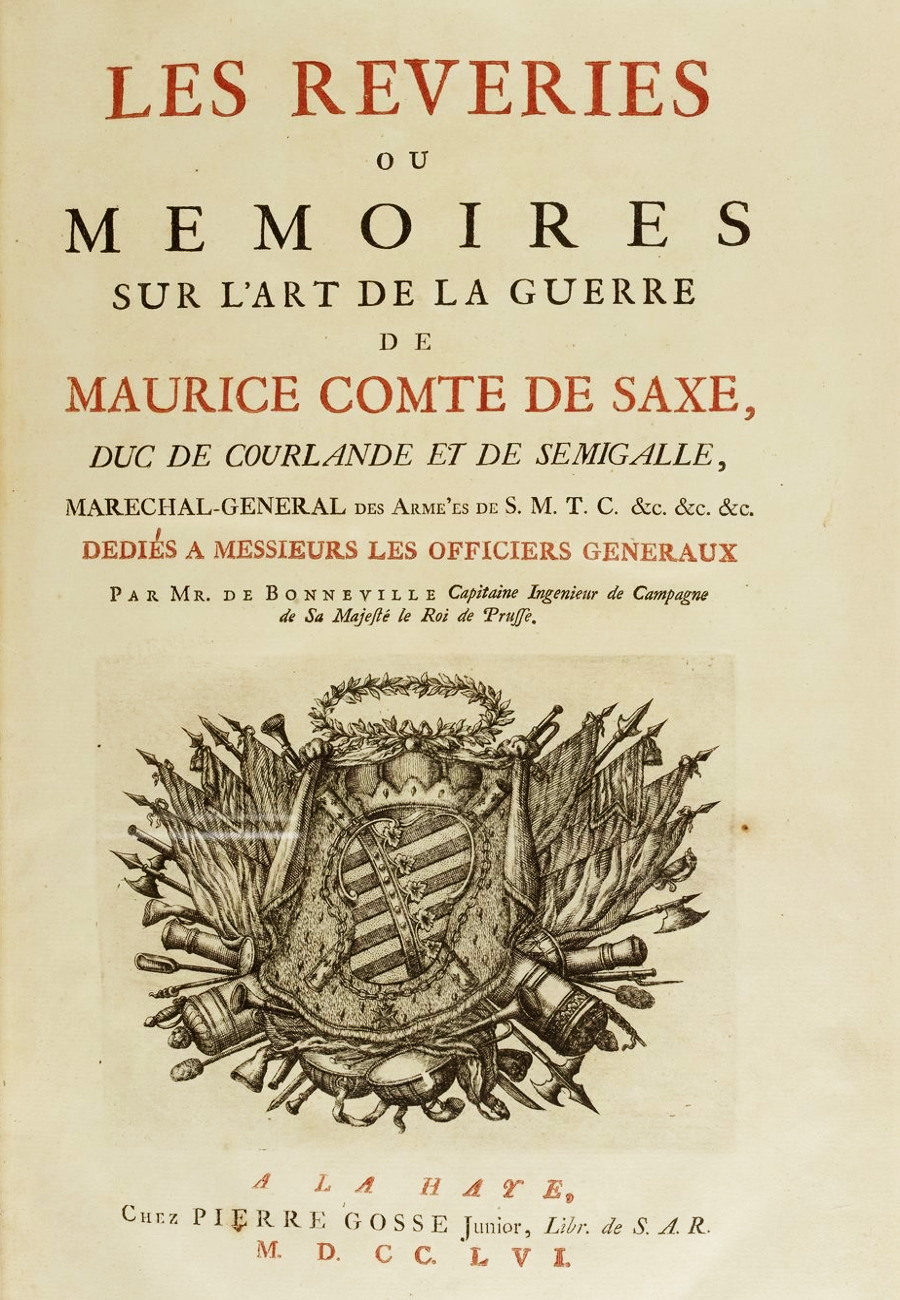
Title page of Les Rêveries, ou Mémoires sur l’art de la guerre

Saxe's work on the art of war, Mes Rêveries (My Reveries), was published after his death in 1756. Described by Carlyle as "a strange military farrago, dictated, as I should think, under opium", it was praised by Frederick the Great and described by Lord Montgomery, more than two centuries later, as "a remarkable work on the art of war".

A common theme of the 18th century Age of Enlightenment was to emphasise the scientific method and the idea every activity could be expressed in terms of a universal system. In one sense, Mes Rêveries followed this by subjecting "military affairs to reasoned criticism and intellectual treatment, and the ensuing military doctrines were perceived as forming a definitive system". Written following Prussian expansion during the War of the Austrian Succession, Saxe rejected their rigid discipline; arguing the French character was fundamentally different and their tactics should reflect that, he advocated the use of a deep order or ordre profond, rather than relying on firearms.

However, Mes Rêveries also challenged French military orthodoxy in arguing for a greater focus on mobile warfare, rather than fortifications; this was partly a legacy of Vauban (1633–1707), who had revolutionised this field but adherence to his principles meant French engineers became ultra-conservative. As early as 1701, John Churchill, 1st Duke of Marlborough argued winning one battle was more beneficial than taking 12 fortresses; Saxe followed this line but his argument was given increased weight by French losses in the 1756–1763 Seven Years' War.

Saxe's Lettres et mémoires choisis (Selected Letters and Memoirs) appeared in 1794. His letters to his sister Anna Karolina Orzelska, the Duchess of Schleswig-Holstein-Sonderburg-Beck, preserved at Strasbourg, were destroyed by the bombardment of that place in 1870. Thirty copies had, however, been printed from the original.

== Legacy ==
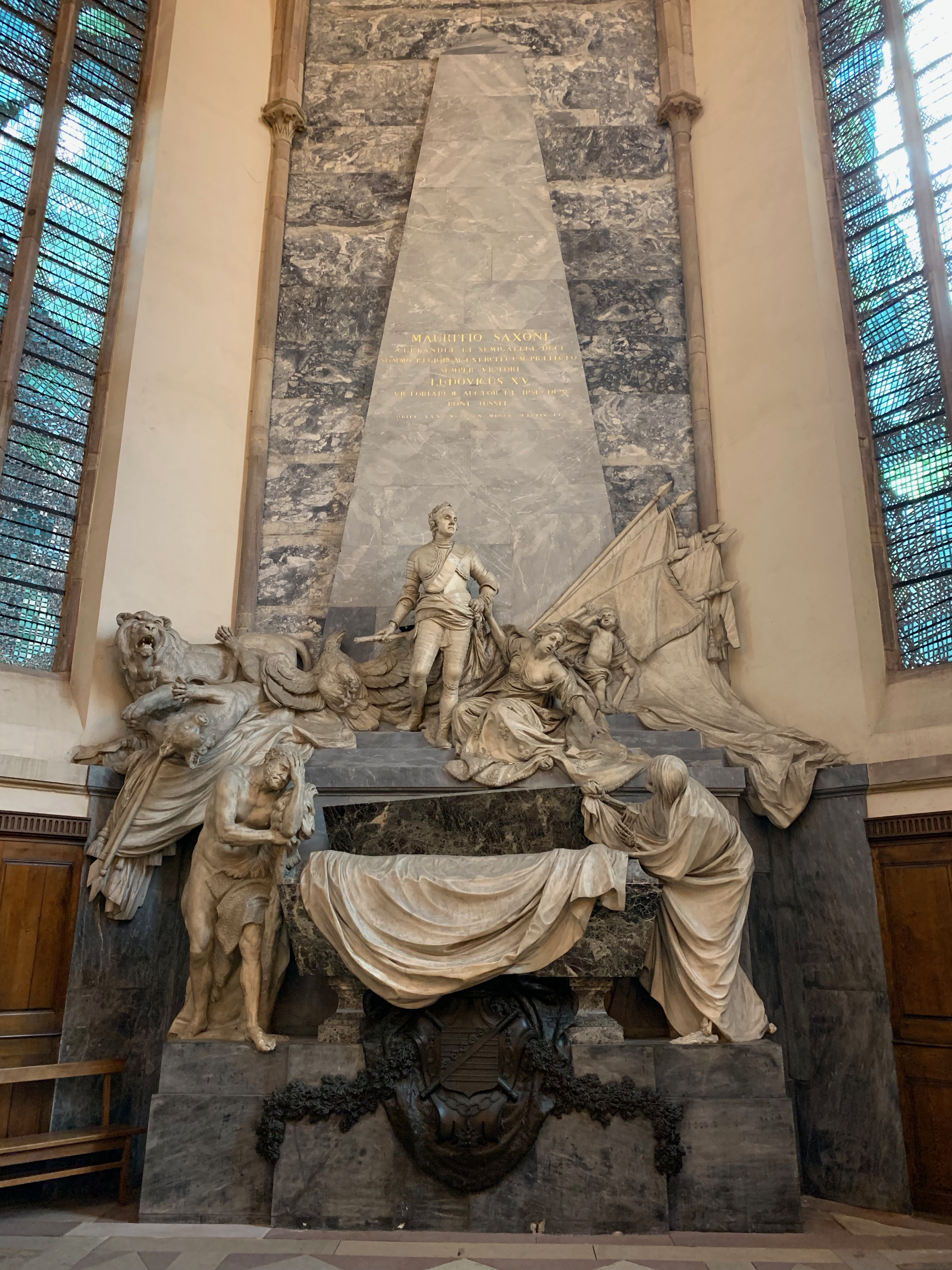
Funerary monument of Maurice de Saxe in Saint Thomas Church, Strasbourg

After Maurice de Saxe's death in Chambord, a funerary ceremony was held for him in Paris, but as a Protestant, he could not be buried there. His remains were transported to Strasbourg and temporarily kept at the Temple Neuf. At Louis XV's request, a permanent mausoleum was created by Jean-Baptiste Pigalle in the apse of St Thomas' Church, Strasbourg, of which it now marks the focal point. The elaborate monument, under which de Saxe's remains were interred on 20 August 1777, shows Death holding a sandglass and calling him to the grave while a crying France tries to retain him, and Hercules weeps on the tomb's side. To the left are France's enemies personnified by three distraught animals: the German eagle, the Dutch lion, and the British lion, and their broken flags, while to the right are France's triumphant standards. In the middle stands the heroic marshal holding his baton, unfazed by his fate. Gérard de Nerval believed his majestic pose might have inspired the Commendatore's statue in Don Giovanni, based on the fact that Mozart had performed in the church in 1778 shortly after the monument's inauguration.

Maurice de Saxe has been the focus of several biographical works. Many previous errors in former biographies were corrected and additional information supplied in Karl von Weber's Moritz Graf von Sachsen, Marschall von Frankreich, nach archivalischen Quellen [Moritz Count of Saxony, Marshal of France, according to archival sources] (Leipzig: Tauchnitz, 1863), in Saint-René Taillandier's Maurice de Saxe, étude historique d'après les documents des archives de Dresde [Maurice of Saxe, historical study according to the documents in the archives of Dresden] (1865) and in Karl Friedrich Vitzthum von Eckstädt Maurice de Saxe (Leipzig, 1861).

A biography in English is Jon Manchip White's Marshal of France: The Life and Times of Maurice, Comte de Saxe (1696–1750) (Rand McNally & Company, Chicago, 1962). See also the military histories of the period, especially Carlyle's Frederick the Great.

He is honoured in the Walhalla Memorial.

== Ancestry ==
Ancestors of Maurice de Saxe

8. John George II, Elector of Saxony
4. John George III, Elector of Saxony
8. Magdalene Sibylle of Brandenburg-Bayreuth
2. Augustus II the Strong
10. Frederick III of Denmark
5. Princess Anna Sophie of Denmark
11. Sophie Amalie of Brunswick-Lüneburg
1. Maurice de Saxe
12. Count Hans Christoff von Königsmarck
6. Count Kurt Christoph von Königsmarck
13. Barbara Maria Agata von Leesten
3. Countess Maria Aurora von Königsmarck
14. Herman Wrangel
7. Maria Kristina Wrangel
15. Countess Amalie Magdalena of Nassau-Siegen
