= Ham-sur-Heure-Nalinnes =

Municipality in Hainaut Province, Wallonia, Belgium

Ham-sur-Heure-Nalinnes: Han-so-Eure-Nålene (Walloon)
- Municipality
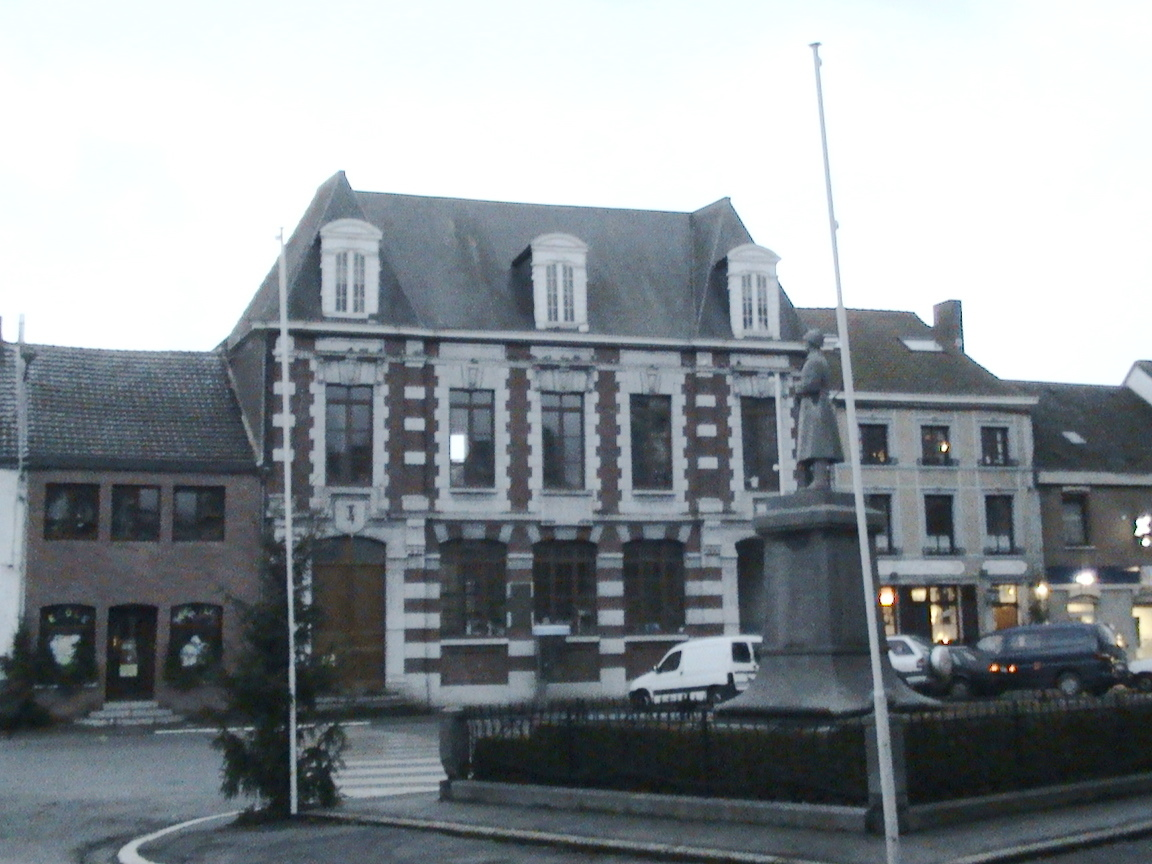

- Flag Coat of arms

- Location of Ham-sur-Heure-Nalinnes in Hainaut
- Interactive map of Ham-sur-Heure-Nalinnes
- Location in Belgium
- Coordinates: 50°19′N 04°23′E
- Country: Belgium
- Community: French Community
- Region: Wallonia
- Province: Hainaut
- Arrondissement: Thuin

Government
  - Mayor: Yves Binon (MR)
  - Governing parties: MR, CDH

Area
  - Total: 45.71 km^{2} (17.65 sq mi)

Population (2026-01-01)
  - Total: 13,856
  - Density: 303.1/km^{2} (785.1/sq mi)
- Postal codes: 6120
- NIS code: 56086
- Area codes: 071
- Website: www.ham-sur-heure-nalinnes.be

Ham-sur-Heure-Nalinnes (French pronunciation: [am syʁ œʁ nalin]; Walloon: Han-so-Eure-Nålene) is a municipality of Wallonia located in the province of Hainaut, Belgium.

On January 1, 2026, Ham-sur-Heure-Nalinnes had a total population of 13,856. The land area is 45.68 km^{2} (18 sq mi), which gives a population density of 303 inhabitants per km^{2}

The municipality consists of the following districts: Cour-sur-Heure (Walloon: Cour), Ham-sur-Heure (Han-so-Eure), Jamioulx (Djanmioû), Marbaix-la-Tour (Marbwê) and Nalinnes (Nålene).

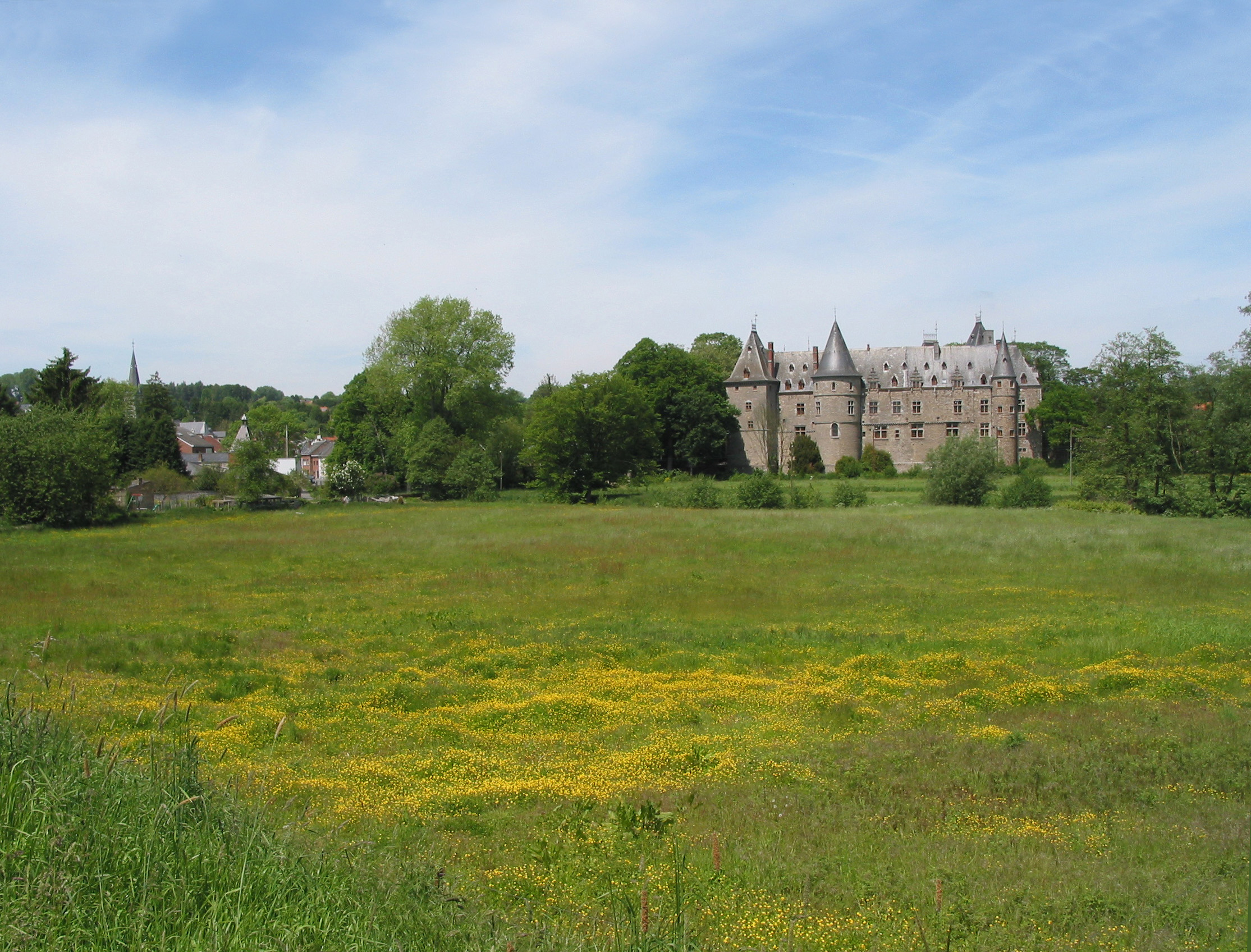
Ham-sur-Heure Castle
