= D'Arenberg (disambiguation) =

d'Arenberg may refer to:

- Family name of the House of Arenberg, princes and dukes of Arenberg, mostly based in modern Belgium
  - Auguste-Louis-Albéric, prince d'Arenberg (1837–1924) was a French noble and monarchist politician. Third son of Pierre d'Alcantara Charles Marie, duc d'Arenberg.
  - Philippe Charles d'Arenberg, 3rd Duke of Arenberg and Duke of Arschot (1663 - 1691)
- d'Arenberg, an Australian wine company founded in 1912.
- Prix d'Arenberg, a group 3 flat horse race in France for two-year-old thoroughbreds. It is run over a distance of 1,100 metres (approximately 5½ furlongs) in September, currently at Chantilly Racecourse.
- Arenberg, duchy in Germany
- The Trouée d'Arenberg or Tranchée de Wallers-Arenberg (English: Trench of Arenberg) is a 2.4km long cobbled road in the municipality of Wallers in Northern France.
