= Arenberg Pit =

French coal mine

Auguste d’Arenberg Pit
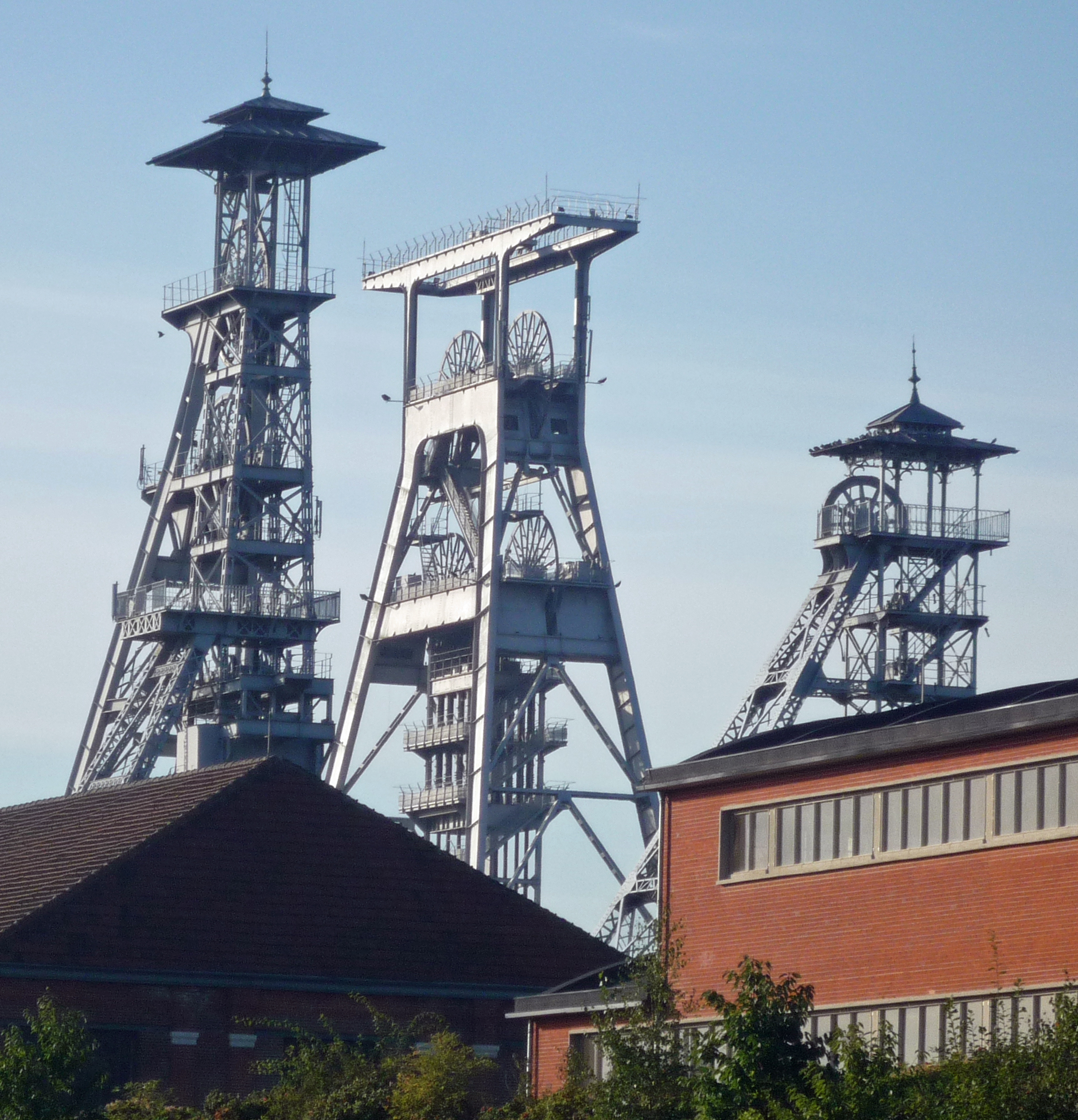
- The three headframes of the Arenberg pit.

- Location within France
- Location: Wallers Nord Hauts-de-France; 50.384853°N 3.425181°E
- Products: Bituminous coal
- Opened: 1900
- Closed: 1989
- Company: Anzin Mining Company
- Listed as a historic monument (2009); Historic monument Classified as a historic monument (2010); World Heritage Site (2012) (Note: The surface installations of the mine are classified as a Monument historique, while the community hall and the domestic science school are listed individually. The UNESCO World Heritage inscription covers the Arenberg pit, spoil heap no. 171, the Mare à Goriaux pond, the church in the Arenberg estate, the schools of the Arenberg, Nouveau Monde, and Bosquet estates, the Arenberg estate community hall, its domestic science school, and the medical health center.)

The Arenberg Pit (also known as the Auguste d’Arenberg Pit) of the Compagnie des mines d’Anzin is a former coal mine located in Wallers, in the Nord–Pas-de-Calais mining basin. Shafts Arenberg Nos. 1 and 2 were started in 1900 in the northeastern part of the commune, within an unexploited area of the Anzin concession. Shaft No. 1 served for extraction and Shaft No. 2 for ventilation. Coal extraction began in June 1903, and the site was named after Auguste Louis Albéric d’Arenberg, an administrator of the Compagnie des mines d’Anzin. The mine soon became one of the company’s major production sites. Residential areas with schools, a domestic science school, a church, and a community hall were built nearby. In 1936, Shaft No. 1 received a new headframe, replacing the older structure, and the conical spoil tip No. 160, known as Arenberg, increased in size.

The Compagnie des mines d’Anzin was nationalized in 1946 and incorporated into the Valenciennes Group. The Arenberg Pit was designated as one of the principal concentration sites in the mining basin. To support this development, the double-compartment Shaft No. 3–4 was started in 1954 and equipped with modern facilities, including a washing plant built to the west of the site. The new shaft entered service on August 28, 1961, and waste materials were deposited on the flat spoil tip No. 171, Mare à Goriaux. The oil crisis extended the pit’s operation for several years. In 1980, exploitation of the conical spoil tip No. 160 began, and on January 9, 1984, a tunneling machine was commissioned to drive galleries and conduct tests in preparation for the Channel Tunnel project. Coal extraction ended in March 1989. The site’s installations were subsequently preserved, notably due to the filming of Germinal in 1992, which contributed to its protection and heritage recognition.

In the early 21st century, Charbonnages de France identified the locations of Shafts Nos. 1, 2, and 3–4 and installed firedamp outlets on the site. The community hall and the domestic science school were listed as historical monuments in December 2009, and the Arenberg Pit itself was classified on February 22, 2010, following its complete renovation. On June 30, 2012, the Arenberg Pit, along with several associated sites—including the Bellaing pavilion housing estate, the Arenberg miners’ housing estate, the community hall, the domestic science school, Sainte-Barbe Church, the school, the mining relief society dispensary, the Nouveau Monde pavilion estate and its school, the modern housing estates of La Drève and Le Bosquet, the Bosquet estate school, the Mare à Goriaux and its flat spoil tip No. 171, as well as the pit’s railway branch—was inscribed on the UNESCO World Heritage List as part of the Nord–Pas-de-Calais mining basin. In September 2015, the “Arenberg Creative Mine,” a film and audiovisual production center, was inaugurated on the site.

== Pit ==
After the commissioning of the Audiffret-Pasquier, La Grange, Blignières, and Cuvinot pits beginning in the 1880s, the Compagnie des mines d’Anzin decided to establish a new mining site in the northern, still unexploited part of its concession. The Arenberg Pit was subsequently opened in the commune of Wallers, on the opposite side of the territory from the Lambrecht Pit.

=== Sinking ===
Shafts Nos. 1 and 2 of the Arenberg Pit were sunk in 1900 using the cutting-shoe method. Shaft No. 1, with a diameter of five meters, was designated for extraction, while Shaft No. 2, located 60 meters to the northwest (Note: Distances were measured using Google Earth, with mine shaft distances calculated from center to center and rounded to the nearest ten meters. Marked shaft heads enable the identification of shafts on aerial images.) and measuring 3.65 meters in diameter, served for ventilation. The openings of both shafts were positioned at an altitude of 38 meters. (Note: Gosselet 1913, p. 158) Coal-bearing strata were encountered at depths of 130 meters in the first shaft and 134 meters in the second.

The pit was named after Auguste Louis Albéric d’Arenberg, administrator of the Compagnie des mines d’Anzin.

=== Operation ===
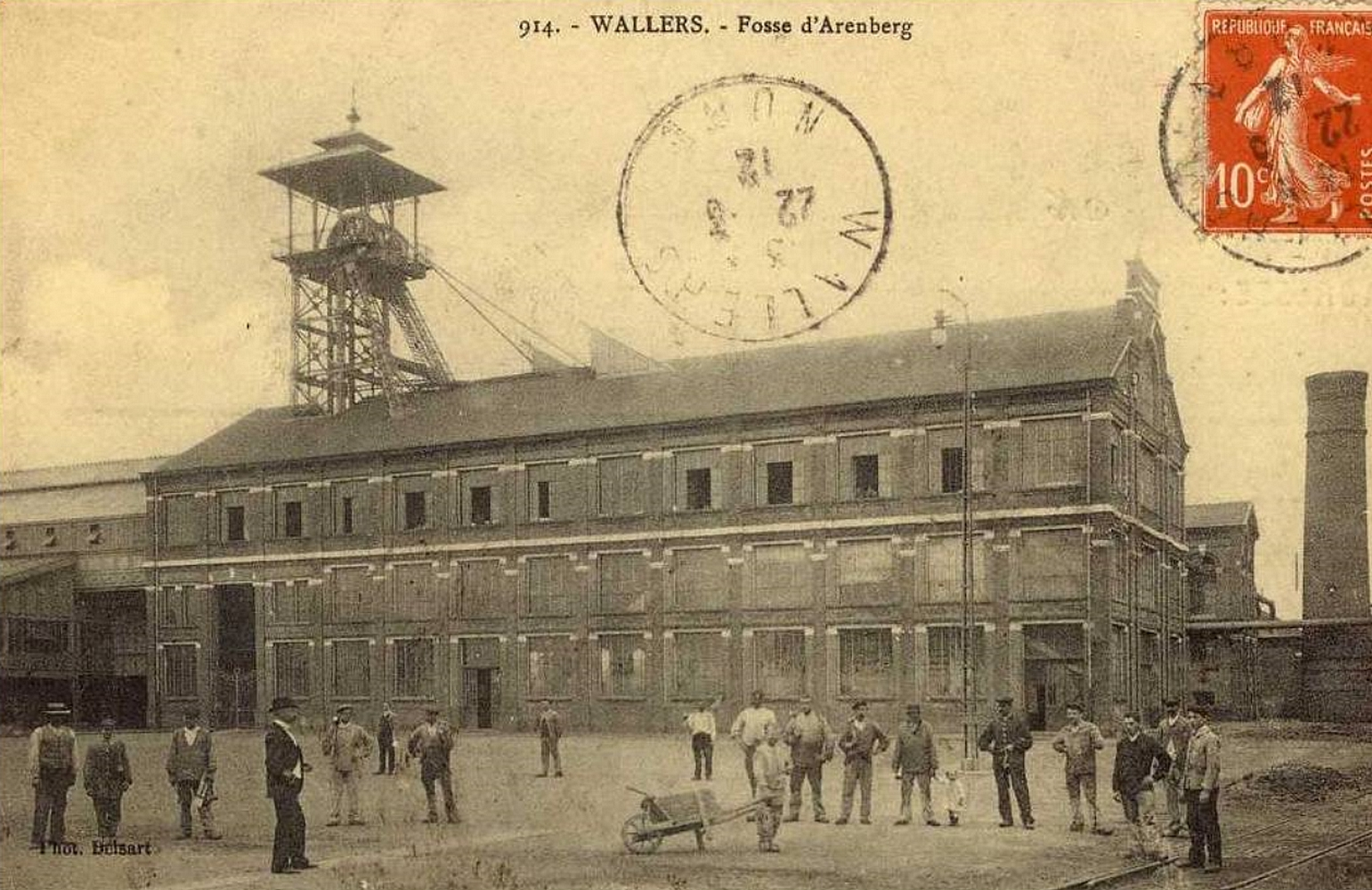
Well No. 1 around 1912.

Coal extraction at the Arenberg Pit began in June 1903. The site soon became one of the principal operations of the Compagnie des mines d’Anzin, producing 218,915 tons of coal in 1906, 302,000 tons in 1925, and 452,630 tons in 1930.

In 1936, the facilities of Shaft No. 1 were modernized. A new headframe with superimposed pulleys replaced the original structure, and a new engine room was constructed at a right angle to the previous one. The updated extraction system employed a Koepe pulley mechanism.

=== Concentration site ===
The Compagnie des mines d’Anzin was nationalized in 1946 and integrated into the Valenciennes Group. At that time, coal extraction and operations were conducted through Shaft No. 1, while Shaft No. 2 was used for ventilation and service functions. Following nationalization, plans were made to develop the site into a major extraction facility, leading to the sinking of Shaft No. 3–4 in 1954. This new shaft, with a diameter of 6.50 meters and double compartments, reached an extraction level of 334 meters. It was equipped with a four-pulley portal headframe identical to that of Pit No. 13–13 bis of the Béthune Group. From August 28, 1961, extraction was carried out using four three-deck cages designed to transport 3,000-liter mine cars. The compartments, numbered 3 and 4, operated independently.

Shaft No. 1 was subsequently repurposed as a service shaft for personnel and equipment, while Shaft No. 2 was used for backfilling, with calibrated shale lowered through a pipeline. Both Shafts Nos. 1 and 2 functioned as return-air shafts. A modern coal washing plant, capable of processing 3,000 tons of clean coal per day, was also commissioned in 1961, coinciding with the operation of Shaft No. 3–4.

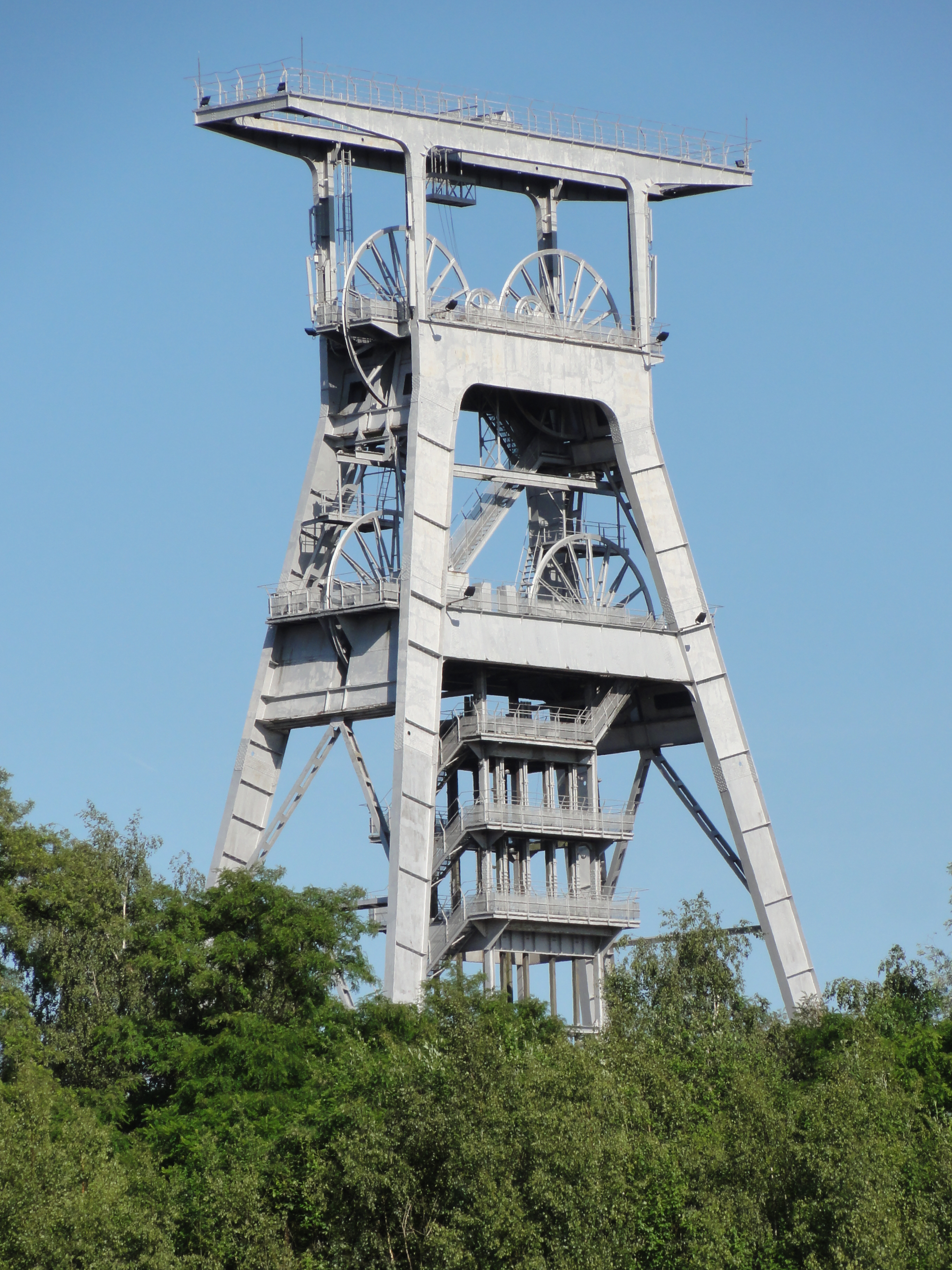
Well No. 3-4 in 2011.

The Arenberg site reached the highest production level in the Valenciennes Group, producing 3,000 tons of clean coal per day. In 1964, it employed 1,787 underground workers and 215 surface workers. In 1969, Shaft No. 1 was fitted with cable guidance and adapted for the movement of 3,000-liter mine cars, enabling shuttle transport between the 314- and 578-meter levels. It was subsequently used as a service shaft and ceased coal extraction to the surface.

On July 1, 1973, the Arenberg Pit was integrated into the Douai Production Unit. The 1975 energy crisis and the increase in oil prices led to a revision of the Coal Plan, which had initially planned the site’s closure for around 1979 or 1980. Shaft No. 3–4, connected at the 494-meter level for compartment No. 3 and originally measuring 4.12 meters in diameter down to the 578-meter level, was widened to 6.50 meters and deepened to 612 meters in October 1975. The first coal from a panel of the Melchior seam was extracted from this level on December 27, 1977. The washing plant was closed on July 1, 1975, after processing twenty million tons of raw coal from the Arenberg Pit, as well as from the Saint Mark and Agache pits between 1968 and 1972.

In 1982, plans were made to deepen Shaft No. 3–4 to 670 meters in order to access an additional two million tons of coal reserves. A descending gallery with a 13% slope was excavated from the 578-meter level to the new depth, extending the shaft by 90 meters. For the first time in a French mine, the excavation work was carried out using a tunnel-boring machine (TBM). The TB 500 model, designed by the Bouygues company, was delivered in sections in September 1983 and began operating on January 9, 1984. Intended to excavate three kilometers of galleries to reach the deposit, the machine achieved an average rate of twelve meters per day by April, surpassing its initial target of ten. Compartments Nos. 3 and 4 were connected to the 670-meter level on August 2 and 3, 1986, and a scraper-chain coalface was established shortly afterward in the Robert 1er plat seam. The project also served as a technical test for future use of tunnel-boring machines in the Channel Tunnel.

On March 24, 1989, at 11 a.m., a ceremony attended by the press and regional officials marked the symbolic hoisting of the final mine carts. The last actual extraction took place a week later, on March 31, behind closed doors. This event marked the closure of the last operational shaft in the Valenciennes coalfield, which had produced a total of 31,845,000 tons of coal. All four shafts were backfilled by mid-1989.

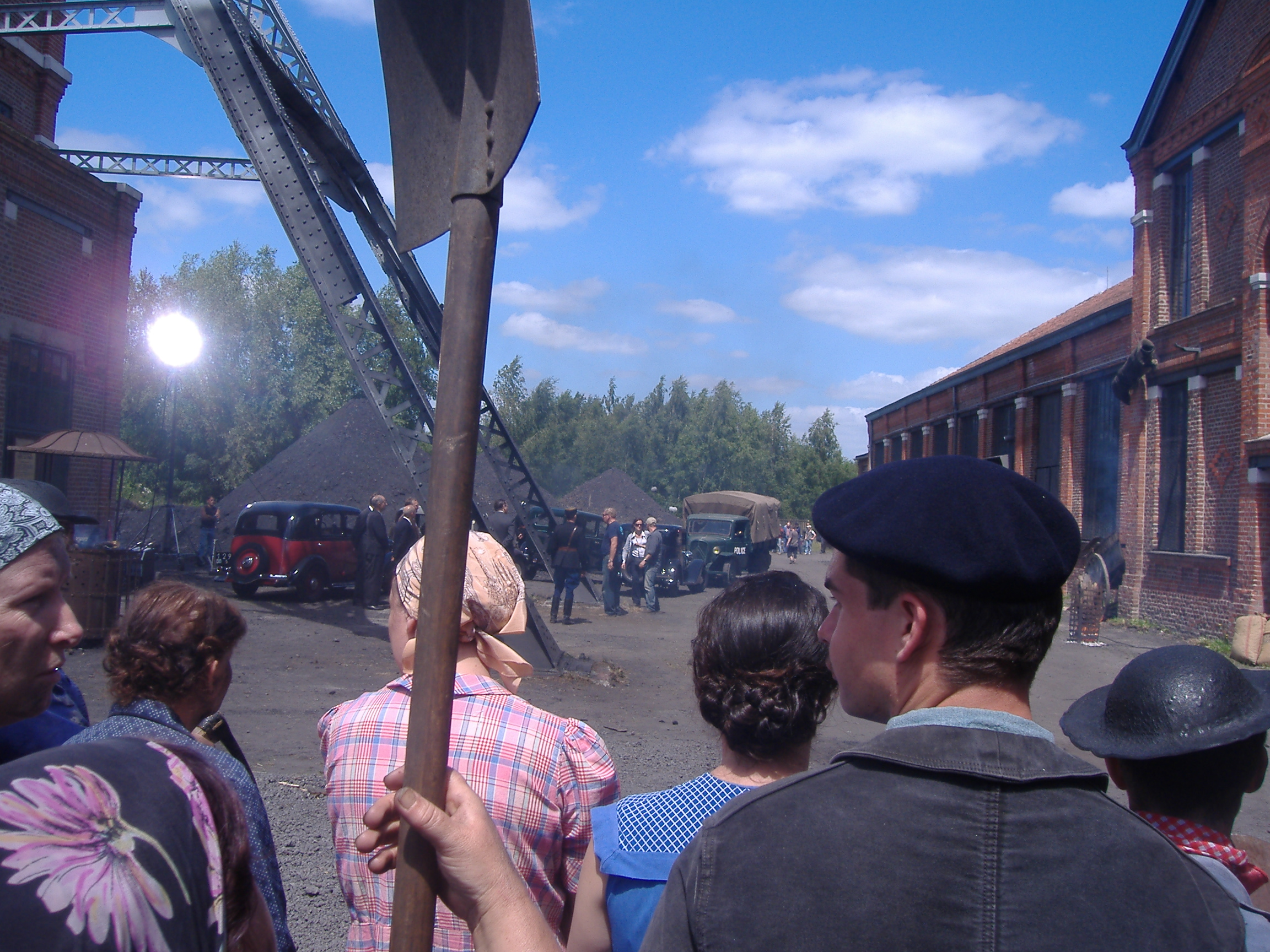
Filming of scenes for the television movie L'Affaire Salengro on June 26, 2008.

=== Redevelopment ===
In the early 21st century, Charbonnages de France identified and marked the heads of Arenberg Shafts Nos. 1, 2, and 3–4, where methane vents were installed. The French Geological and Mining Research Bureau (BRGM) conducts annual inspections at the site.

The pit, largely preserved, has been used as a filming location for several productions, including Germinal, Moi, Louis, enfant de la mine, La Compagnie des glaces, L’Affaire Salengro, and La Vie devant elles. The site was fully renovated, and its preservation was largely due to the 1992 filming of Germinal by Claude Berri, which prevented its planned demolition. Some of the film sets from these productions remain in place.

The musical Arenberg, written by Vincent Handrey and commissioned by the town of Wallers and the Porte du Hainaut Urban Community, was presented on September 12 and 13, 2003, at the Arenberg mining site. The production, featuring around 120 participants, was staged and directed by Sylvie Dervaux as an adaptation of the Terres de Mineurs show into a sound-and-light performance.

The former Arenberg mining site, including Shaft No. 1 with its headframe, hoisting houses, and technical equipment; Shaft No. 2 with its headframe, surface structures, hoisting and compressor buildings, workshops, ventilation system remains, and the air gallery connecting Shafts 1 and 2; and Shaft No. 3–4 with its headframe, hoisting house, winding system, and symmetrical hoisting-engine buildings, was listed as a Monument historique on February 22, 2010. The designation also covers auxiliary buildings such as the changing rooms (salle des pendus), lamp room, baths, connecting walkway, electrical substation, and the surrounding land, with the exception of the dynamite store. Initial protective measures were introduced in 1992, and the protected perimeter was expanded in 2010. The Arenberg Pit is one of 353 elements across 109 sites inscribed on the UNESCO World Heritage List on June 30, 2012, as part of site No. 15.

On September 25, 2015, the Arenberg Creative Mine film production center was inaugurated. The facility includes a recording studio, a television set, and a motion-capture system with a green screen. It occupies the restored buildings of Shafts Nos. 1 and 2, complemented by a modern extension.

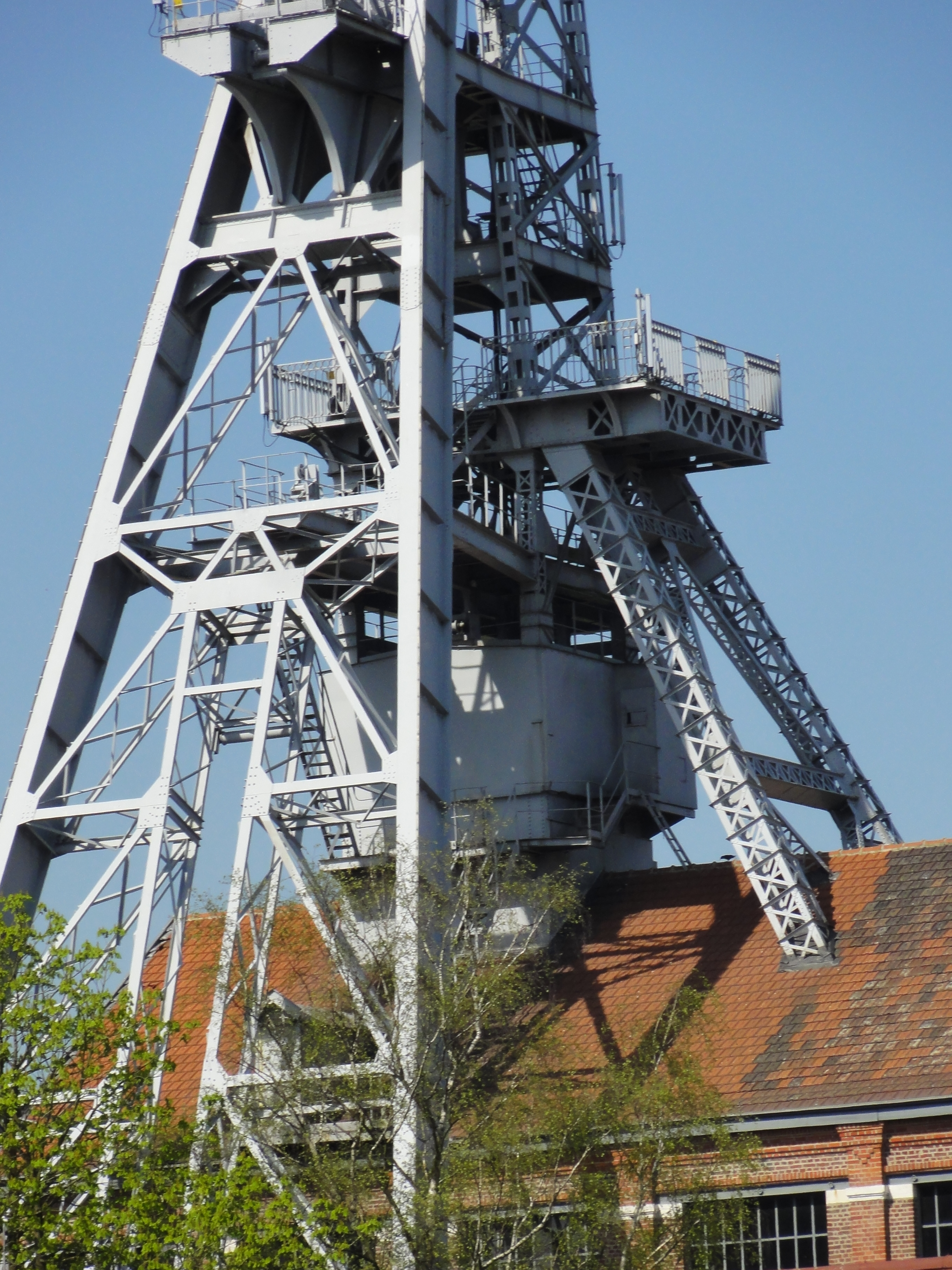
The headframes of shaft No. 1, the old and the new.

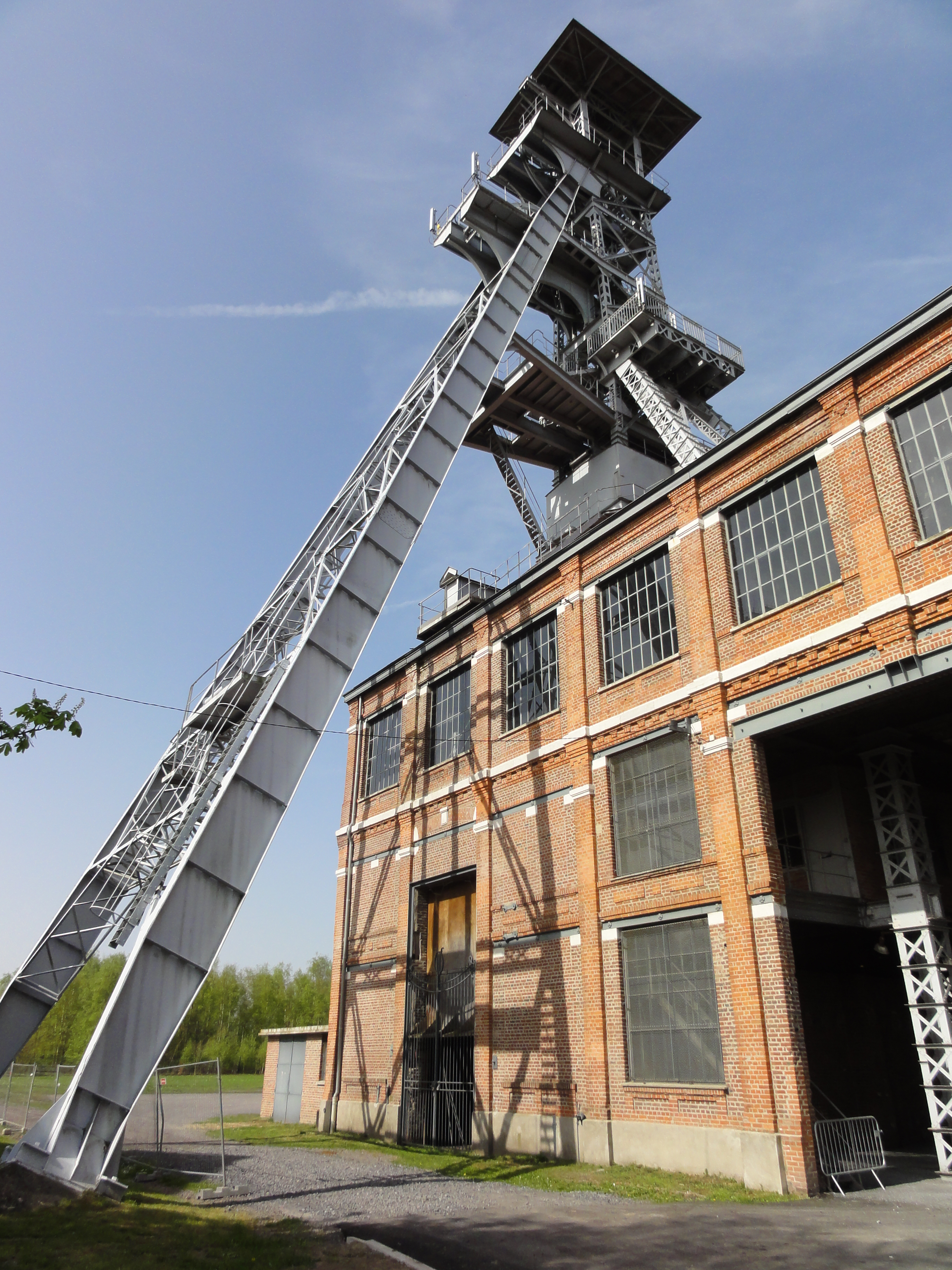
Shaft No. 1.

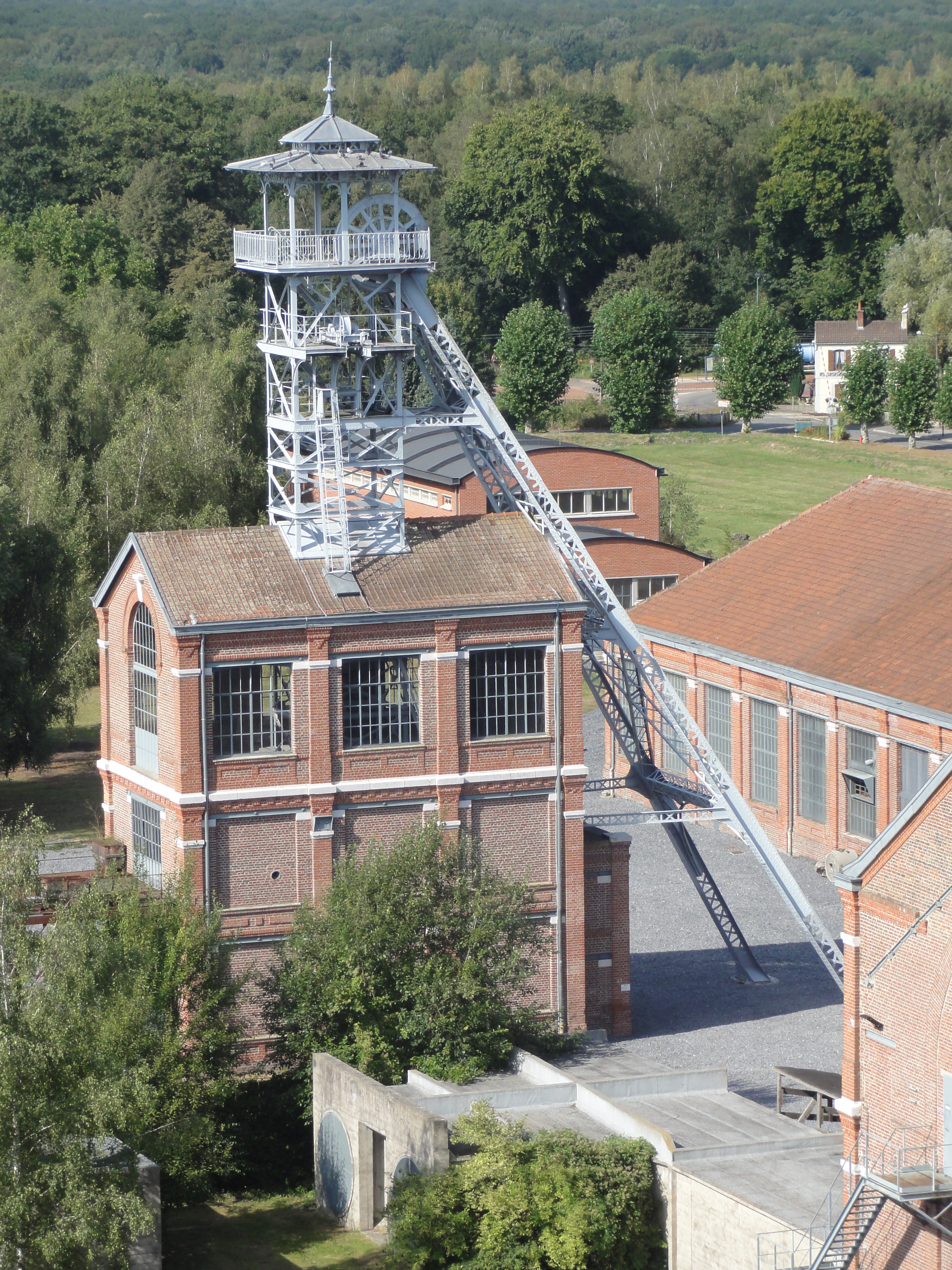
Shaft No. 2.

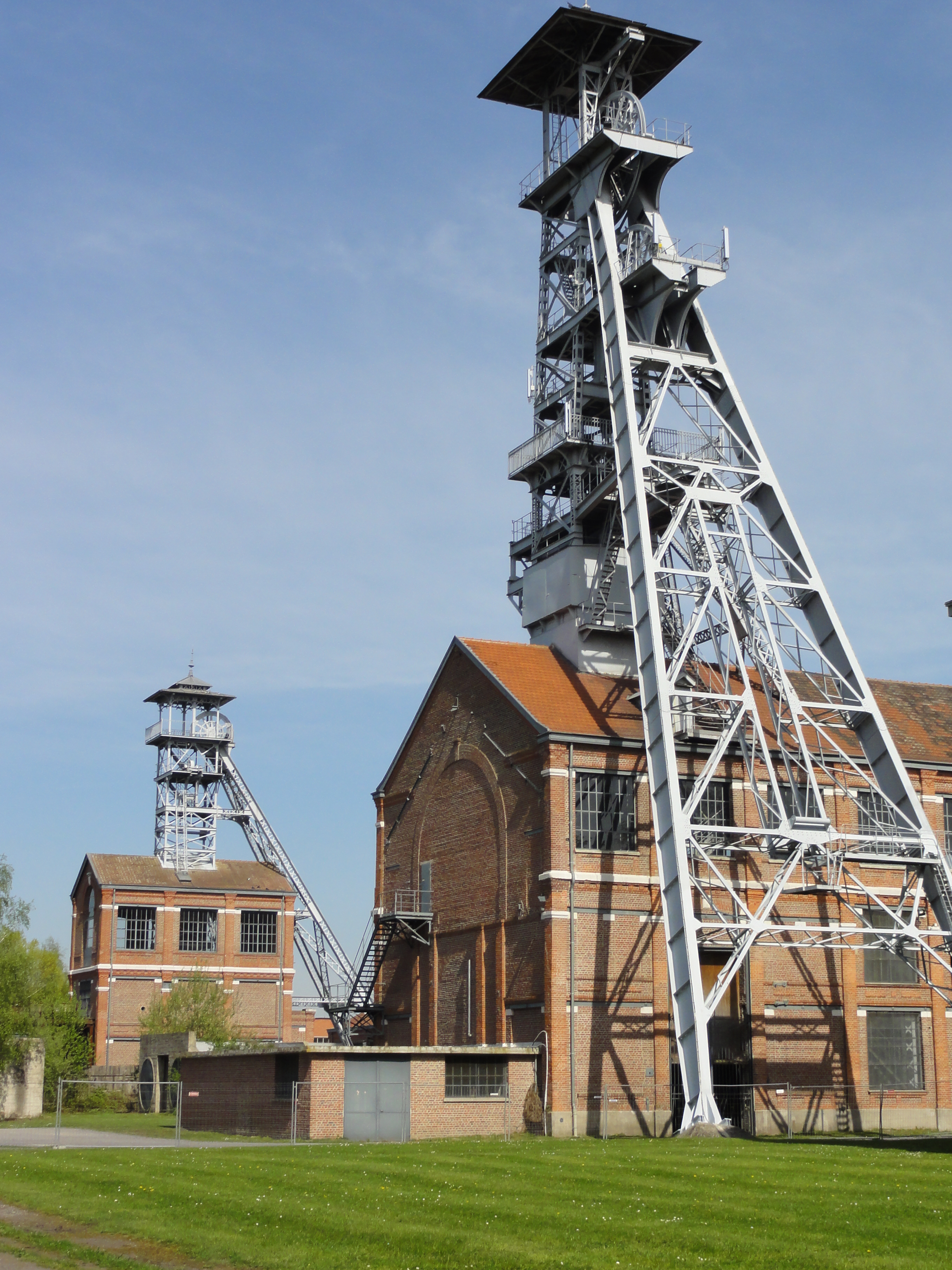
Shafts 2 and 1.

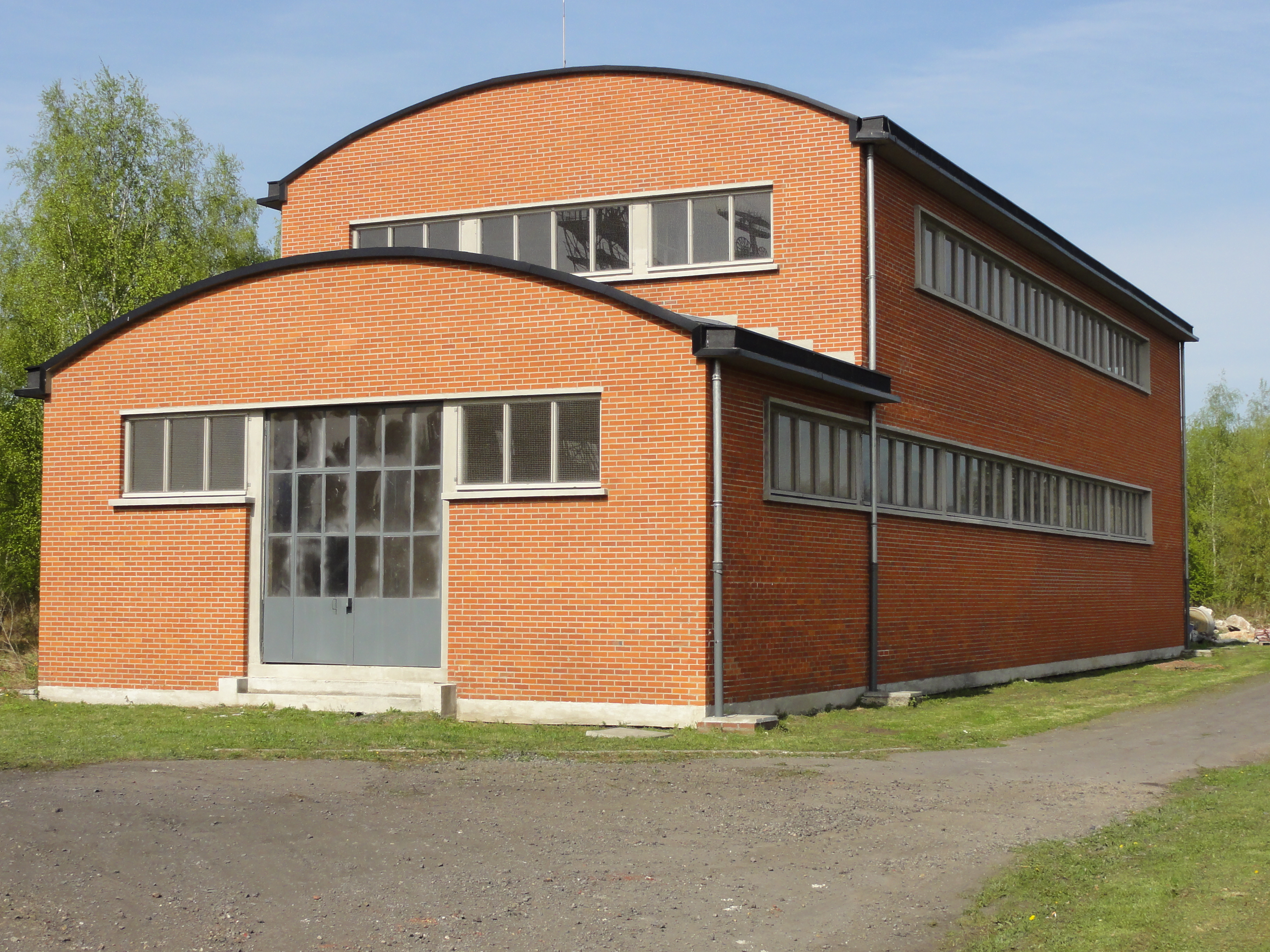
The switchgear room.

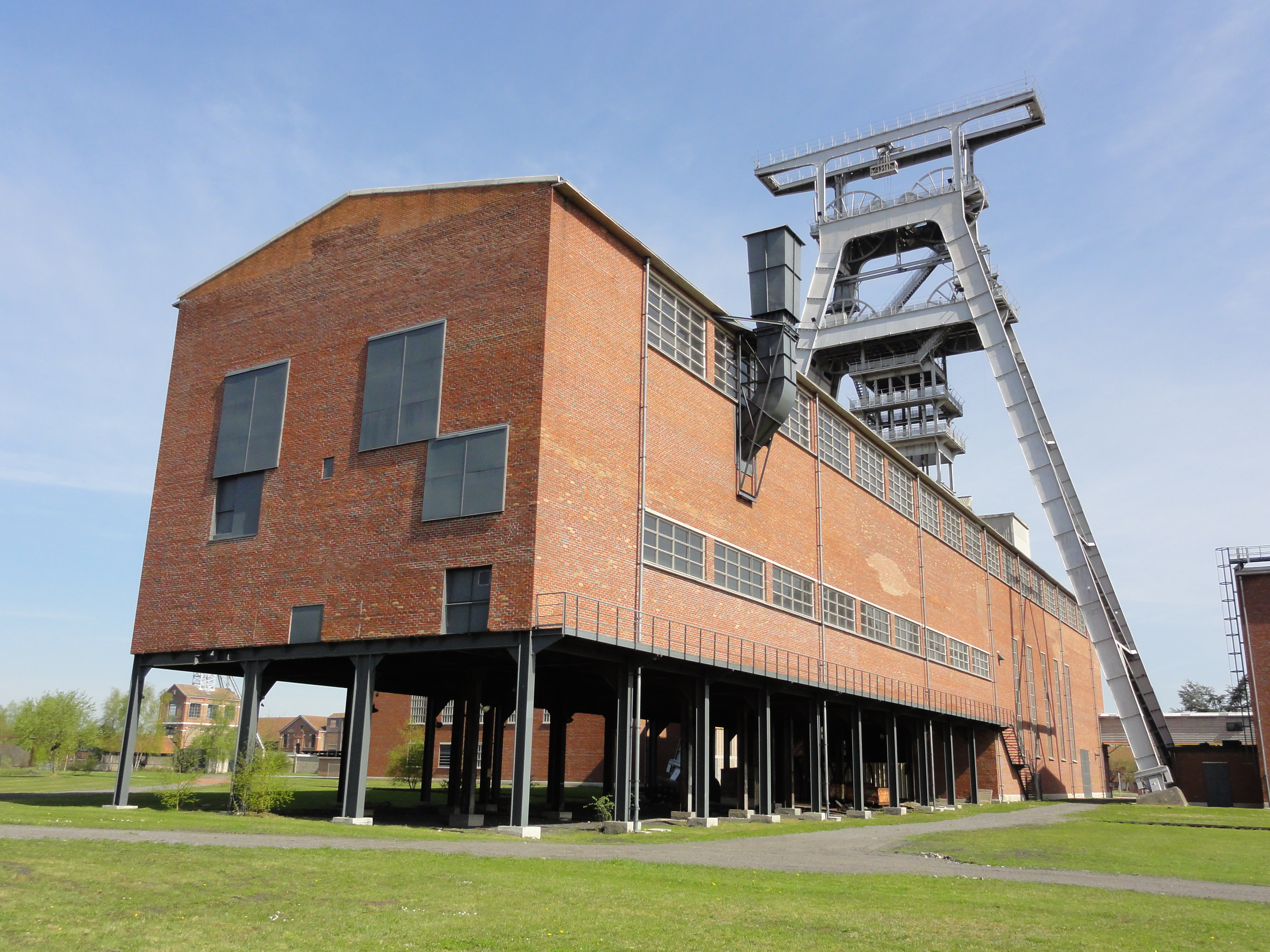
Shafts 3 and 4.

== Spoil heaps ==
Operation of the Arenberg pit led to the creation of two spoil heaps.

=== Spoil heap no. 160, Arenberg ===
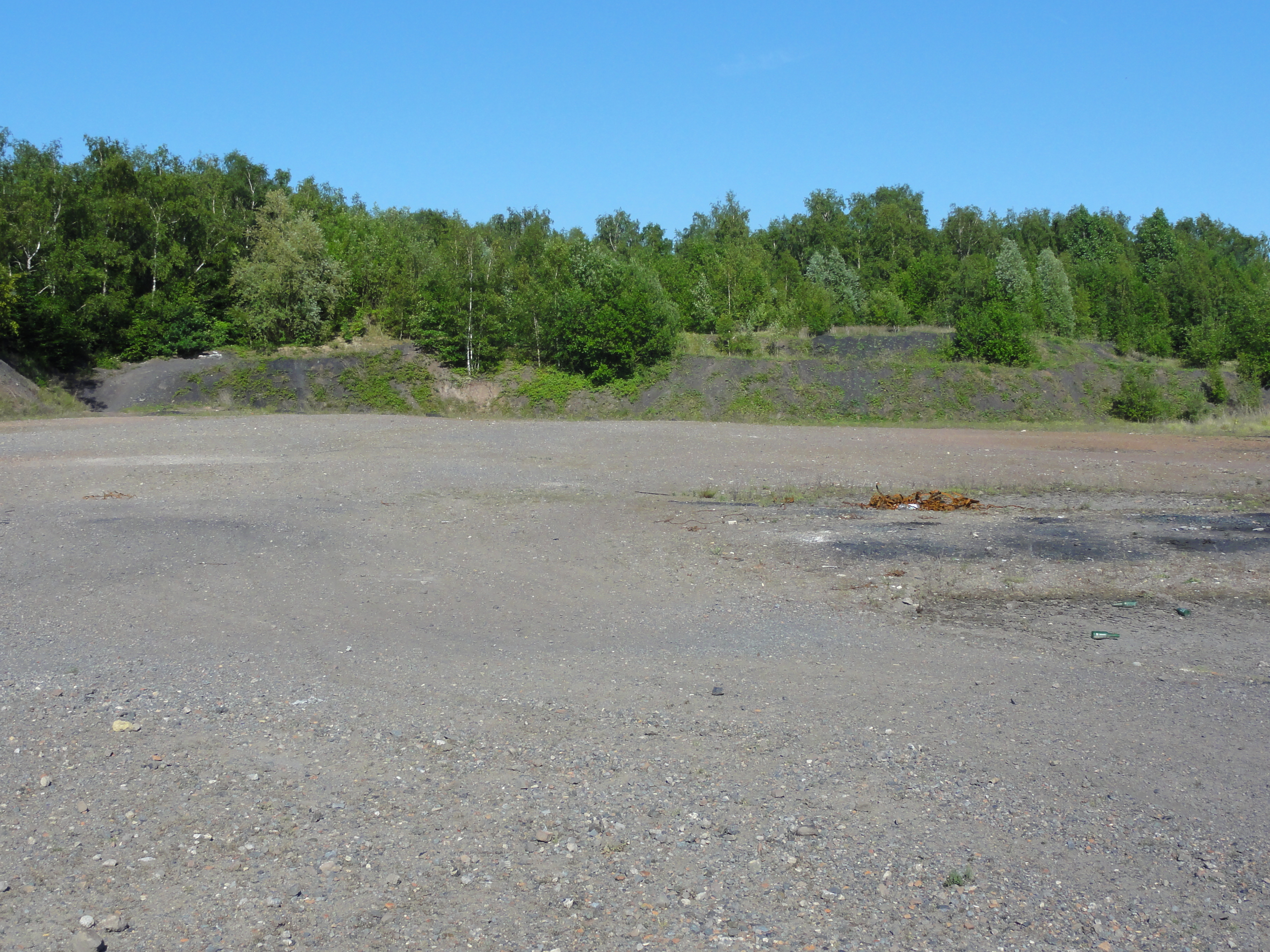
The Arenberg slag heap.

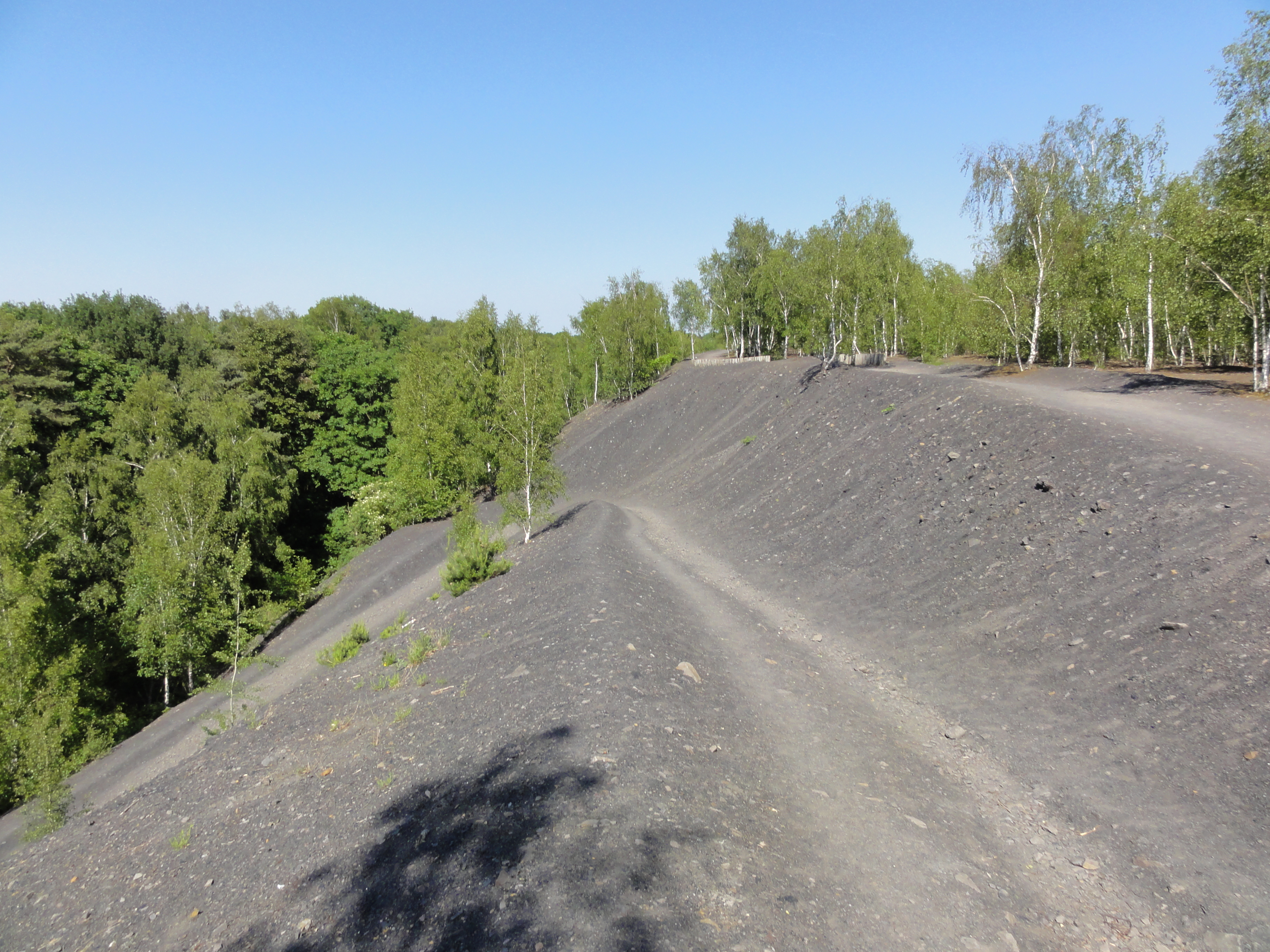
The Mare à Goriaux slag heap.

Spoil heap No. 160, Arenberg, located in Wallers, is a conical mining heap associated with the Arenberg Pit. Originally reaching a height of 100 meters, it began to be quarried in 1980, leaving only its base intact.

=== Spoil heap no. 171, Mare à Goriaux ===
Spoil heap No. 171, Mare à Goriaux, located in Wallers and Raismes, is a flat mining heap associated with the Arenberg Pit. Measuring about 20 meters in height and extending nearly two kilometers, it has been fully preserved. Together with the Mare à Goriaux mining subsidence pond, it is one of 353 elements across 109 sites inscribed on the UNESCO World Heritage List on June 30, 2012, as part of site No. 15.

== The miners’ housing estates ==
The housing estates associated with the Arenberg Pit have been preserved and are considered notable examples of miners’ housing. These include the Bellaing garden suburb (in Bellaing), the Arenberg miners’ estate, the Nouveau Monde garden suburb, and the modern estates of La Drève and Le Bosquet (in Wallers). They are among 353 elements across 109 sites inscribed on the UNESCO World Heritage List on June 30, 2012, as part of site No. 15.

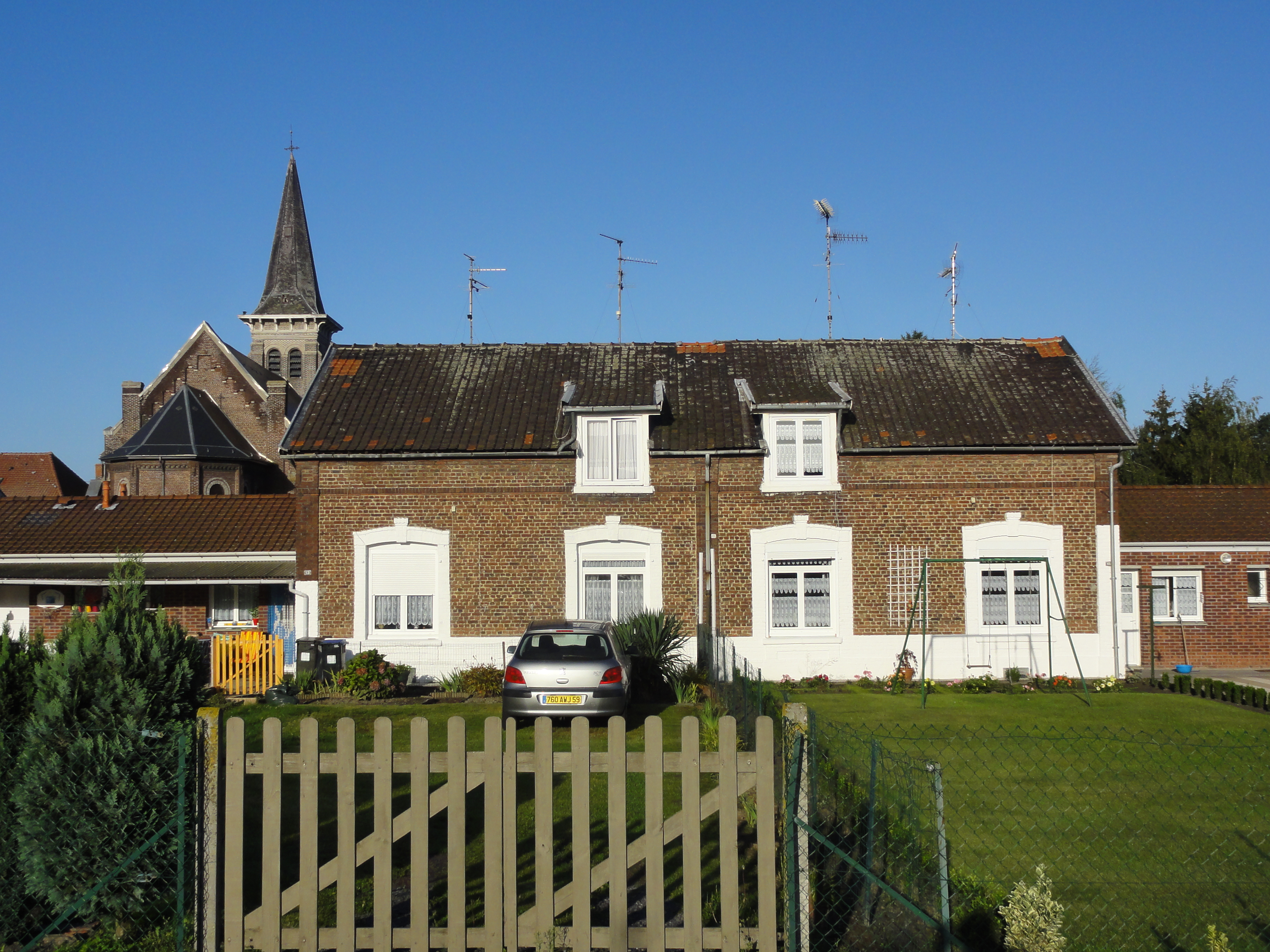
Houses grouped in fours.

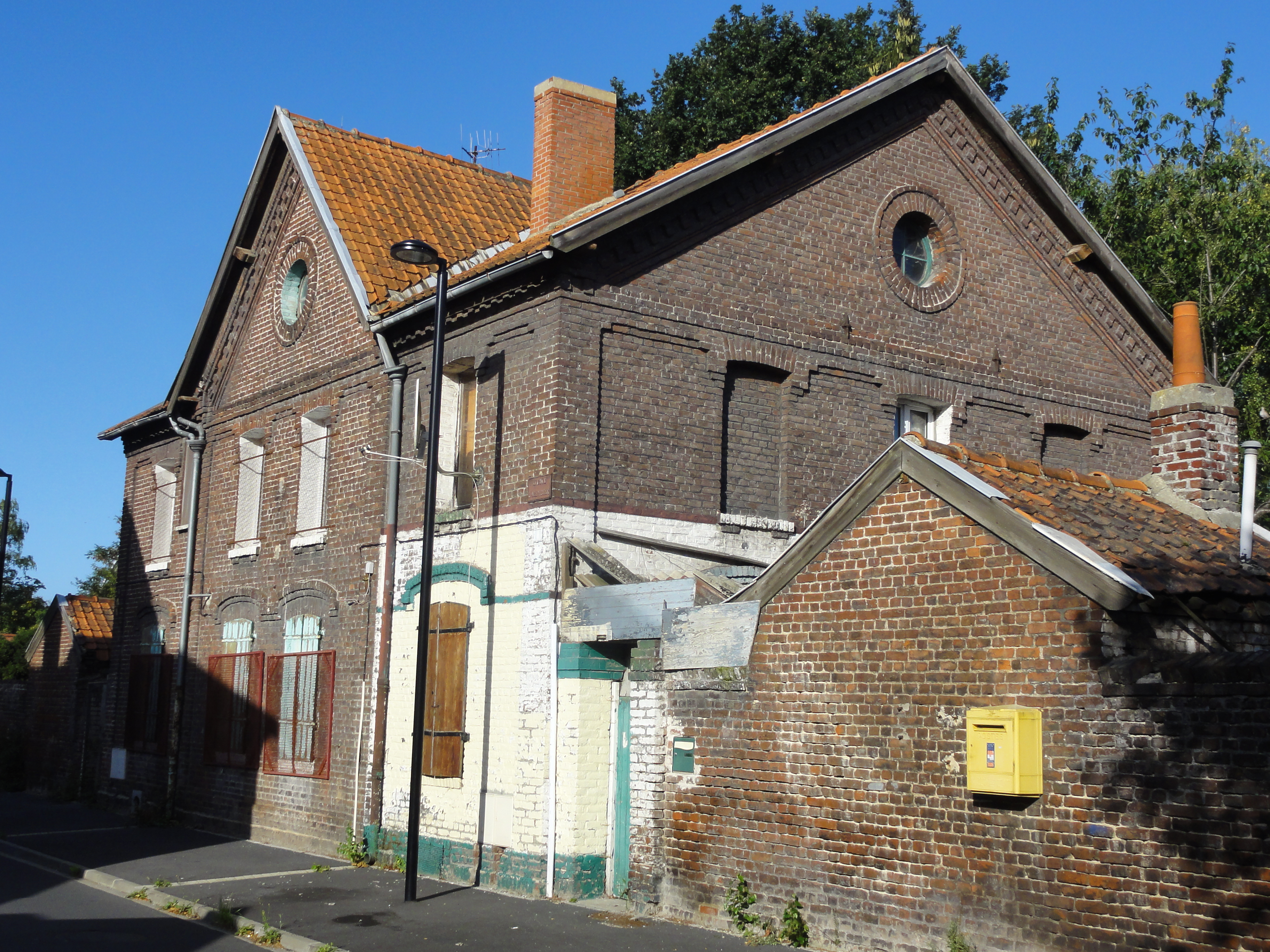
Houses near the entrance to the pit.

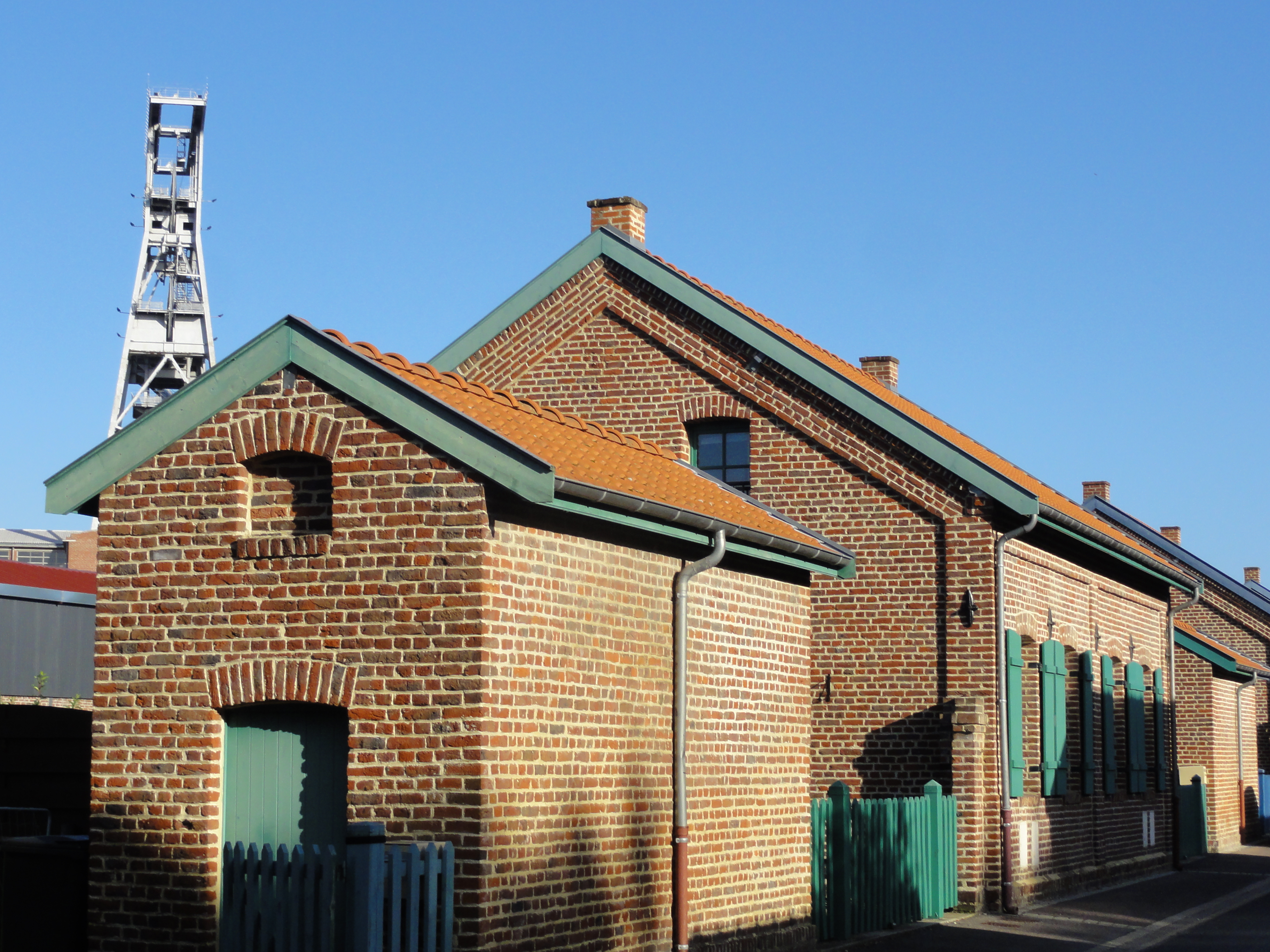
Street where Germinal was filmed.

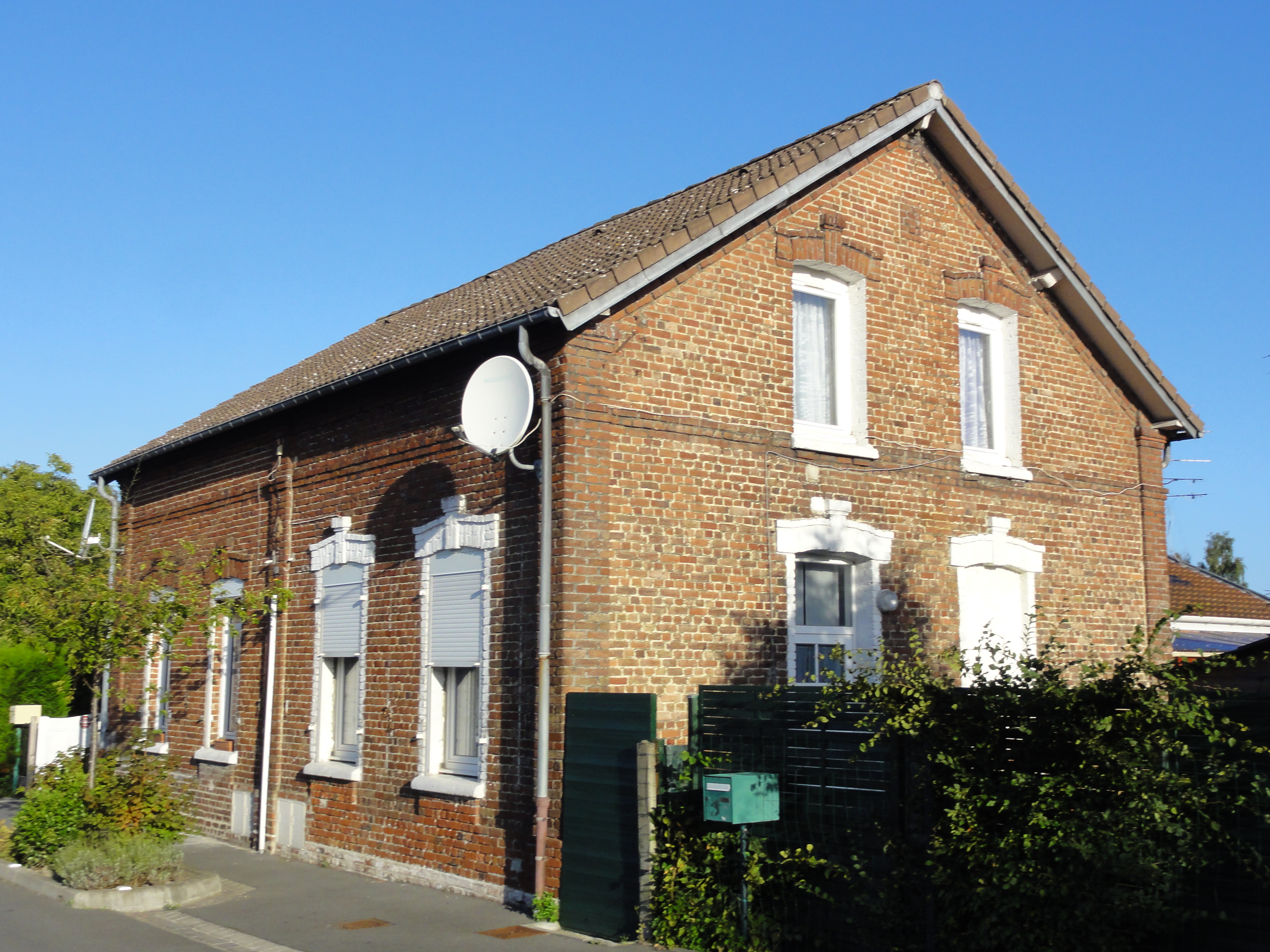
Housing typical of the Compagnie d'Anzin.

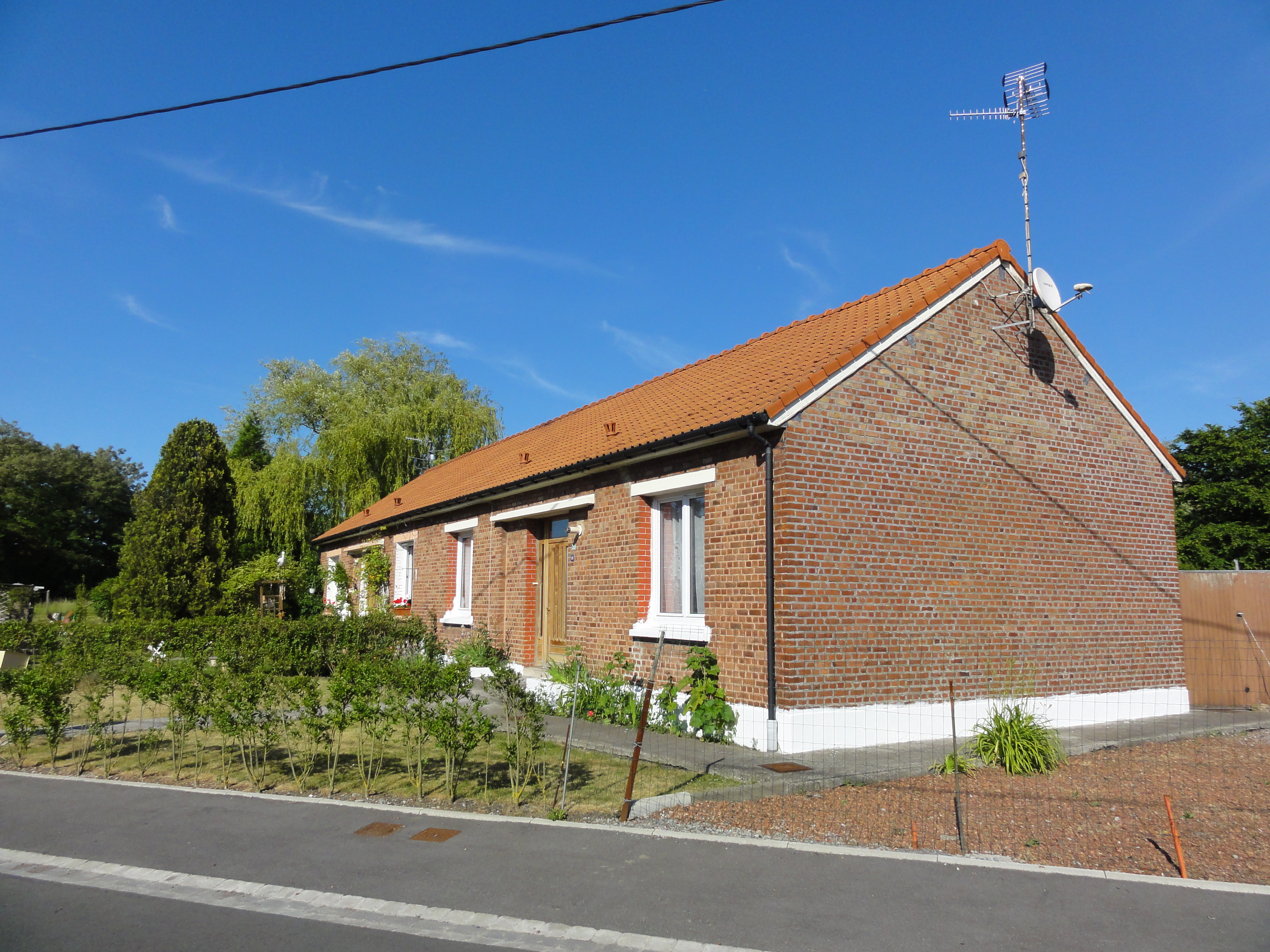
Housing after nationalization.

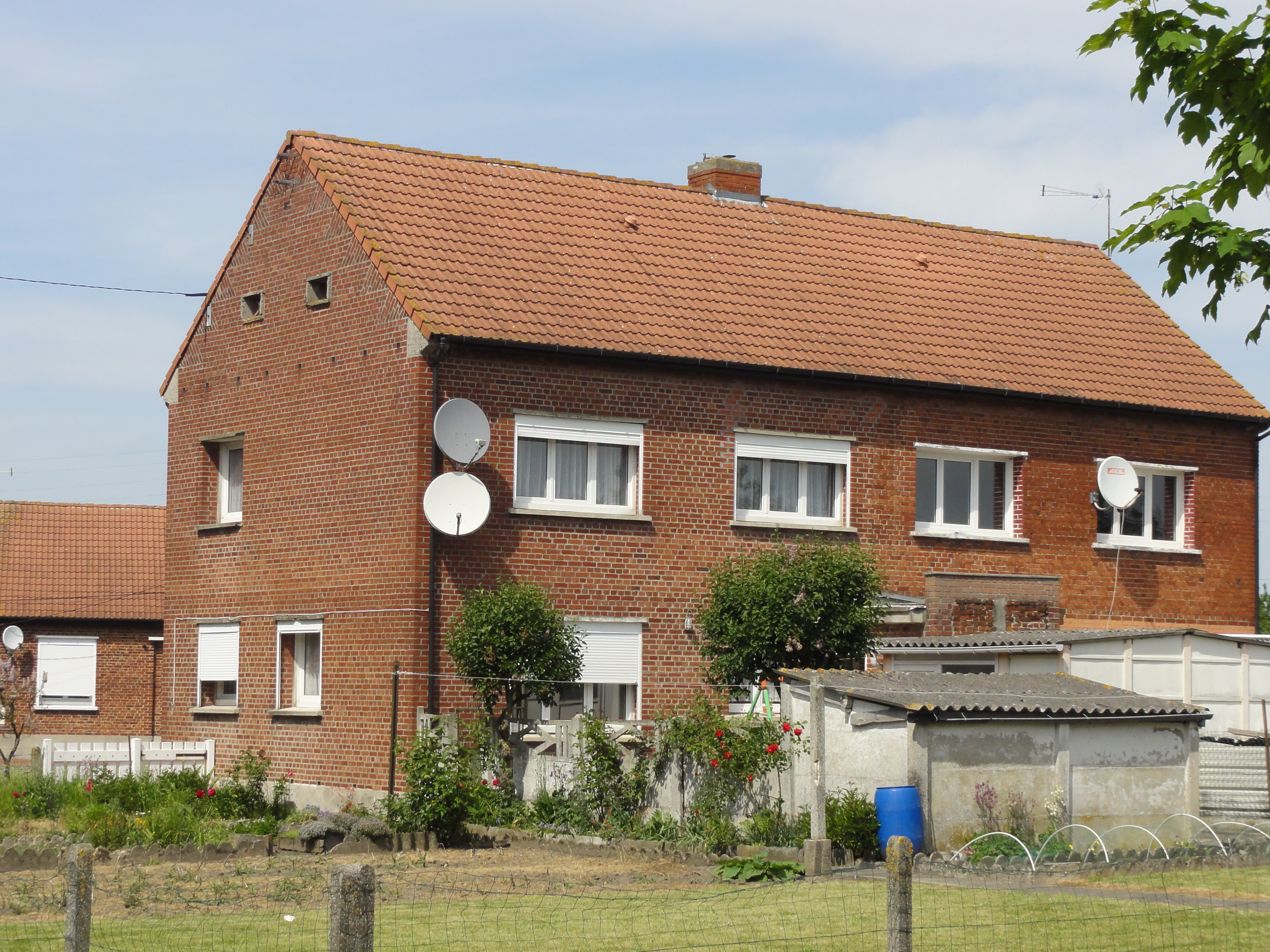
Housing after nationalization.

=== Arenberg Estate ===
The Arenberg estate was constructed beginning in 1900 to the east of the pithead and its railway, on the territory of Wallers and, for a few houses, Raismes. Built in several phases up to 1923, the estate primarily consists of semi-detached two-family houses arranged along the streets.

=== Nouveau Monde Estate ===
The Nouveau Monde estate in Wallers was initiated in 1906, located to the west of the pit and beyond its railway line. Construction continued until 1930, and the estate consists of semi-detached two-family houses.

=== Bellaing Estate ===
The Bellaing estate in Bellaing was constructed between the two World Wars following an orthogonal layout. Most buildings contain four dwellings each and are aligned at the center of their plots, except for those located at the edges of the estate.

=== Bosquet Estate ===
The Bosquet estate in Wallers, along with the Drève estate, was developed by the Valenciennes Group. Construction occurred in two phases, in 1947 and 1967. The estate features a road network of both curved and straight streets, and the houses each contain one or two dwellings with one or two stories.

=== Drève Estate ===
The Drève estate in Wallers was constructed by the Valenciennes Group between 1948 and 1950. Its road network comprises both curved and straight streets. The residential buildings each contain two dwellings, distributed over one or two floors.

=== The Director’s House ===
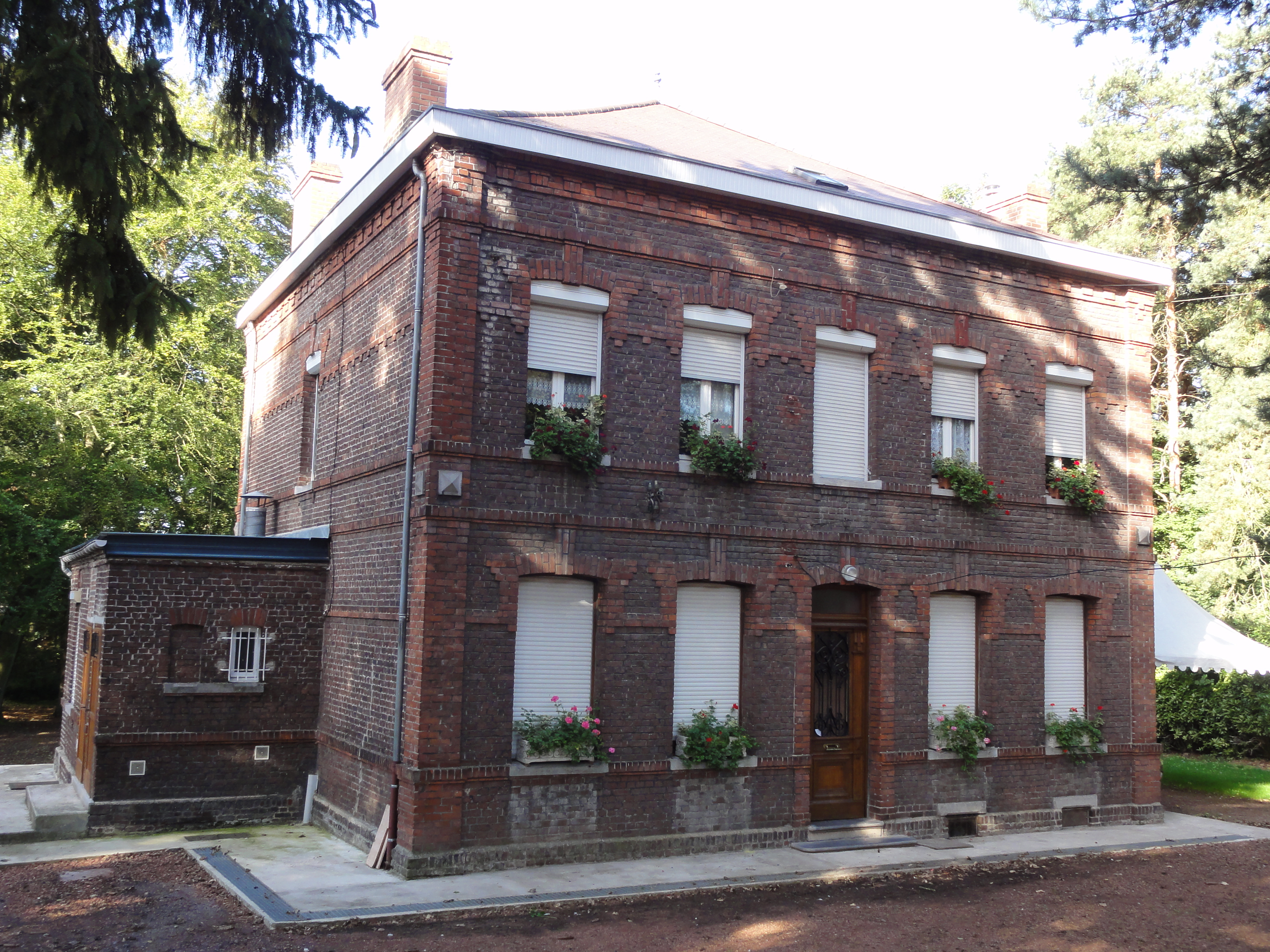
The director's residence.

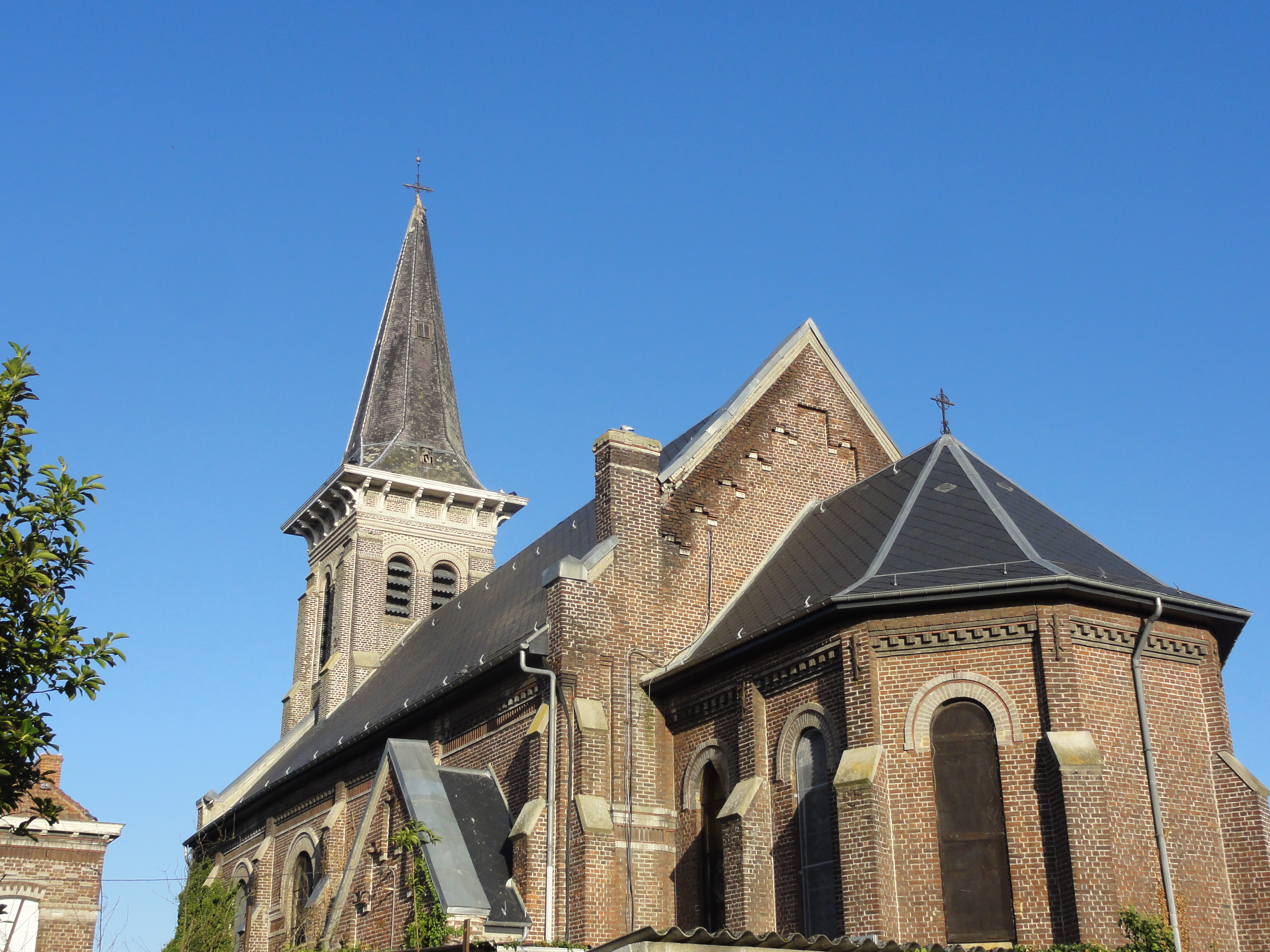
Rear view of the church.

The director’s house was built near the mine shaft.

=== Saint Barbara Church ===
Saint Barbara Church was built at the center of the housing estate. It is among the 353 components across 109 sites inscribed on the UNESCO World Heritage List on June 30, 2012.

=== Schools ===
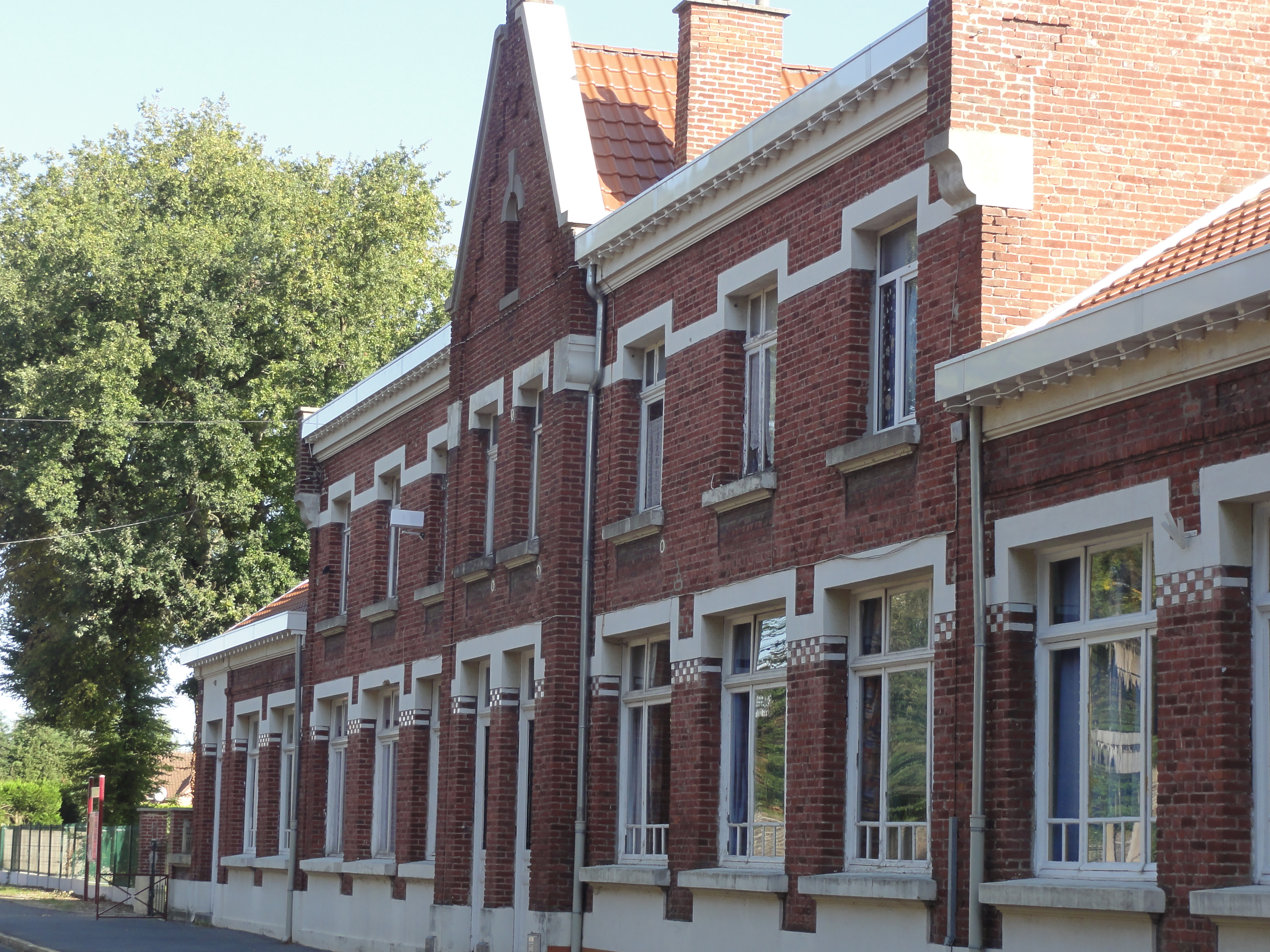
Schools.

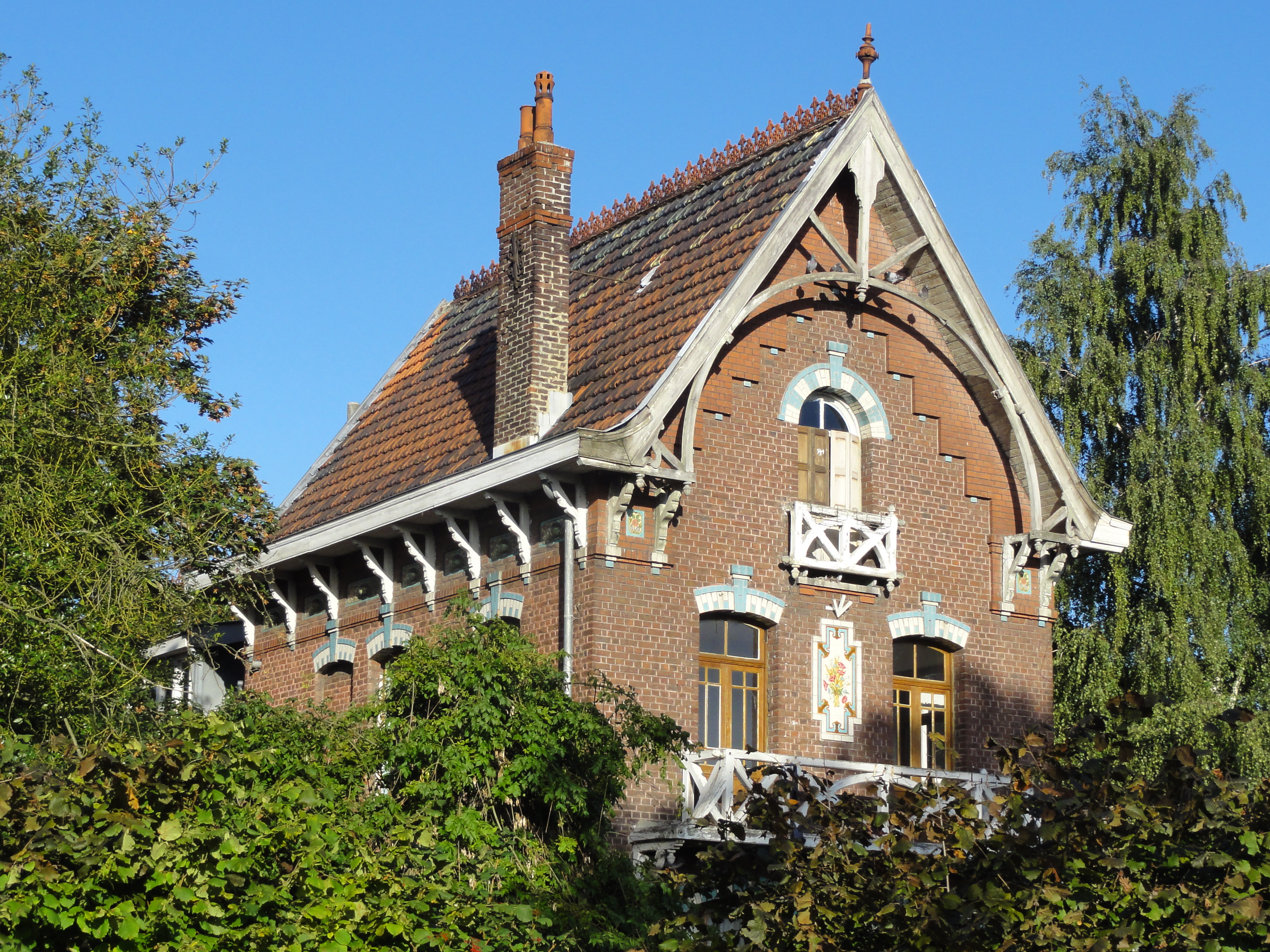
The domestic science school.

The first schools in the estate were constructed to the south, near the railway branch serving the mine. Additional schools were opened in the 1930s closer to the pit. These schools are part of the 353 components across 109 sites inscribed on the UNESCO World Heritage List on June 30, 2012.

=== Domestic science school ===
The façades and roofs of the former domestic science school have been listed as Monuments historiques since December 1, 2009. The school is also among the 353 components across 109 sites inscribed on the UNESCO World Heritage List on June 30, 2012.

=== Community hall ===
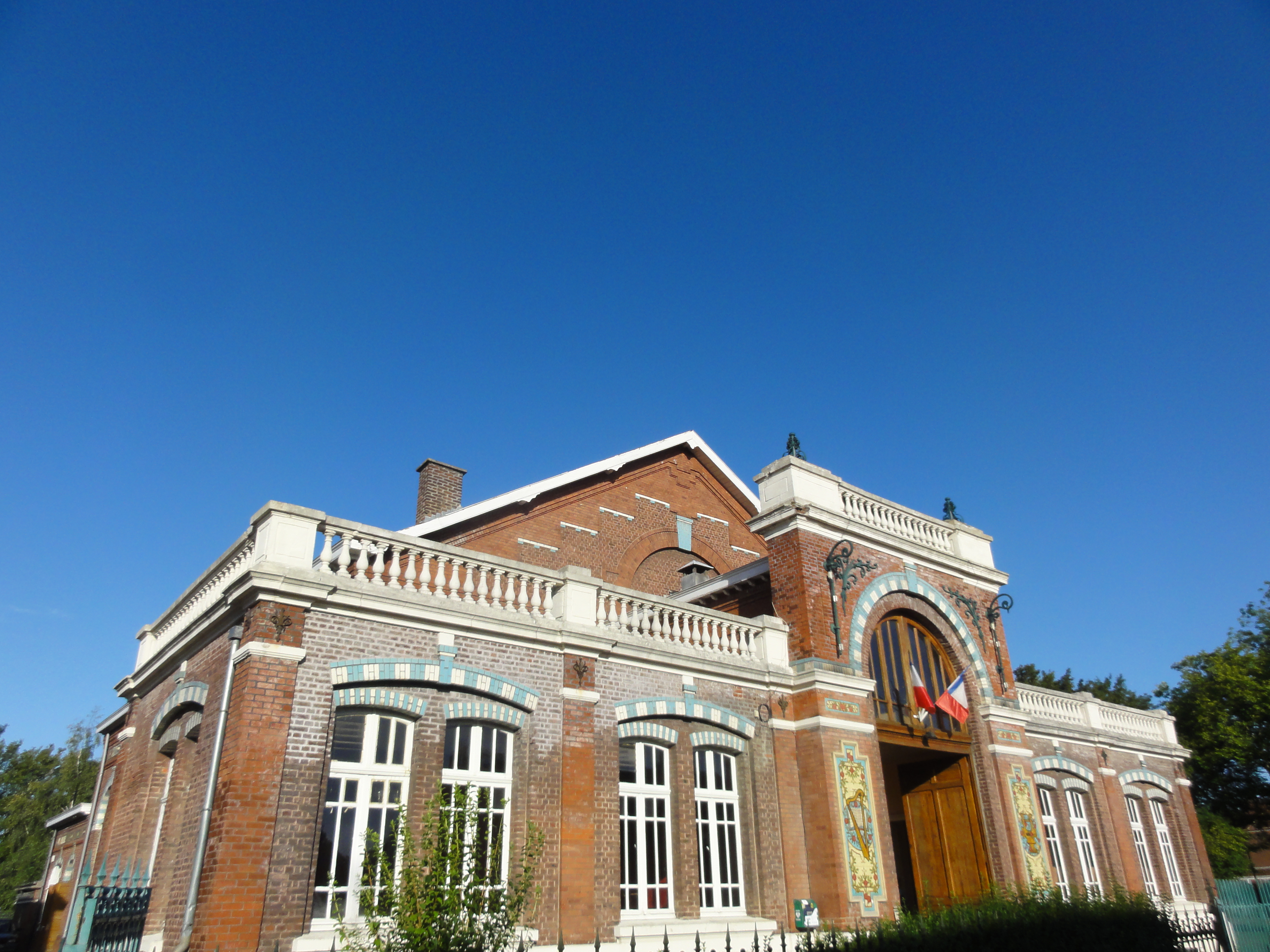
The party room.

The façades and roofs of the community hall, along with the vestibule and entrance drum décor, doors, and stage wall with its sculpted decoration, have been listed as Monuments historiques since December 3, 2009. The hall is also among the 353 components across 109 sites inscribed on the UNESCO World Heritage List on June 30, 2012.

=== Pharmacy ===
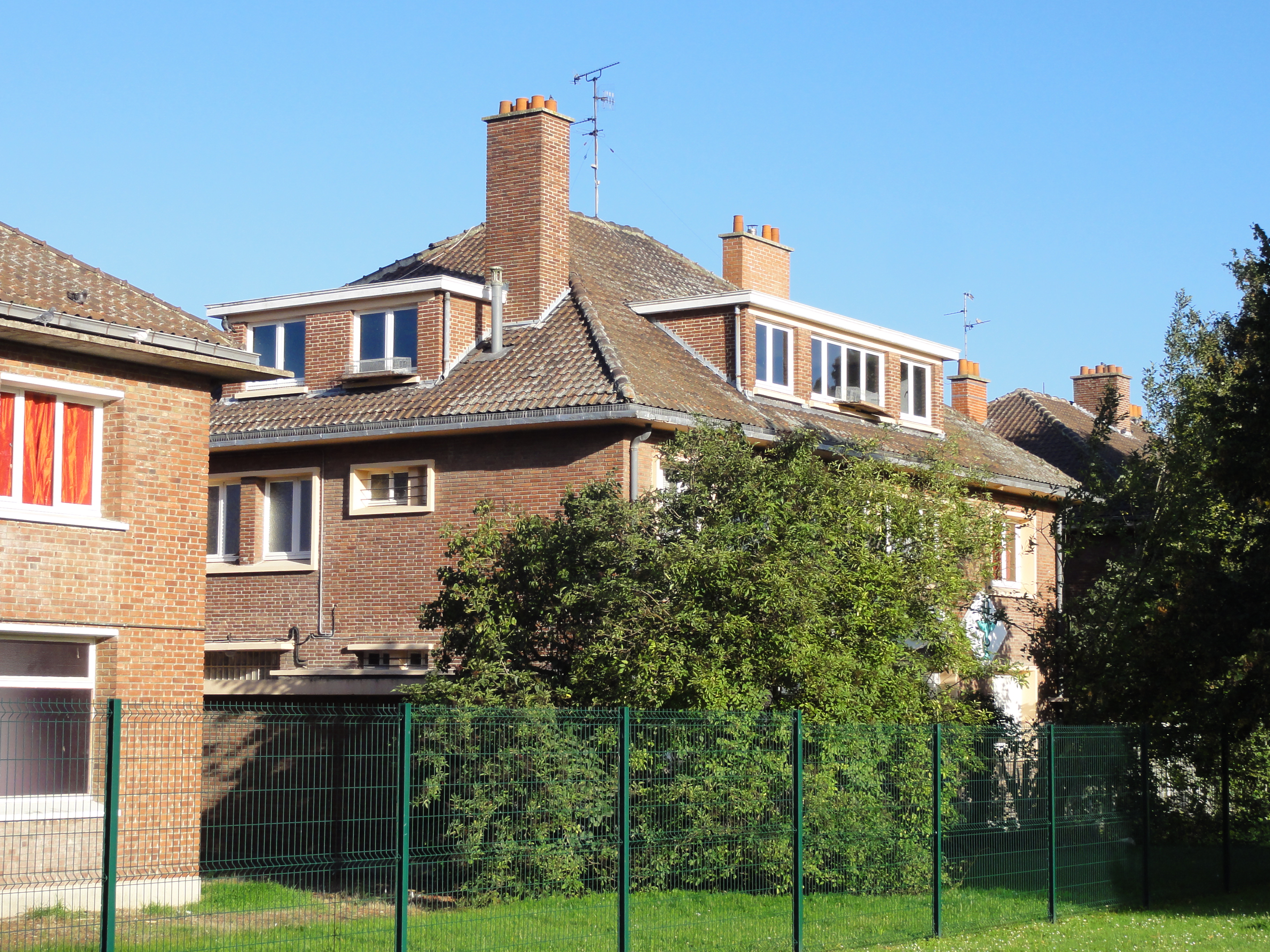
The pharmacy.

The pharmacy is located at the center of the estates, alongside the medical health center. It is among the 353 components across 109 sites inscribed on the UNESCO World Heritage List on June 30, 2012.

=== Cemetery ===
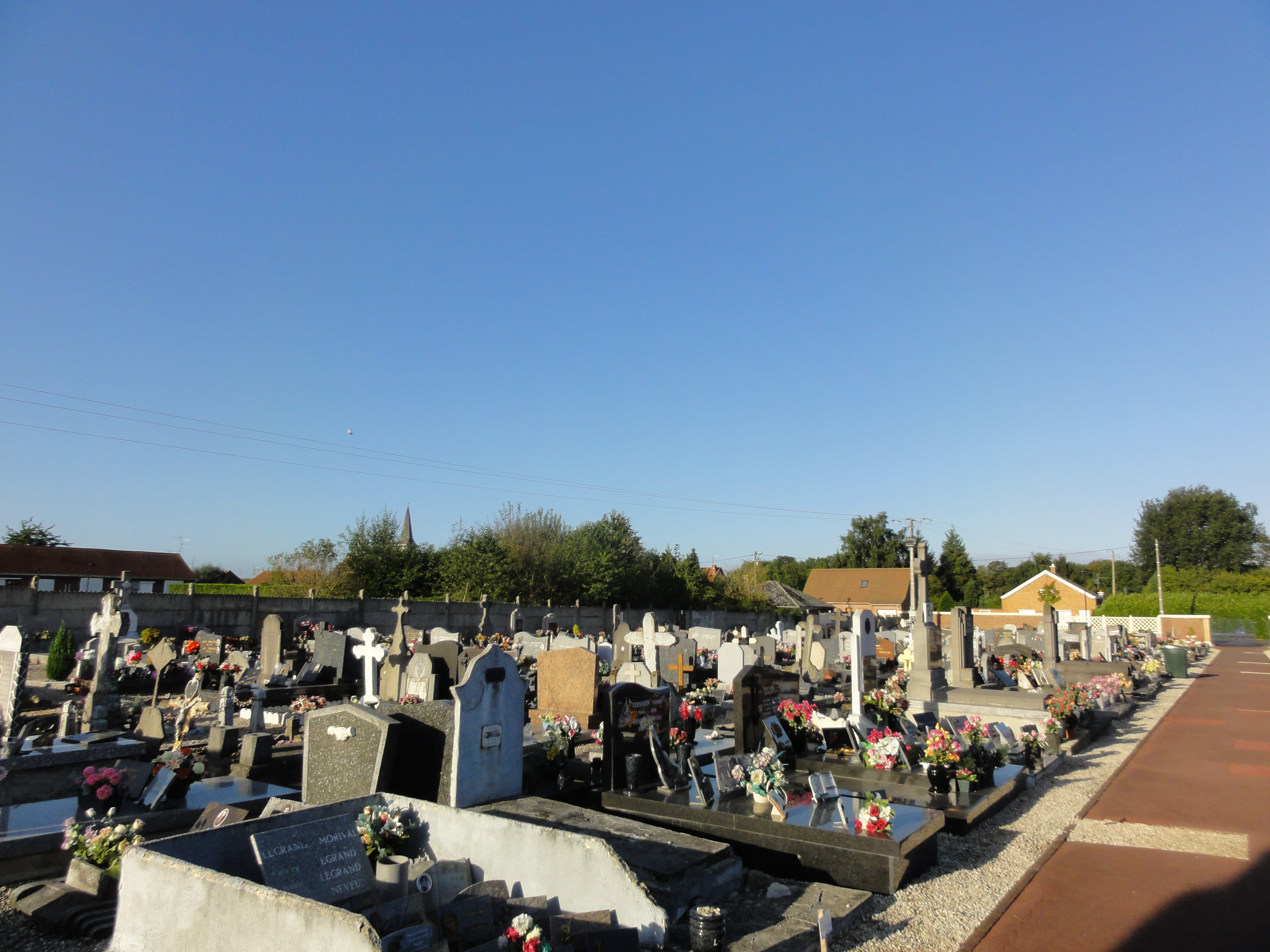
The cemetery.

A new cemetery was established to the east of the housing estates, as the Wallers cemetery is located 3,600 meters to the southwest.

== See also ==
- Compagnie des mines d'Anzin
- Auguste Louis Albéric d'Arenberg

== Bibliography ==
- Dubois, Guy; Minot, Jean-Marie (1991). Histoire des Mines du Nord et du Pas-de-Calais : Des origines à 1939-45 [History of the Mines of Nord and Pas-de-Calais: From their origins to 1939-45] (in French). Vol. I. pp. 28–30.
- Dubois, Guy; Minot, Jean-Marie (1992). Histoire des Mines du Nord et du Pas-de-Calais : De 1946 à 1992 [History of the Mines of Nord and Pas-de-Calais: From 1946 to 1992] (in French). Vol. II.
- Gosselet, Jules (1913). Les assises crétaciques et tertiaires dans les fosses et les sondages du Nord de la France : Région de Valenciennes [Cretaceous and Tertiary strata in pits and boreholes in northern France: Valenciennes region] (in French). Vol. IV. Paris: Imprimerie nationale. p. 158.
- Dolliazal, M; Salignac, A. L; Yang, B; Cheimanoff, N; Ledoux, E; Mercier, D (1994). Modélisation de la remontée de pression de gaz dans les anciens travaux miniers du Bassin Nord Pas-de-Calais - Étude de la faisabilité appliquée à la fosse d'Arenberg [Modeling gas pressure build-up in former mining works in the Nord Pas-de-Calais Basin - Feasibility study applied to the Arenberg pit] (in French). École des Mines de Paris, ARMINES.
