= Pierre d'Arenberg =

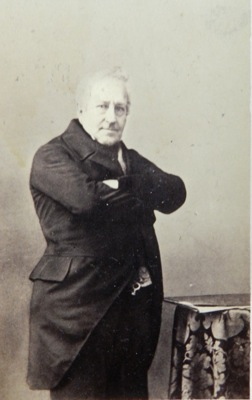
Portrait of Prince Pierre d'Arenberg

Prince Pierre d'Alcantara-Charles-Marie d'Arenberg, 1st Duke of Arenberg (Paris, 2 October 1790 – Brussels, 27 September 1877) was a member of the House of Arenberg who became a French military officer and politician.

== Life and career ==
He was born on 2 October 1790 as a younger son of Louis Engelbert, 6th Duke of Arenberg. He entered into the service of France. He distinguished himself during the campaigns in Spain and followed Emperor Napoleon in the Russian campaign, as an officer of ordinance.

He was made a duke and peer of France on 5 November 1827, and he became a naturalized French subject by order of King Charles X on 28 February 1828. He was a member of the French Chamber of Peers.

He founded the French cadet branch of the House of Arenberg, and his male-line descendants still bear the French noble title of duc d'Arenberg (Duke of Arenberg).

== Marriage and children ==
He married twice. The first marriage took place in Paris on 27 January 1829, to Alix Marie Charlotte de Talleyrand-Périgord (4 November 1808 – 21 September 1842), and they had four children. The second marriage was on 19 June 1860, to Caroline Léopoldine Jeanne, princesse de Kaunitz-Rietberg-Questenberg (1801–1875).

He and his first wife had the following children:

- Marie Nicolette (1830–1905), married Charles de Merode, 10th Marquess of Westerlo
- Ernest Marie (1833–1837)
- Louis Charles (1837–1870), murdered at St. Petersburg
- Auguste Louis (1837–1924), married Jeanne Marie Louise Greffulhe
