= Auguste Louis Albéric d'Arenberg =

French noble and monarchist politician

Prince Auguste d'Arenberg
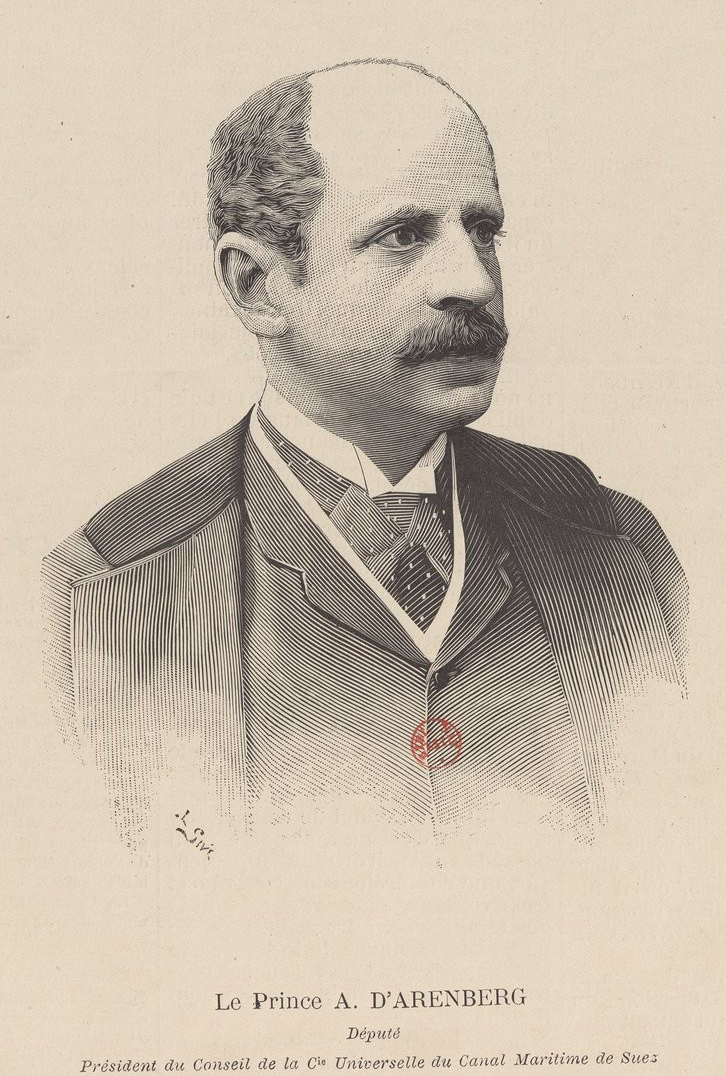

Member of the Chamber of Deputies
- In office 1889–1902
- In office 1877–1881

Personal details
- Born: Auguste Louis Albéric d'Arenberg; 15 September 1837 Paris, France
- Died: 24 January 1924 (aged 86) Paris, France
- Spouse: Jeanne Marie Louise Greffulhe (m. 1868; died 1891)
- Children: 4
- Parent(s): Pierre d'Arenberg, 1st Duke of Arenberg; Alix de Talleyrand-Périgord

Prince Auguste Louis Albéric d'Arenberg, 2nd Duke of Arenberg, (15 September 1837 – 24 January 1924) was a French nobleman and monarchist politician who served in the Chamber of Deputies. Upon the death of his father in 1877, he inherited the French noble title of duc d'Arenberg (Duke of Arenberg) and became the head of the French cadet branch of the House of Arenberg. He was noted for his great wealth and extensive properties throughout France, particularly at Menetou-Salon in the Cher department.

== Early life ==
Born in Paris on 15 September 1837, he was the third son of Prince Pierre d'Arenberg, 1st Duke of Arenberg (1790–1877) and his wife, Alix Marie Charlotte de Talleyrand-Périgord (1808–1842). His father had been made a duke and peer of France in 1827 and became a naturalized French subject by order of King Charles X in 1828.

Since both of his elder brothers died prematurely, he inherited his father's ducal title. His sister Marie Nicolette was married to Charles de Merode, 10th Marquess of Westerlo. After his mother's death in 1842, his father remarried in 1860 to Caroline Léopoldine Jeanne, Princess of Kaunitz-Rietberg-Questenberg.

His paternal grandfather was Louis Engelbert, 6th Duke of Arenberg, and his uncle was Prosper Louis, 7th Duke of Arenberg.

== Career ==
Arenberg served in the Chamber of Deputies from 1877 to 1881. He was elected as the official candidate of the MacMahon government, winning the poll due to the abstention of republican voters disenchanted with his predecessor. In the Chamber, he voted consistently with the monarchist Right and conservatives. He voted against the legalization of divorce.

Returned to parliament as a monarchist candidate in 1889, Arenberg continued his opposition to republican government. After Rerum novarum and Pope Leo XIII's recognition of the Third Republic, however, Arenberg changed his rhetoric, campaigning in 1893 as a "liberal republican". In the Chamber, he concentrated on colonial issues, in particular those concerning Africa. Among his projects were securing free navigation of the Niger River and delineating Anglo-French colonial boundaries.

Defeated in the 1902 elections and failing to secure reelection in 1906, Arenberg retired from politics but remained active in public life. He was the first president of the pro-colonial Comité de l'Afrique française and remained active with the organization until his death.

A convinced Catholic himself, he was one of the organizers in 1895 of a failed attempt to build a mosque in Paris through private donations. From 1896, he was also president of the Compagnie universelle du canal maritime de Suez, and he was a member of the Institut de France (Académie des Beaux-Arts) from 1897.

== Personal life ==
On 18 June 1868, Arenberg married Jeanne Marie Louise Greffulhe (1850–1891). She was the elder daughter of Count Louis-Charles Greffulhe and Félicité-Pauline-Marie de La Rochefoucauld d'Estissac, and a sister of Henry Greffulhe (a personal friend of author Marcel Proust).

They were the parents of four children:

- Alix Jeanne Marie d'Arenberg (1869–1924), who married Pierre Adolphe, Marquis de Laguiche, a descendant of Louis Henri, Duke of Bourbon.
- Charles Louis Pierre d'Arenberg (1871–1919), who married Antoinette Hélène Emma Louise de Gramont de Lesparre (1883–1958), a granddaughter of the 10th Duke of Gramont and cousin of the 12th Duke of Gramont.
- Louise Marie Charlotte d'Arenberg (1872–1958), who married Louis Antoine Melchior, Marquis de Vogüé.
- Ernest Hélie Charles Marie d'Arenberg (1886–1915), who died during World War I.

The Duke of Arenberg died on 24 January 1924. Since both of his sons predeceased him, the ducal title was inherited by his eldest male-line grandson.

=== Descendants ===
Through his son Charles Louis, he was the grandfather of Prince Charles Auguste Armand d'Arenberg (1905–1967). The latter became the 3rd Duke of Arenberg in 1924 and married American heiress Margaret Bancroft in 1960 as her second husband. They had one child together, Prince Pierre Frederic Henri d'Arenberg (b. 1961), who became the 4th Duke of Arenberg. After the 3rd Duke of Arenberg died in 1967, she married Emmanuel de Crussol, 15th Duke of Uzès, as his second wife.

== See also ==
- Arenberg Pit
- Arenberg Trench
- Château de Menetou-Salon
- Prix d'Arenberg
