= Charbonnages de France =

- Incorporated: France
- Founded: 1946; 80 years ago
- Defunct: 2007
- Headquarters: Paris, France
- Website: charbonnagesdefrance.fr

Charbonnages de France was a French enterprise created in 1946, as a result of the nationalization of the private mining companies. It was disbanded in 2007.
