= Siege of Rees (1599) =

1599 siege

- Part of the Eighty Years' War and the Anglo-Spanish War (1585–1604)
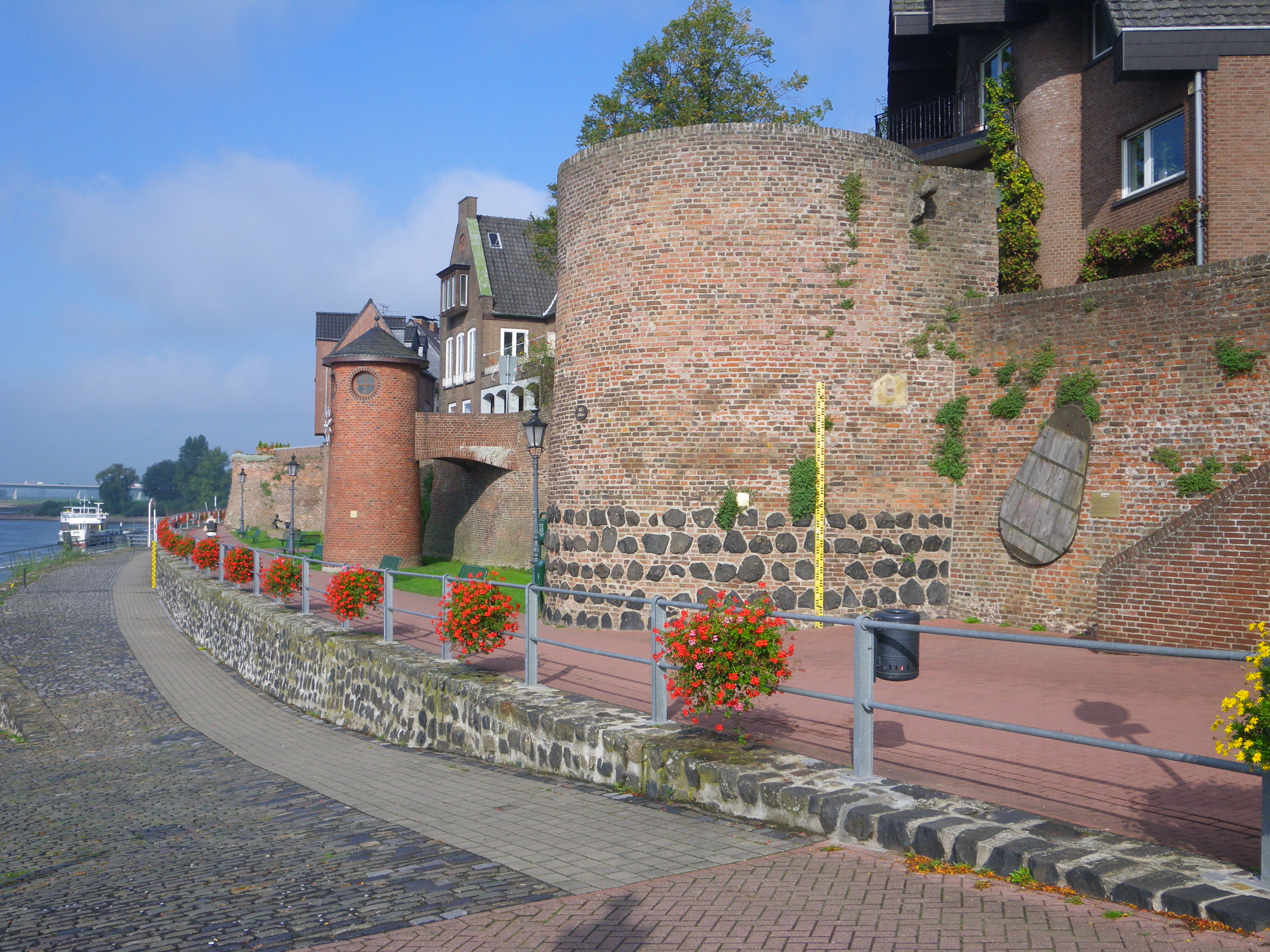
- Photograph of the old walls of Rees in 2011.
Date	September 10–12, 1599
Location	Rees, Lower Rhine, Duchy of Cleves (present-day Germany)
Result	Spanish victory: Protestant-German mercenary army destroyed; Re-established Spanish control of the fortress of Rheinberg

Belligerents
Dutch Republic; Palatinate; Brunswick-Lüneburg; Lower Saxon Circle	Spanish Empire

Commanders and leaders
Count of Lippe; Count of Solms; Philip of Hohenlohe; Supported by: Maurice of Nassau	Ramiro de Guzmán; Hendrik van den Bergh; Supported by: Francisco de Mendoza

Casualties and losses
Count of Lippe: 2,000–2,500; Hohenlohe & Solms: Unknown	1,500–3,000

The siege of Rees of 1599, also known as the relief of Rees (Socorro de Rees in Spanish), was an unsuccessful attempt by Protestant-German forces led by Count Simon VI of Lippe, and Anglo-Dutch forces sent by Prince Maurice of Nassau (Dutch: Maurits van Oranje), commanded by Philip of Hohenlohe-Neuenstein and the Count Ernst of Solms, to capture the strategic stronghold of Rees, Lower Rhine, Duchy of Cleves (present-day Germany) from the Spanish forces of Don Francisco de Mendoza, Admiral of Aragon, second-in-command of the Army of Flanders, and Governor Don Ramiro de Guzmán, between 10–12 September 1599, during the Eighty Years' War and the Anglo-Spanish War (1585–1604). This Spanish victory was part of the campaign of Francisco de Mendoza and Cardinal Andrew of Austria of 1598-1599, also called the Spanish Winter of 1598-99.

== Background ==
In 1598, under the mediation of the papal legate Cardinal Alessandro de'Medici (the future Pope Leo XI), Spain and France concluded the Peace of Vervins on 2 May. Spain gave up its conquests, except the occupation of the Prince-Archbishopric of Cambray, thereby restoring the situation of Cateau-Cambrésis. On 5 September, following the orders of the Archduke Albert of Austria, Governor-General of the Spanish Netherlands, Francisco de Mendoza at the head of the army, captured Orsoy from the Dutch defenders, a passage-town on the banks of the Lower Rhine. After the construction of a fort to defend the passage, the Spanish forces crossed over the Rhine and captured Alpen on 24 September, and the castle of Broich two days later. In mid-October, after the capture of Meurs on 12 October, the Spanish forces defeated the Dutch forces at Rheinberg, and re-captured the fortress. Then Mendoza divided his forces, invaded the province of Gelderland, and seized the town of Doetinchem on 8 November. Meanwhile, the rest of the Spanish army marched over the Lippe, and on 30 October captured Rees, forcing the garrison to surrender. The Spanish army established its winter quarters in these environs, and in the Bishopric of Münster.

In the spring of 1599, the Spanish army renewed the advance, and on May 15 the Spaniards besieged Zaltbommel, on the Waal river, but Maurice of Nassau, was able to keep a supply line open by means of a ship-bridge. On 13 June Mendoza retreated to the Fort San Andrés, a strategic place built by the Spaniards to control the rivers Meuse and Waal west of Heerewaarden.

== Siege of Rees ==
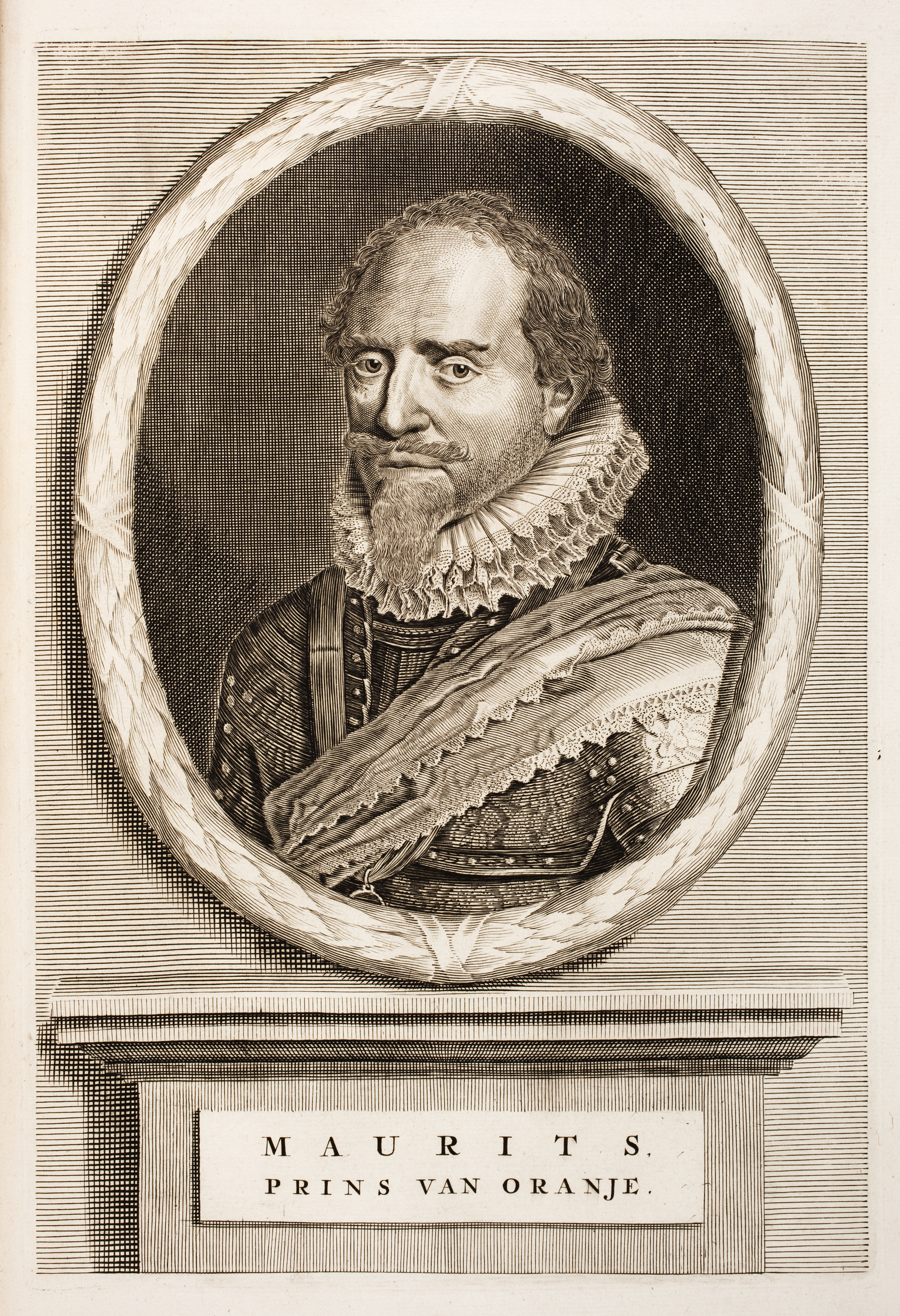
Portrait of Maurice of Nassau, Prince of Orange, by Hugo Grotius

In early September 1599, the Protestant-Dutch forces, supported by a German-mercenary army of 25,000 men led by Count Simon of Lippe advanced over Rees and laid siege to the town. On September 10, after a series of skirmishes near the town, the Spanish forces of Don Ramiro de Guzmán, Governor of Rees, supported by reinforcements sent by Don Francisco de Mendoza, lifted the enemy lines around Rees, causing a decisive defeat to the Protestant forces. The Spanish troops were outnumbered eight-to-one, but after two decisive assaults over the Protestant positions led by the two veteran captains Andrés de Ontoria and Andrés Ortiz, was sufficient to destroy the formations and defenses of the undisciplined and inexperienced German soldiers of the Protestant army. Count of Lippe's forces suffered about 2,000 to 2,500 casualties, hundreds of prisoners (about 400 prisoners), and a great part of the artillery and supplies were destroyed or captured. On the other hand, the casualties of the Spanish were minimal.

Despite the initial success in taking by surprise the fortress of Rheinberg on August 30, the offensive of the coalition forces of the Count of Lippe, Philip of Hohenlohe-Neuenstein, and the Count Ernst of Solms, turned into a humiliation. Thereafter, the German army evaporated, and the siege ended with the withdrawal of the rest of the Protestant forces.

== Aftermath ==
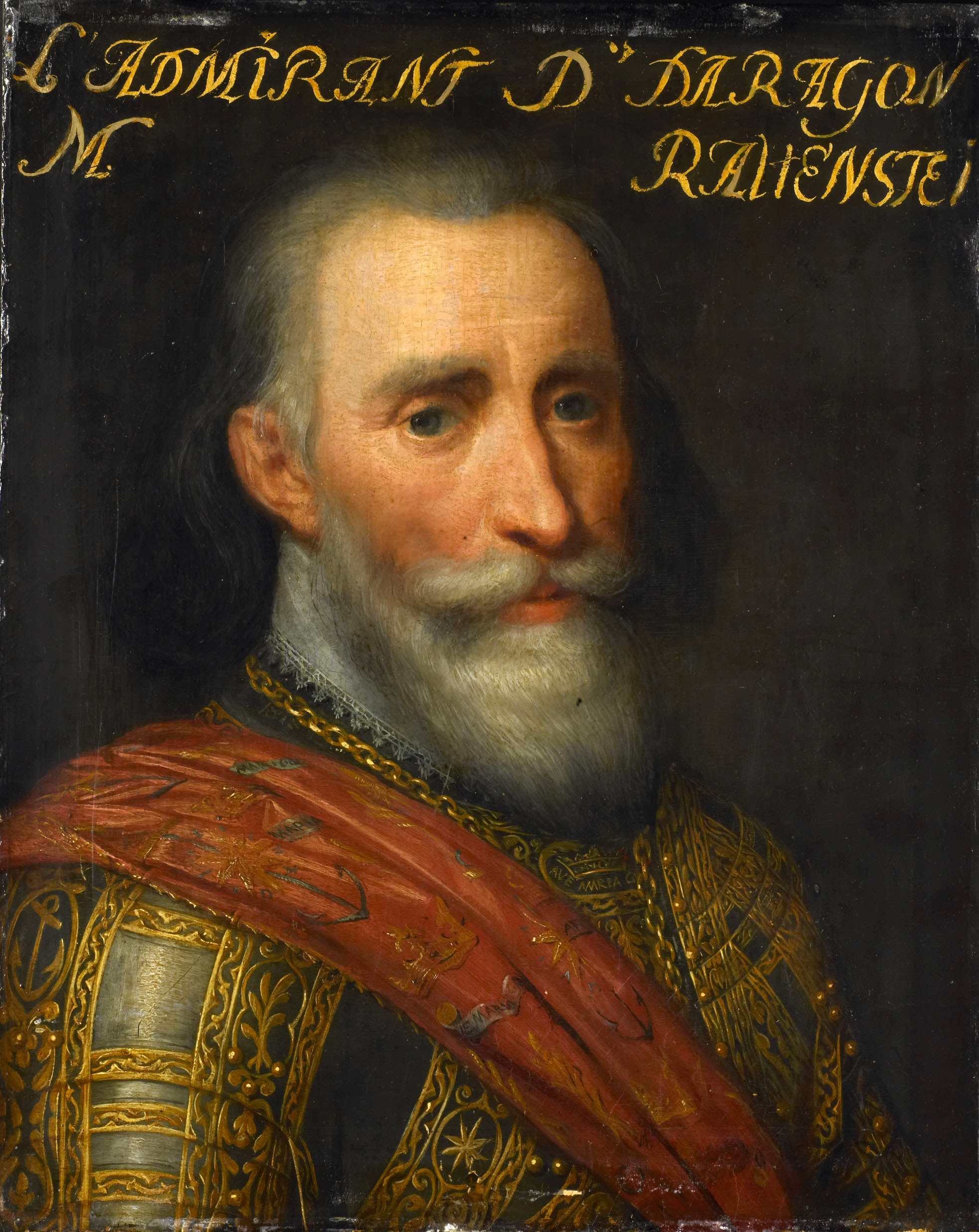
Portrait of Don Francisco de Mendoza, by Jan Antonisz. van Ravesteyn. Rijksmuseum Amsterdam

A few days after, the Spanish forces re-established control over the fortress of Rheinberg. By now, it had become clear that Spanish control of the Southern Netherlands was strong, and the threat of an invasion of the northern provinces was evident.

In 1600, with the Army of Flanders now temporarily in disarray, Johan van Oldenbarnevelt spied a strategic opportunity to deal with the Archduke Albert. Prince Maurice advanced in direction of the port of Dunkirk that had grown into a hotbed of privateers (the "Dunkirkers") that did much damage to Dutch and English shipping, and with the support of a large amphibious operation from Flushing, started his advance to the coast. The Spaniards, with the Army of Flanders ready, strengthened their positions along the coast, leading to the Battle of Nieuwpoort. Although the Dutch army led by Maurice of Nassau had driven a Spanish army from the field, a rare feat in the 16th century, the casualties on both sides were practically equal, and the battle achieved nothing. The Dutch lines of communication had already been stretched to the limit, and Maurice was forced to withdraw as well. Moreover, the great port of Dunkirk, which had been the principal objective of Maurice's campaign, lay out of reach and in Spanish hands.

The siege of Rees of 1599 was the last action of the campaign of Don Francisco de Mendoza, Admiral of Aragon, of 1598–99, also called the Spanish Winter of 1598–99 (Invierno Español de 1598-99 in Spanish).

== See also ==
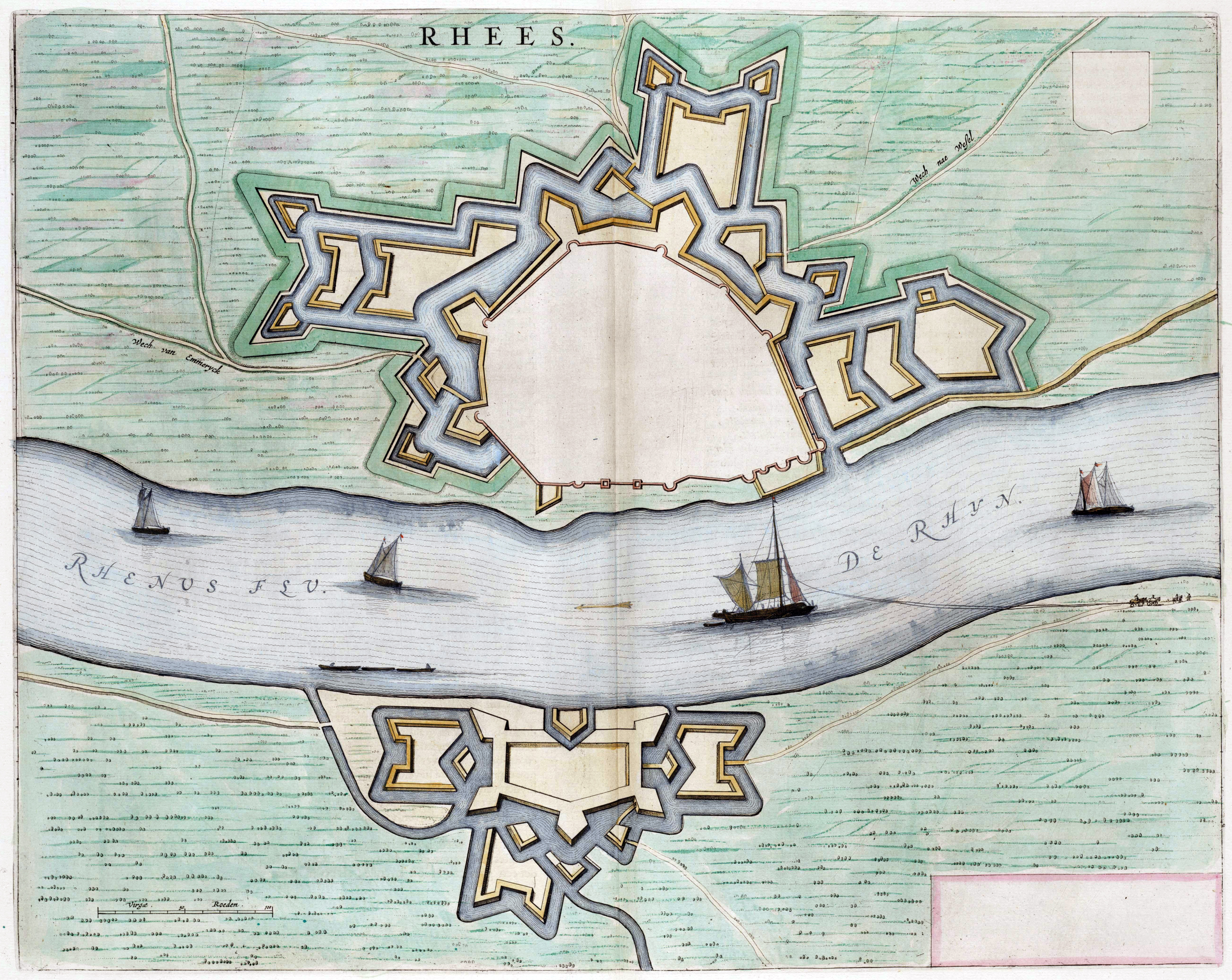
Map of Rees in 1649. Atlas van Loon.

- Siege of Oldenzaal (1597)
- Battle of Nieuwpoort
- Siege of 's-Hertogenbosch (1601)
- Siege of Ostend
- Lower Saxon Circle
- List of governors of the Spanish Netherlands
