= Aumund (company) =

AUMUND Fördertechnik GmbH | AUMUND GROUP
- Type: GmbH
- Founded: 1922
- Founder: Heinrich Aumund
- Headquarters: Rheinberg, North Rhine-Westfalia,, Germany
- Area served: Worldwide
- Key people: Dr.-Ing. Pietro de Michieli (Managing Director ǀ CEO) Reiner Furthmann (Managing Director ǀ CTO) Oliver Lozic (Managing Director ǀ CFO)
- Products: conveying technology products
- Number of employees: 500+ worldwide (AUMUND Group)
- Website: www.aumund.com

AUMUND Fördertechnik GmbH, commonly known as AUMUND, is a German producer of conveying technology and is headquartered in Rheinberg, district of Millingen. The company was founded in 1922 by Professor Heinrich Aumund.

AUMUND Fördertechnik GmbH is part of the AUMUND Group. The AUMUND Group is operating in over 150 countries and has more than 500 employees.

== Foundation and History ==
Prof. Dr.-Ing. Heinrich Aumund founded Aumund Fördertechnik GmbH on 3 August 1922 in Berlin. Numerous patents were filed in the field of conveying and transport technology in the course of his research and engineering activity at the Technische Hochschule Danzig, as well as at the Technische Hochschule Berlin (now Technische Universität Berlin), enabling Heinrich Aumund to rapidly develop the company. From 1951 his son Günter-Claus Aumund took over management of the company. In 1957 production was moved to Rheinberg-Millingen. After the death of Günter-Claus Aumund in 1984 the third generation came into force, with Franz-Walter Aumund in charge. The company was expanded worldwide. Already in 1975 the subsidiary “AUMUND do Brasil“ was established in Rio de Janeiro and „AUMUND International“ in Toronto. By 1977 AUMUND had established 14 subsidiaries and main representative offices worldwide. Among these were subsidiaries in Australia, Finland, Greece and South Africa. In 2001 Gustav Schade Maschinenfabrik was acquired by the AUMUND Group, through which Aumund extended its product range with products from the field of bulk materials and storage technology. One year later the British company B&W was acquired. B&W is specialised in bulk material mobile loading and unloading equipment. Aumund said farewell to crane technology, once a core competence, in 1995. In 1984 the company was officially honoured by Federal President Karl Carstens for its “exemplary service to young people’s professional training“. In 2006 the Franz-W. Aumund Foundation was established which awards Heinrich-Aumund-Scholarships to students at the TU Berlin as well as at the Fachhochschule Koblenz with excellent study achievements related to design and conveying technology.

== Products ==
AUMUND offers the whole range of conveying technology.

- Vertical chain bucket elevators for the transport of difficult and hot materials
- Vertical belt bucket elevators for the conveying of fine materials
- Apron conveyors and complete cement clinker transport systems
- Heavy-duty apron conveyors for raw material handling
- Apron weigh-feeders for controlled mill feeding
- Silo discharge systems
- Special silo clearing systems for cement clinker
- Stacker and Reclaimers - Linear and Circular

== Literature ==
- Heinrich Coopmann: Aumund - Three Generations, three emphases. Rheinberg 2004.
