= Orsoy, Germany =

Orsoy
- Borough of Rheinberg
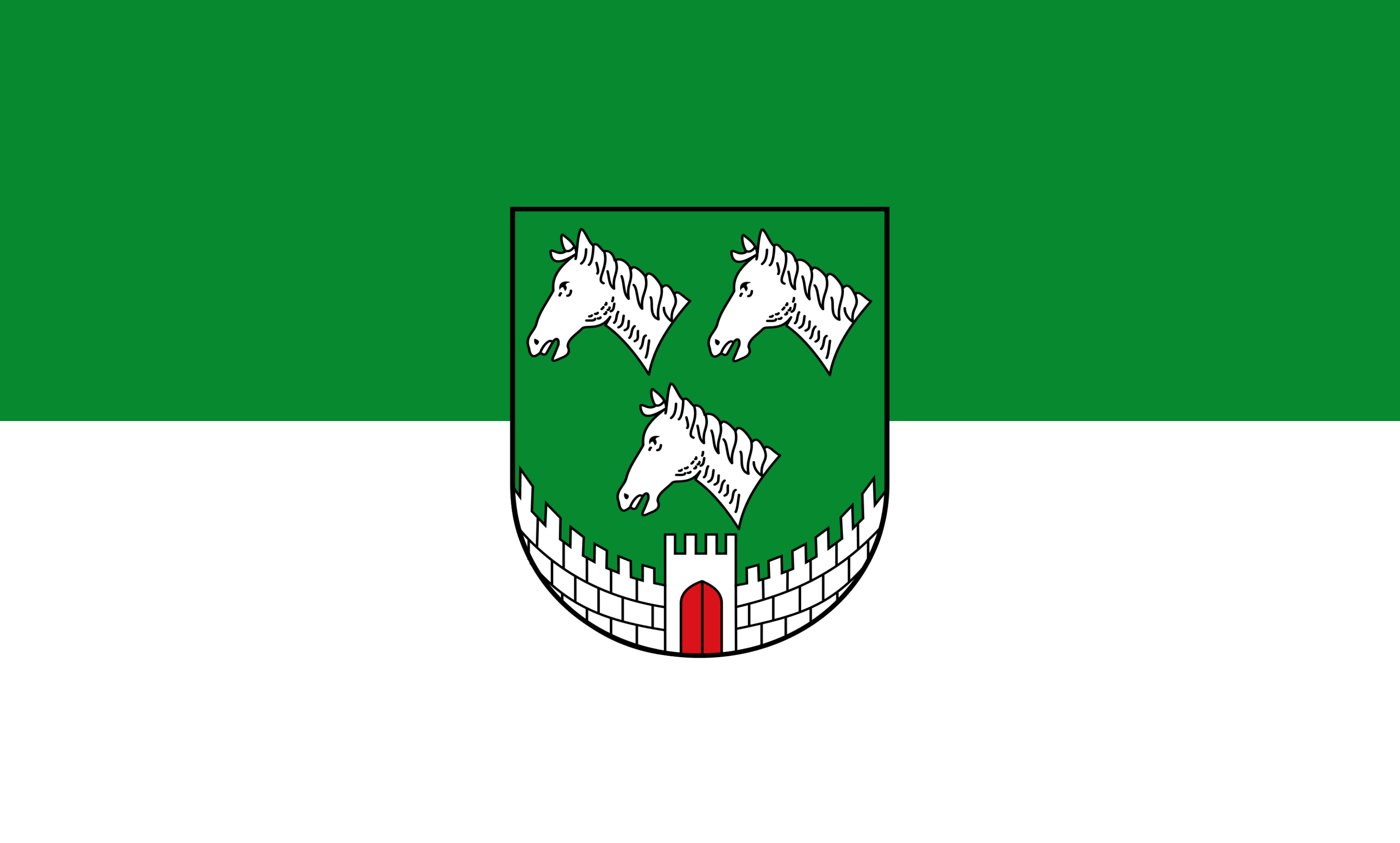
- Flag Coat of arms

- The borough of Orsoy within the town of Rheinberg.
- Interactive map of Orsoy
- Location within Germany Location within North Rhine-Westphalia
- Coordinates: 51°31′28″N 6°41′12″E
- Country: Germany
- State: North Rhine-Westphalia
- District: Wesel
- Town: Rheinberg

Area
  - Total: 14.75 km^{2} (5.70 sq mi)
- Elevation: 20 m (66 ft)

Population (2021)
  - Total: 4,192
  - Density: 284.2/km^{2} (736.1/sq mi)
- Time zone: UTC+01:00 (CET)
  - Summer (DST): UTC+02:00 (CEST)
- Postal codes: 47495
- Dialling codes: 02844

Orsoy (German pronunciation: [ˈɔʁzaʊ]), from approximately 1273 to 1974 an independent town, most recently within the Kreis Moers district, is today a district (officially a residential area) and one of four boroughs of the North Rhine-Westphalian town of Rheinberg on the left bank of the Lower Rhine in the Kreis Wesel district.

The word Orsoy, pronounced Oschau or Orsau means "horse pasture" (Rossaue). Orsoy itself was in the Middle Ages a powerful fortified town with high walls and four gates. Although much of the fortifications were destroyed by Louis XIV in 1672 and some remains later in the Second World War, a tower, circa 50 percent of the walls and part of the moat remain today giving some indication of the scale of the fortifications.

The borough of Orsoy includes the Orsoyerberg district, as well as the hamlets of Drießen, Plank, Hasenfeld and Milchplatz.

== History ==
Teutons supplanted the Celtic inhabitants around Orsoy in 750BC and Caesar invaded the area establishing Roman Rule in the 1st century BC. Orsoy was first founded as a Roman Villa on what was the frontier of the empire. By the 4th century a Roman Road and ferry crossing had been established at Orsoy.

In 401AD the Romans withdraw from the area in the face of the Visigoths and the Franks followed close behind. In 1938 archaeologists uncovered 9 royal tombs from 500 to 630AD showing strong Scandinavian cultural input.

The town became Frankish and was Christianised about 700 AD.

The earliest mention of the town is in a charter for nearby Hamborn Abbey in 1139.

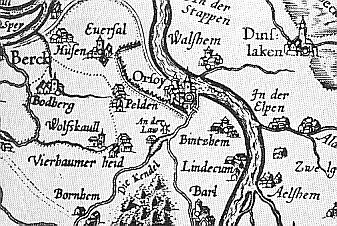
Orsoy 1591

It is then mentioned in a deed of Count Dietrich IV of Kleve of 1233. From 1238 to 1240, Orsoy was used as a River Toll Station for the count of Kleve. His heir Dietrich V of Cleves,(1260-1275)) granted it town status in 1263 or 1270. There was a fire in 1347 that left the city in ruins, so it was refounded on September 1, 1347, by Emperor Louis IV. Count Johann von Kleve remained the local lord, and the town was governed by 7 aldermen, although it was never granted market rights. A baliff was granted in 1364 and a grant of a mayor followed soon after.

In 1438 Duke Adolf of Cleves had built a second castle and in 1452 records show a teacher (schoolmaster) hired by the town. The town moat was completed in 1461.

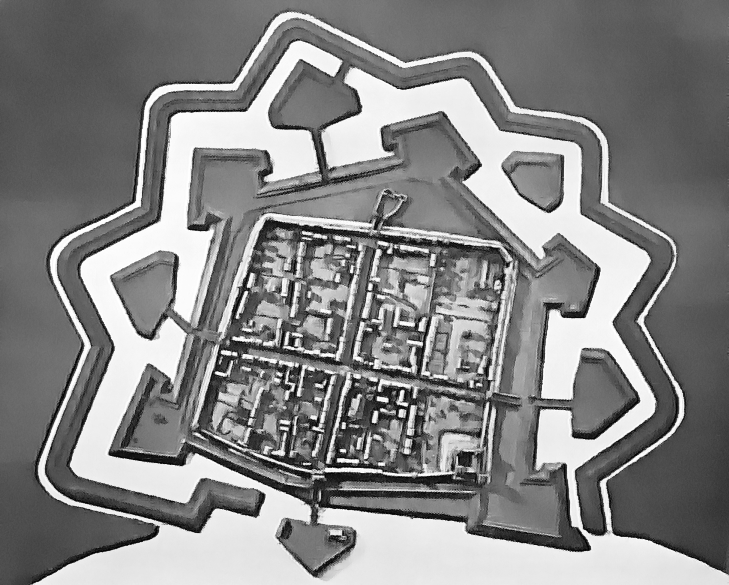
Plan of town in 1650

The modern fortress was built 1565-1581 by Italian Johann Pasqualini Elder (Responsible for the construction of the second ring ) and funded by Duke William the Rich of Cleves. In 1586 the town was conquered by the Spaniards and destroyed.

From 1632 to 1640 the city was under Dutch occupation and the rebuilt fortress was built in the old Dutch style and expanded by the third fixing ring. In 1666 Orsoy once again came under Brandenburg management, until 1672 when there was a period of French rule, when Louis XIV ordered demolition of large parts of the existing fortifications.

In 1685 the first Rhine harbor in Orsoy is established. Rebuilding of the fort took place again in 1750. In the 18th century Orsoy was a site of a significant textile industry. But a fire in 1818 and the Seven Years' War (1756-1763) and the relocation of the Rhine customs duty office to Homberg in 1805 caused the economy to crash.

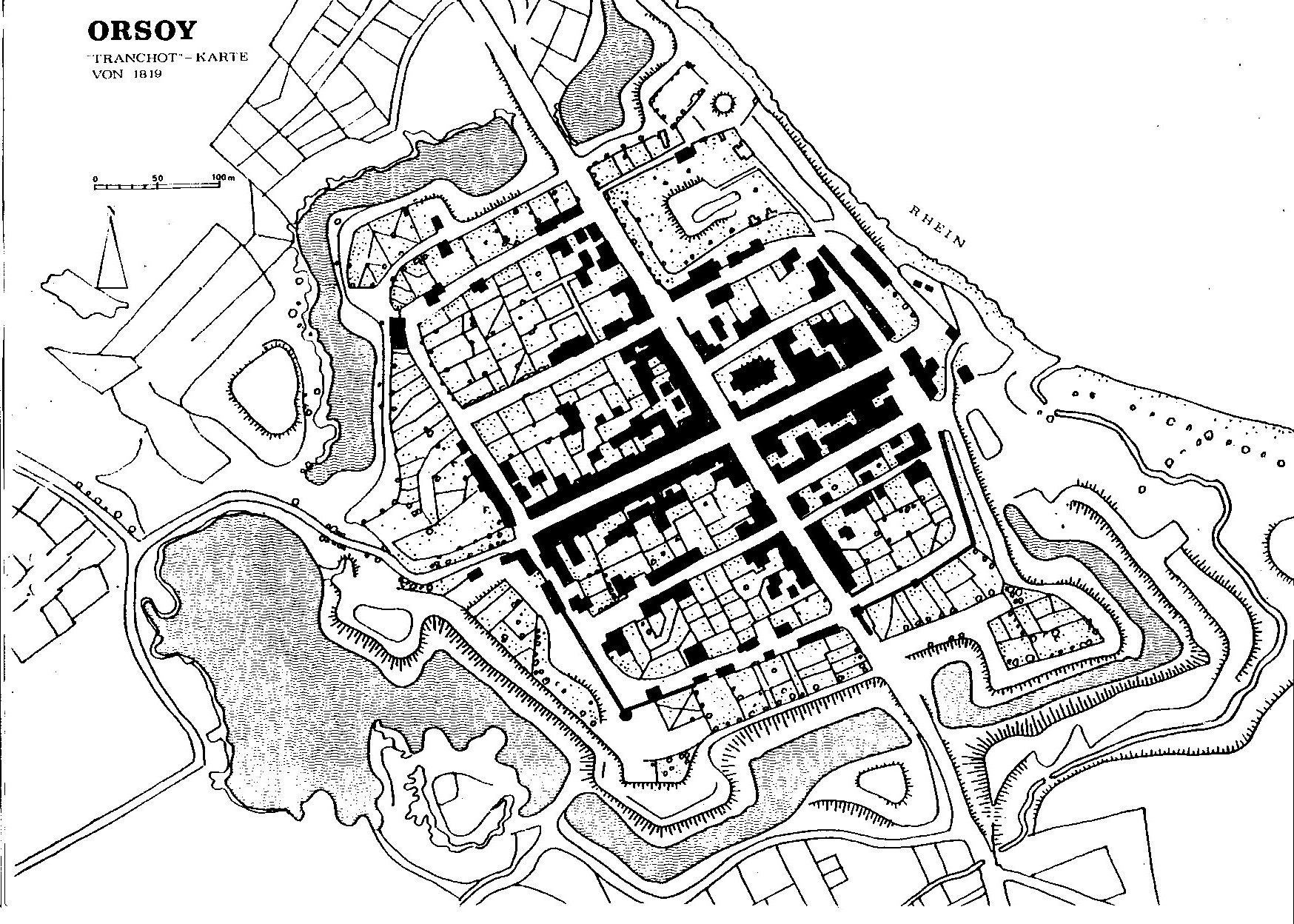
1819 town plan

A recovery began in 1851 with the production of cigars, which remained a staple industry until the Second World War.

In 1935/36 the harbor basin was filled in to facilitate extension to the primary school and extend the river dike.

In 1938 also Orsoyer Jews were expelled from the town and later deported. Towards the end of World War II, in March 1945, Orsoy was occupied by troops of the US Army. During the hostilities the steeple of the Catholic Church was shelled by German troops. The shelling was carried out from the opposite (right) bank of the Rhine. A destruction of the tower a possible use by enemy reconnaissance should be suppressed.

Starting in 1956, missile engineer Berthold Seliger lived in Orsoy. He built a workshop and built here the rocket, which he launched from 1962 to 1964 in the Wadden area of Cuxhaven.

The once thriving tobacco is no longer existent. A large former tobacco factory on Südwall was converted in the 1990s to housing. The most important local supply facilities have been preserved over the years in Orsoy. There is a primary school, two kindergartens, several doctors, a nursing home, two bakeries, a pastry shop, a bank and several smaller shops.

On January 1, 1972, the municipality of Orsoy-Land was incorporated into the town of Rheinberg. The town of Orsoy was added on 1 January 1975.

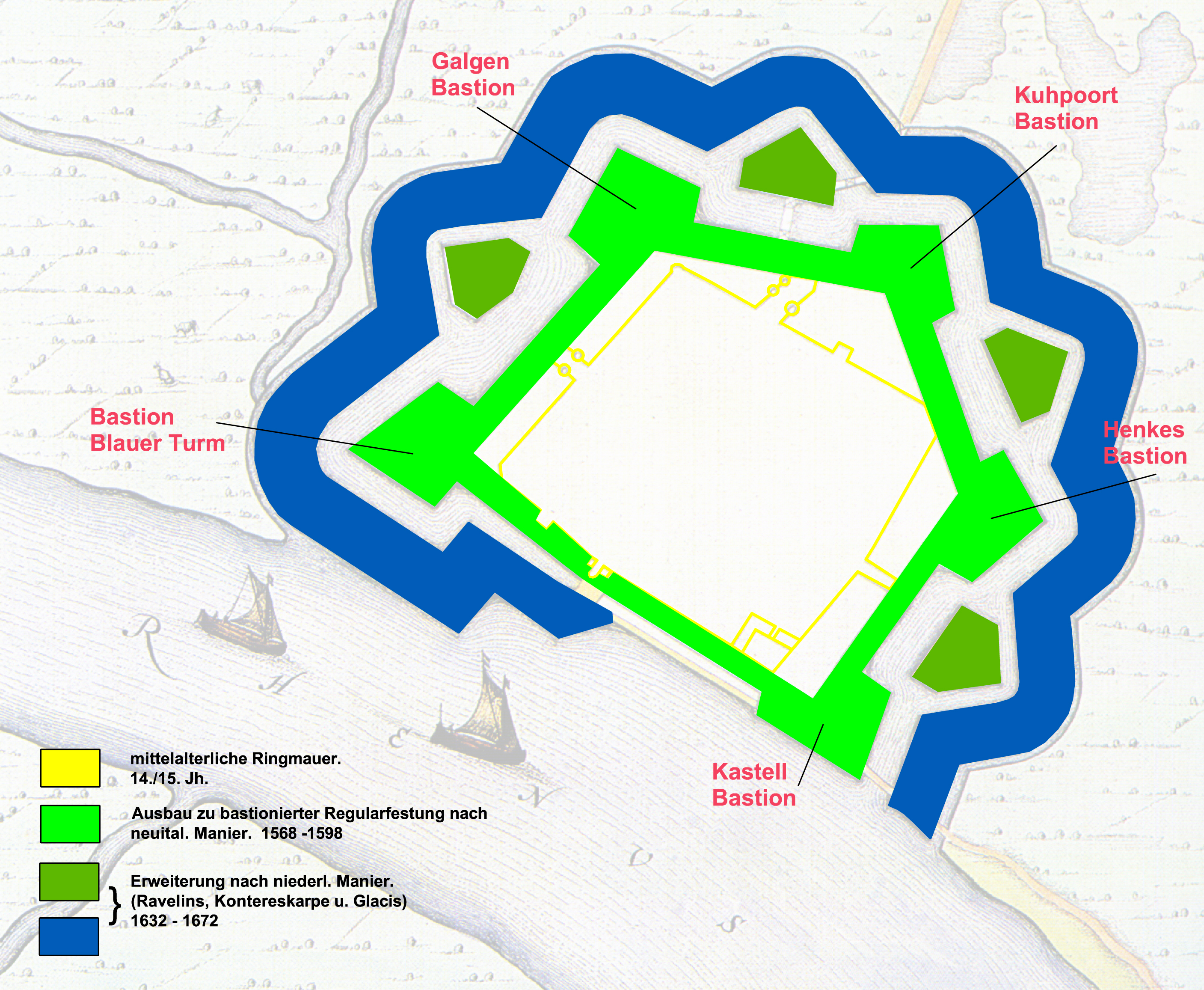
development of the walls at Orsoy

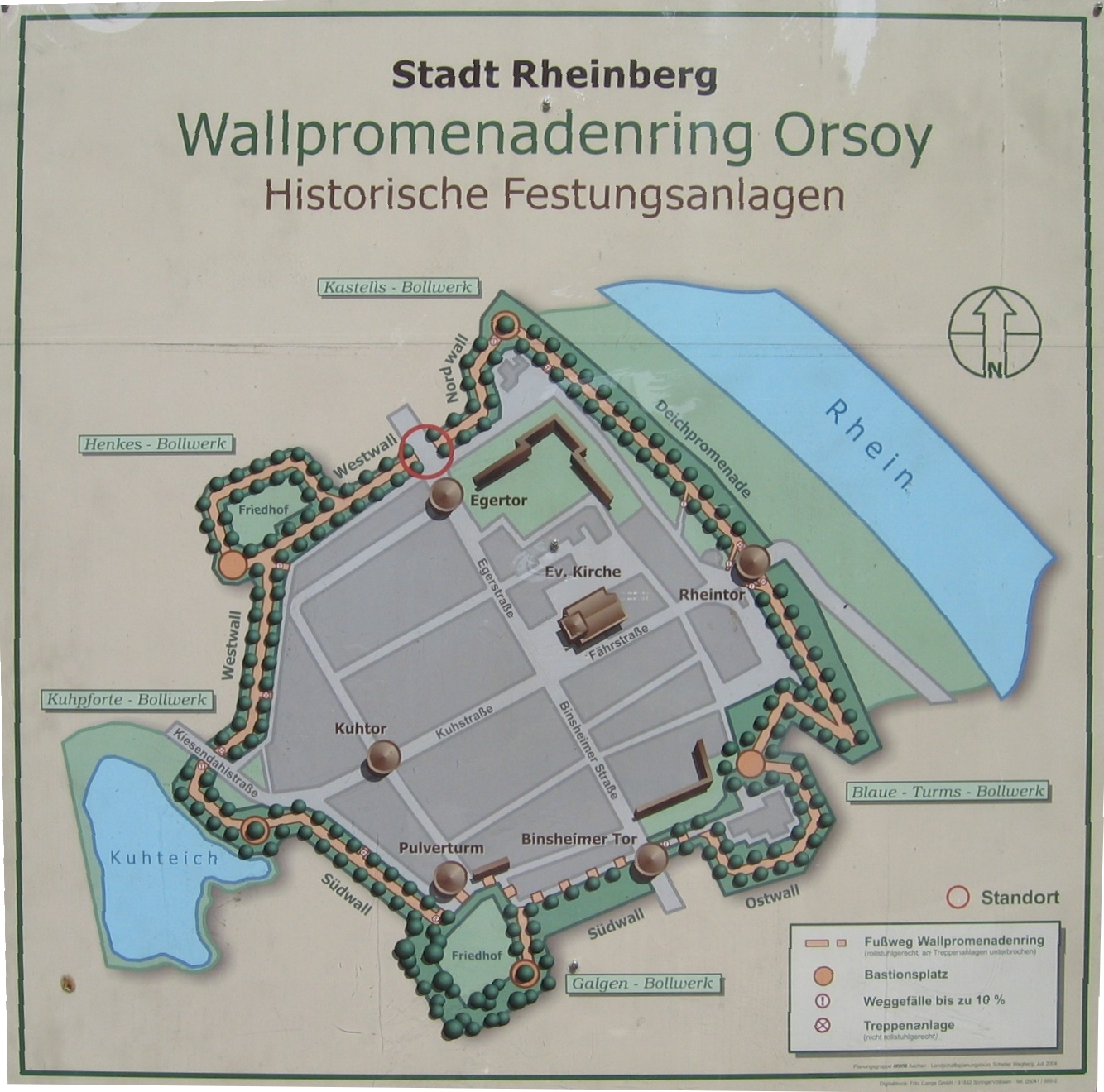
Historische Festungsanlagen: Befestigungsring 1 und 2 (Aktuelle Situation)

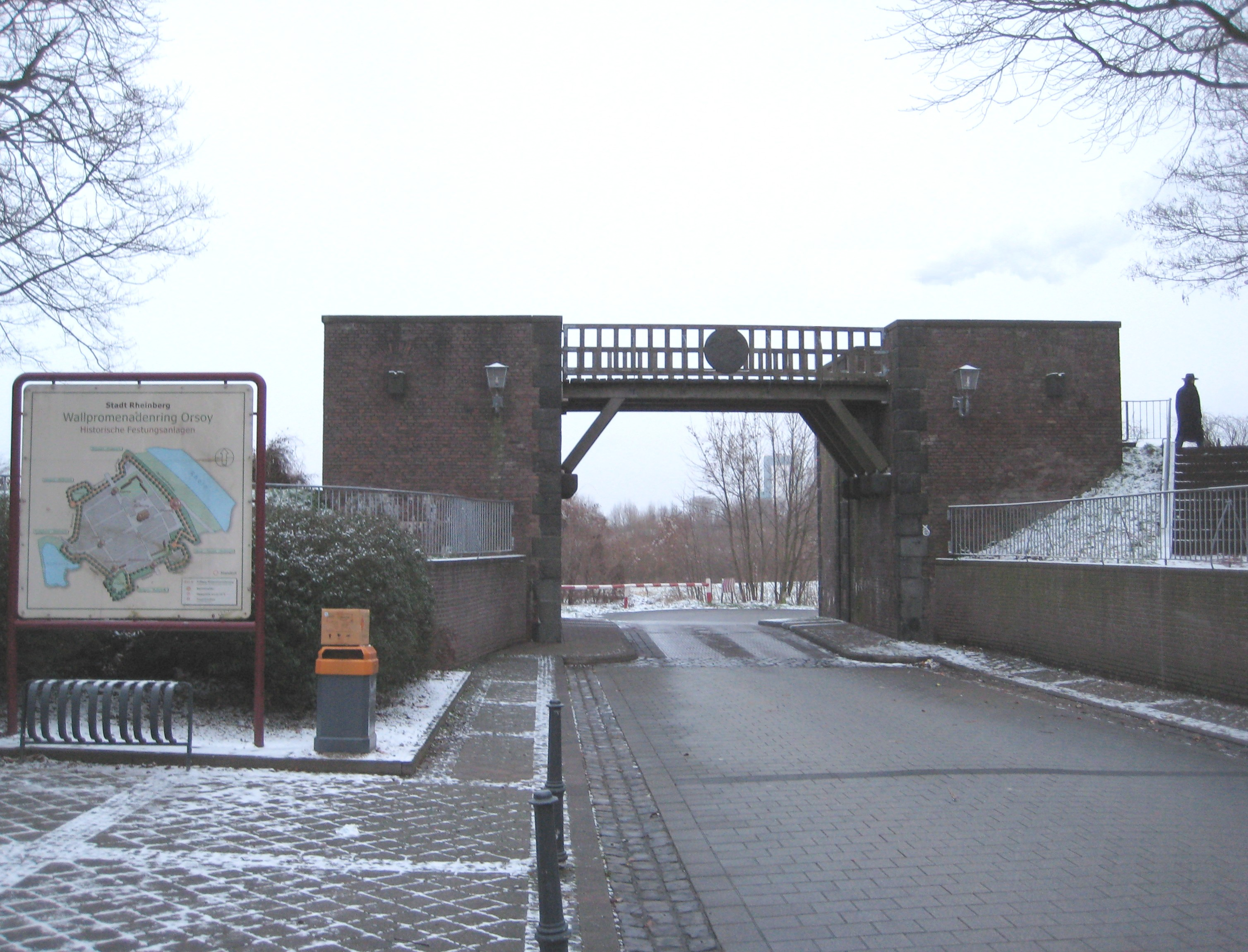
the 1937 gate

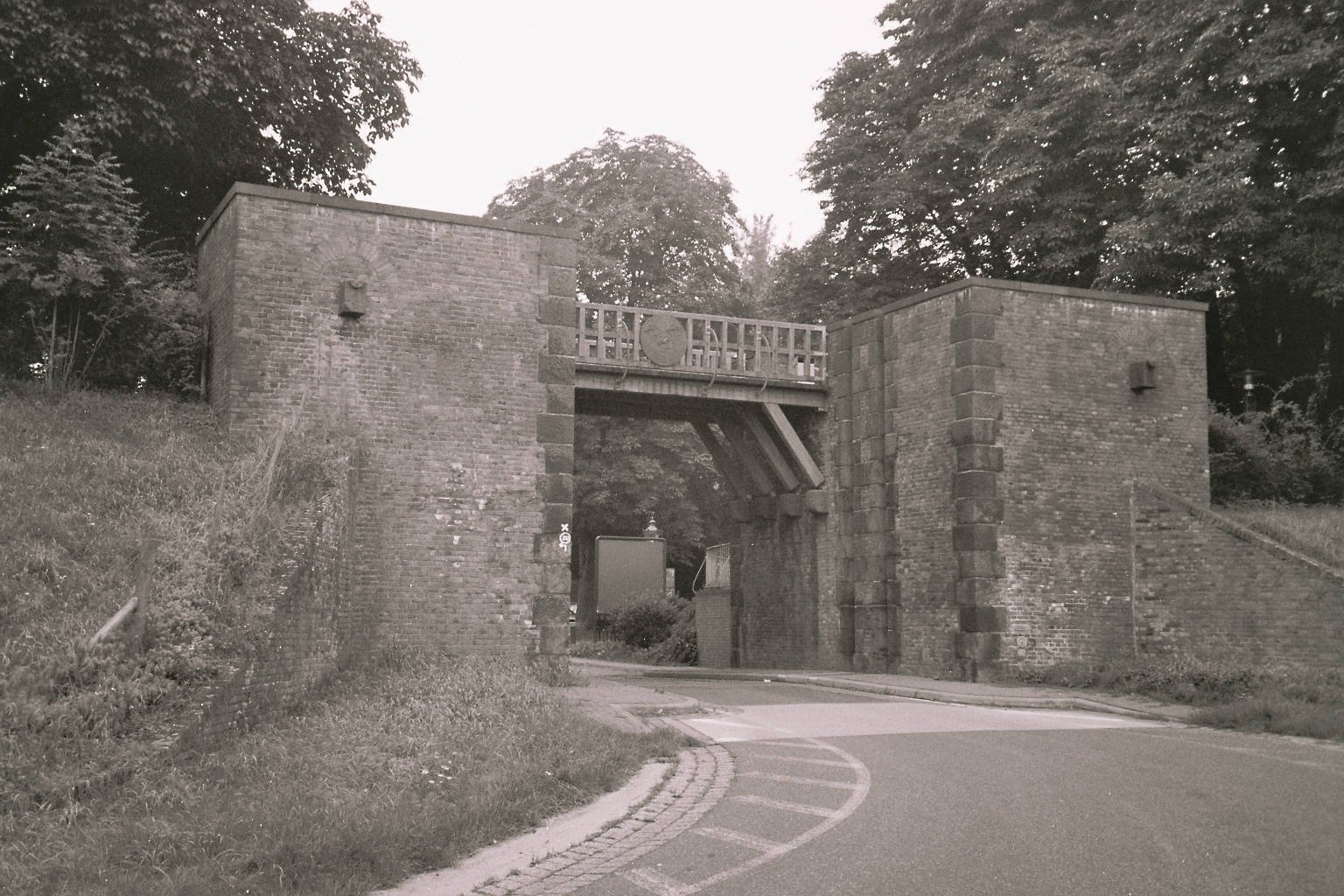
Hochwasserschutztor (Rheinansicht)

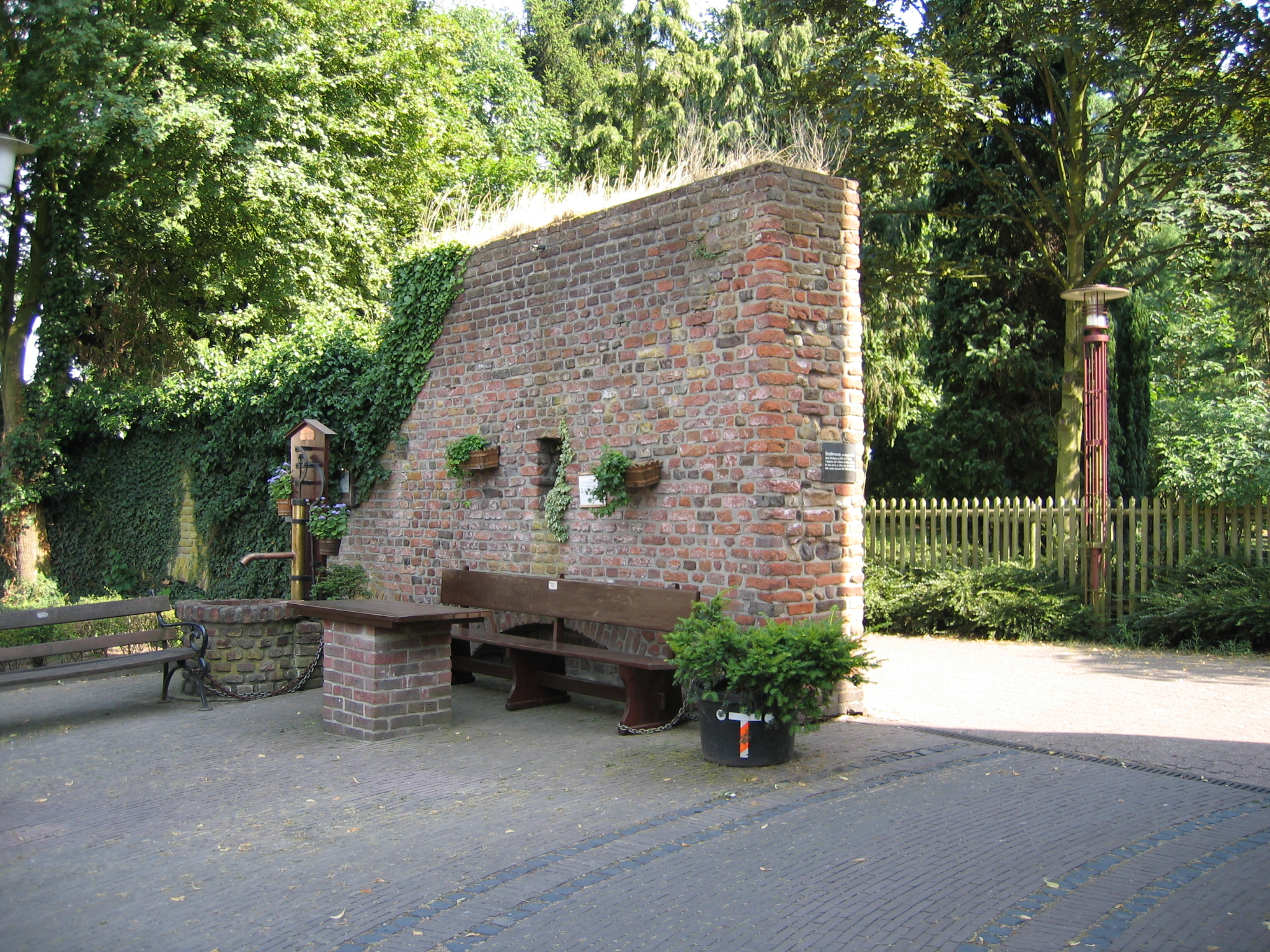
remains of the old town wall

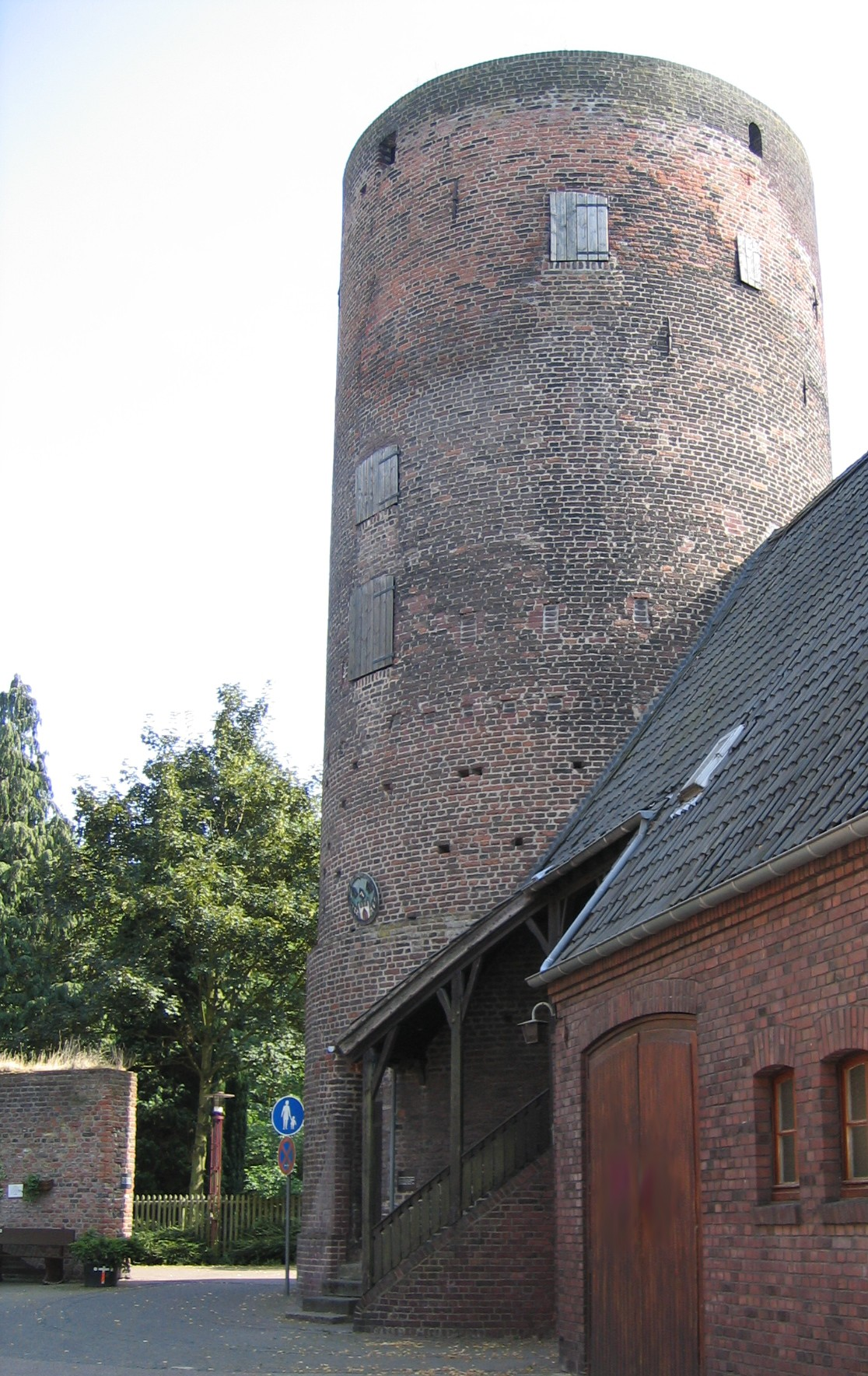
Power tower

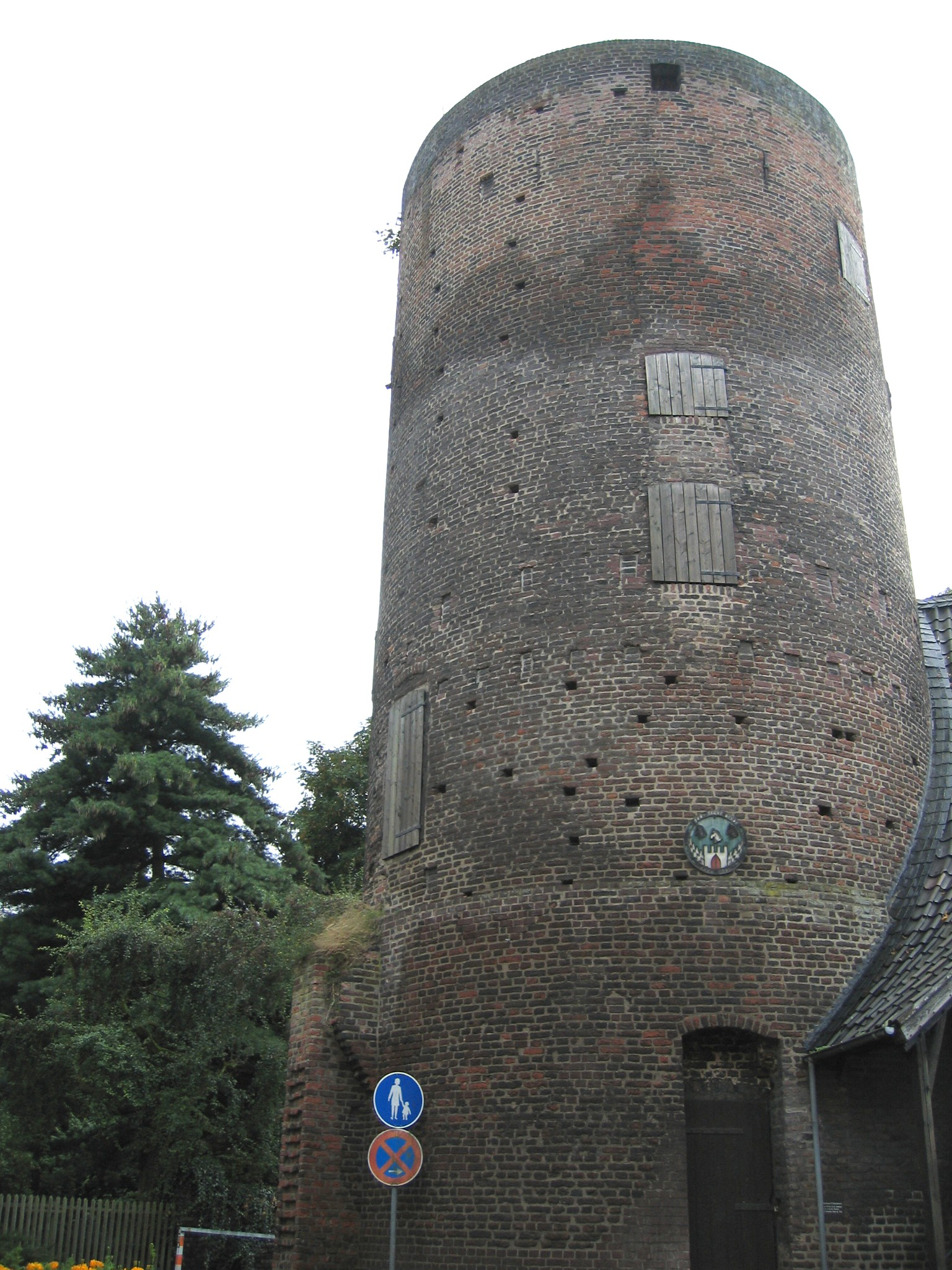
Powder Tower (Ostansicht)

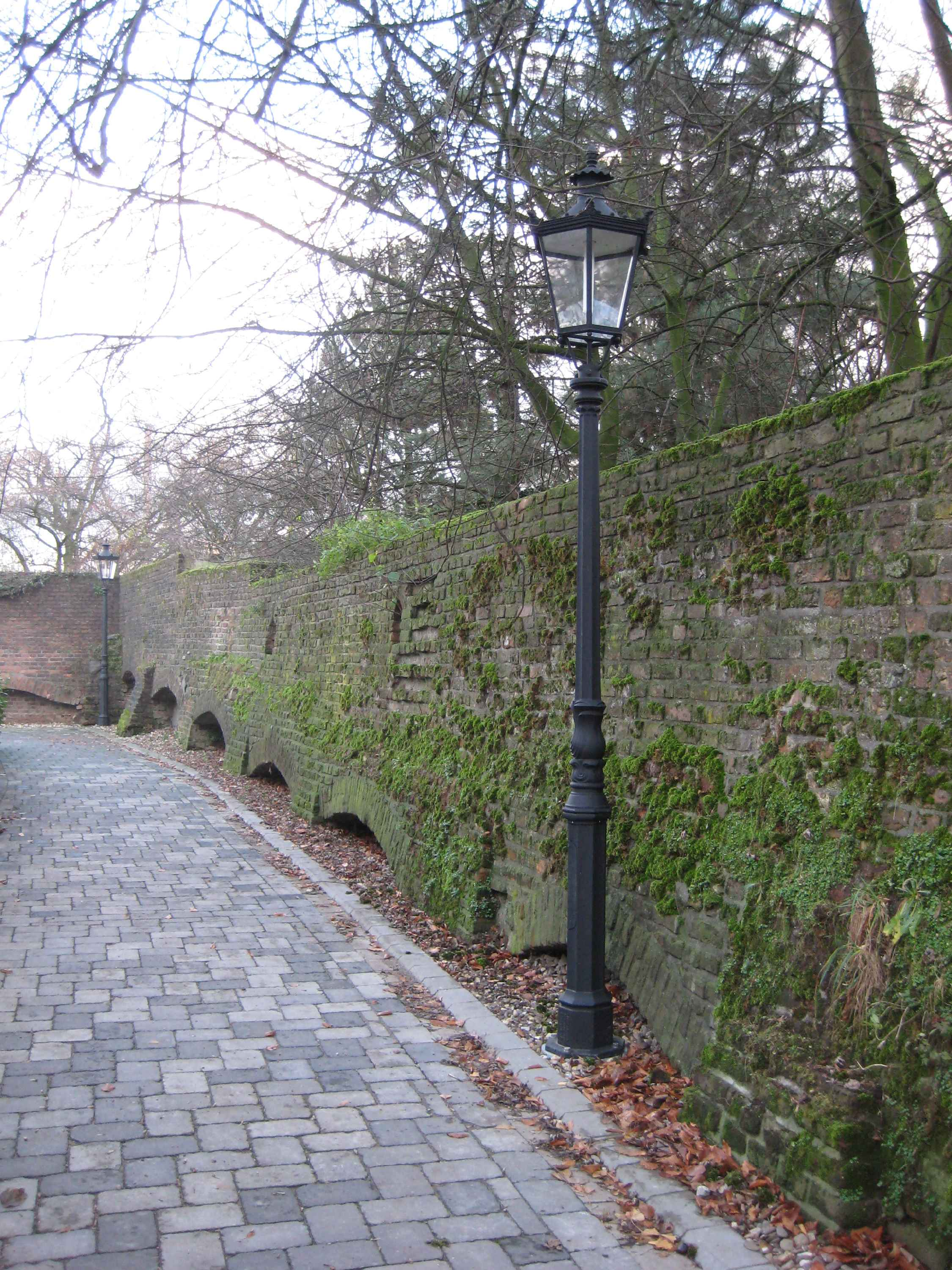
Remains of inner wall

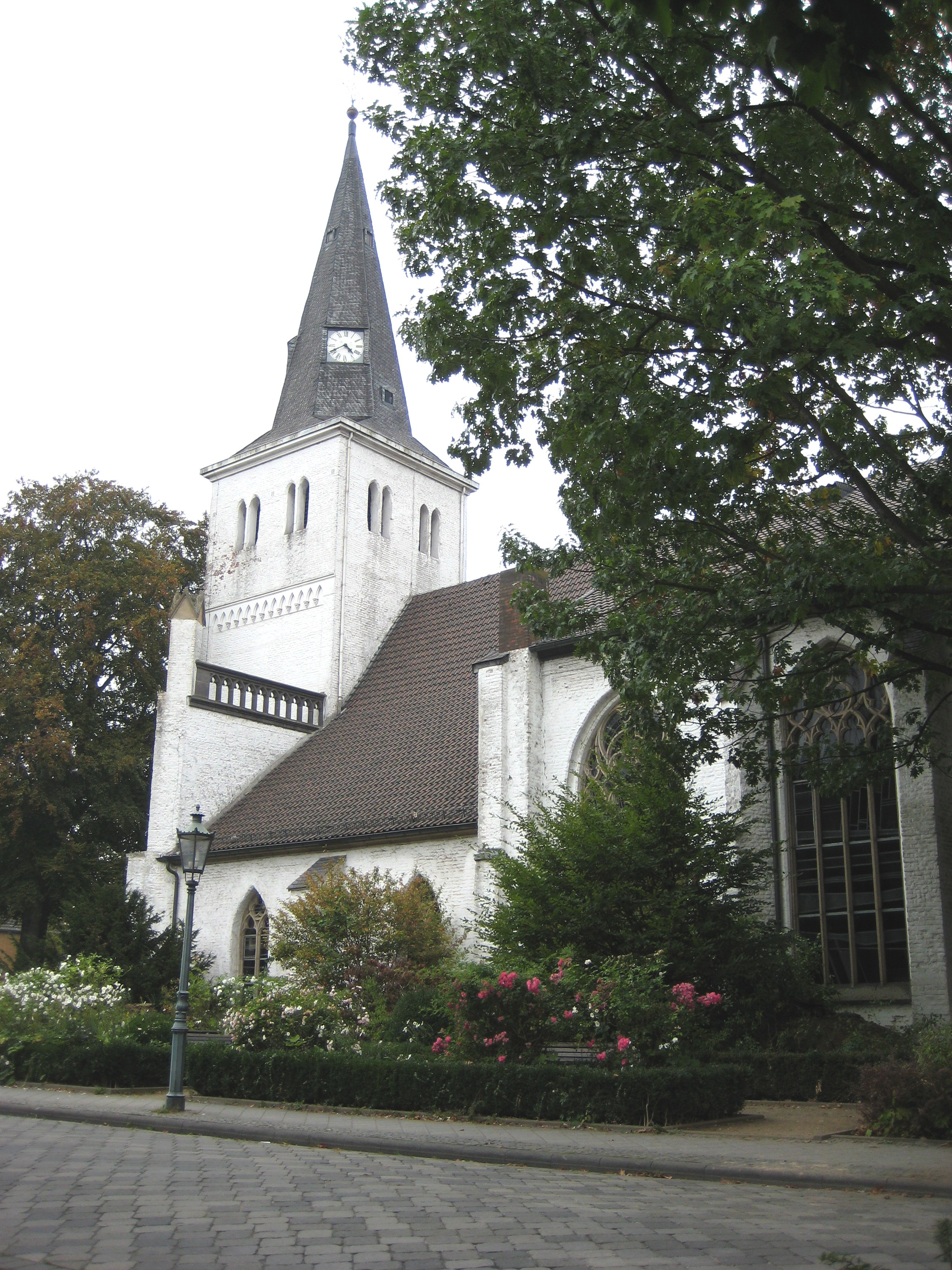
Protestant church

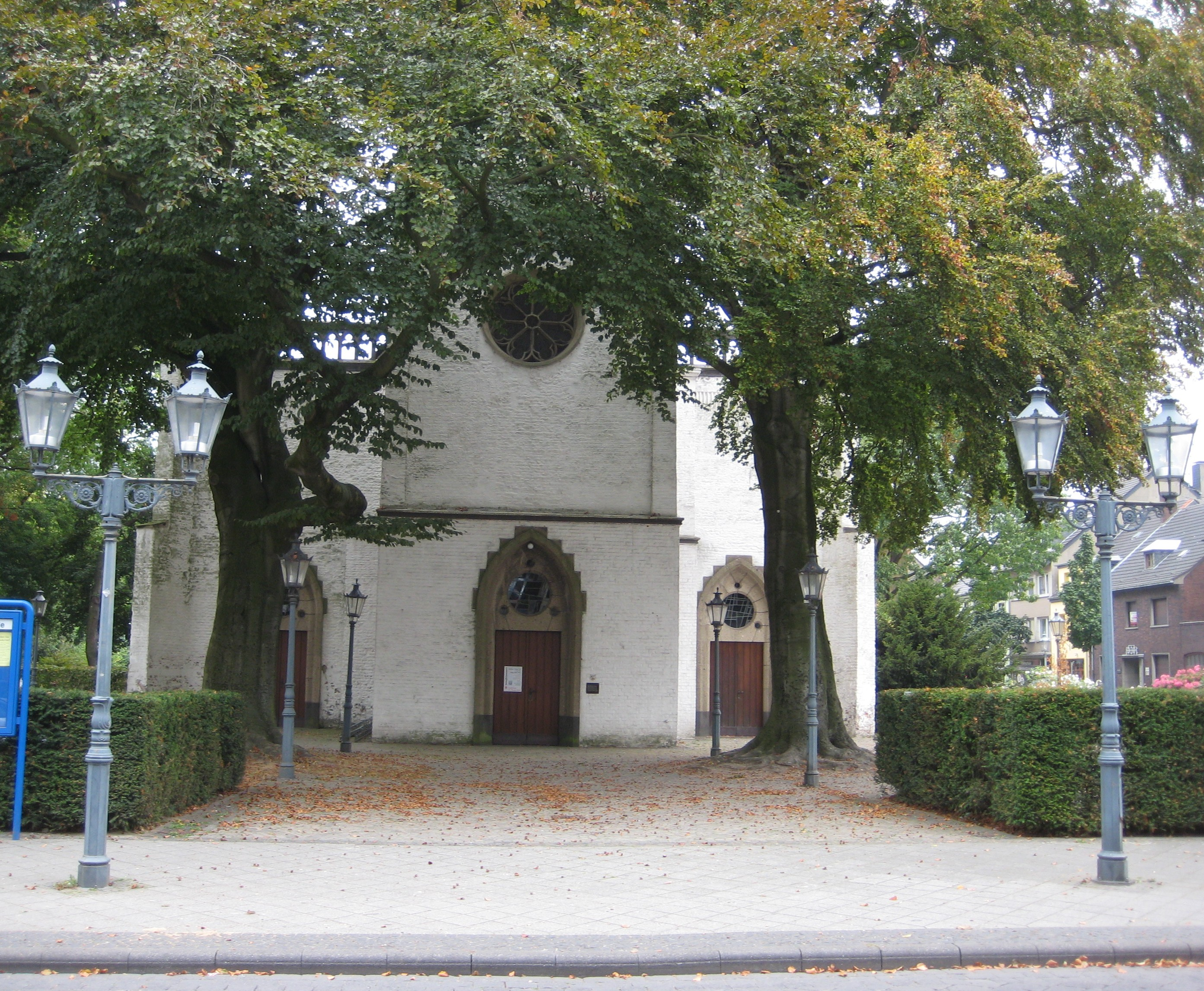
Protestant church

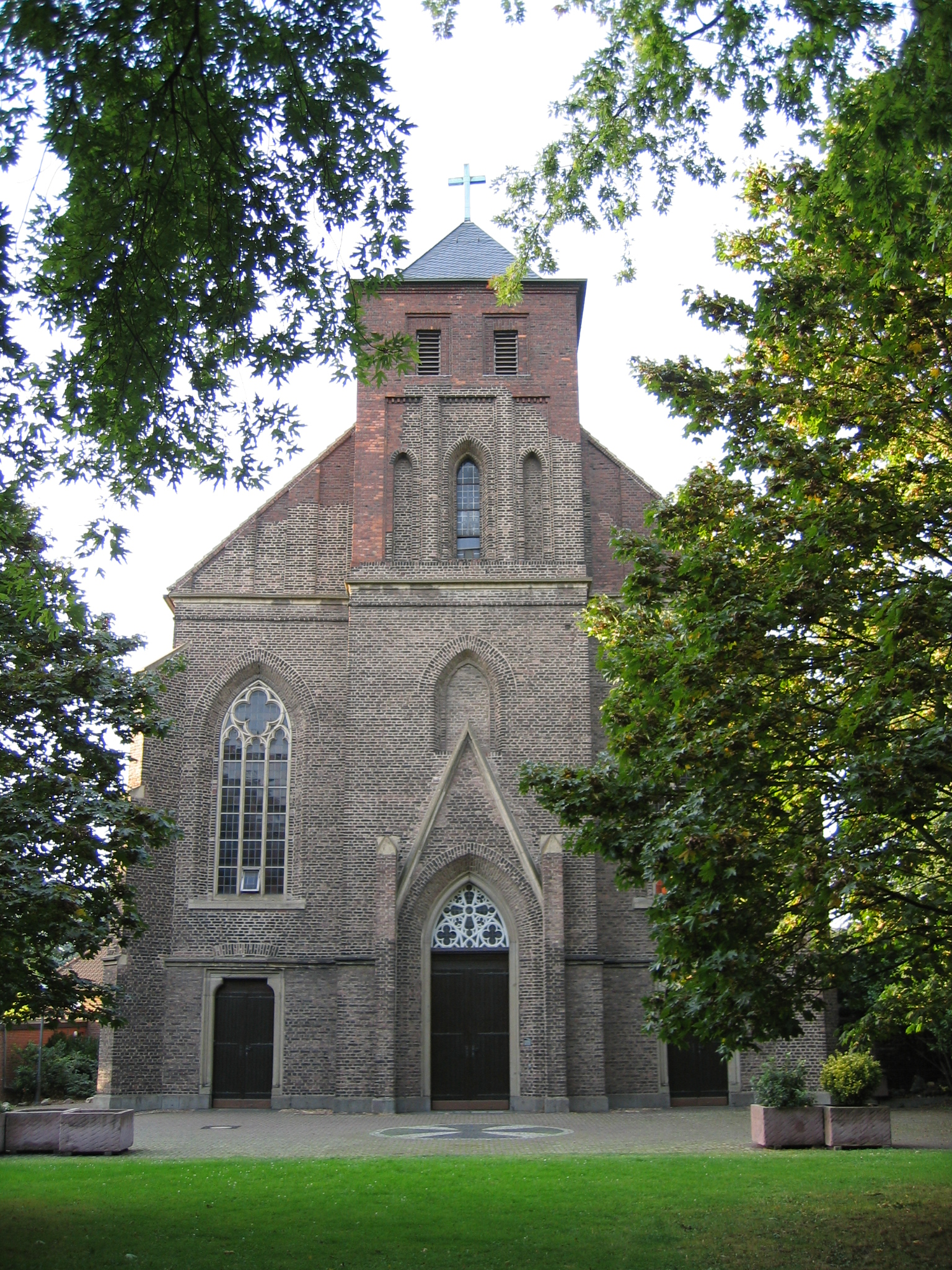
Catholic church

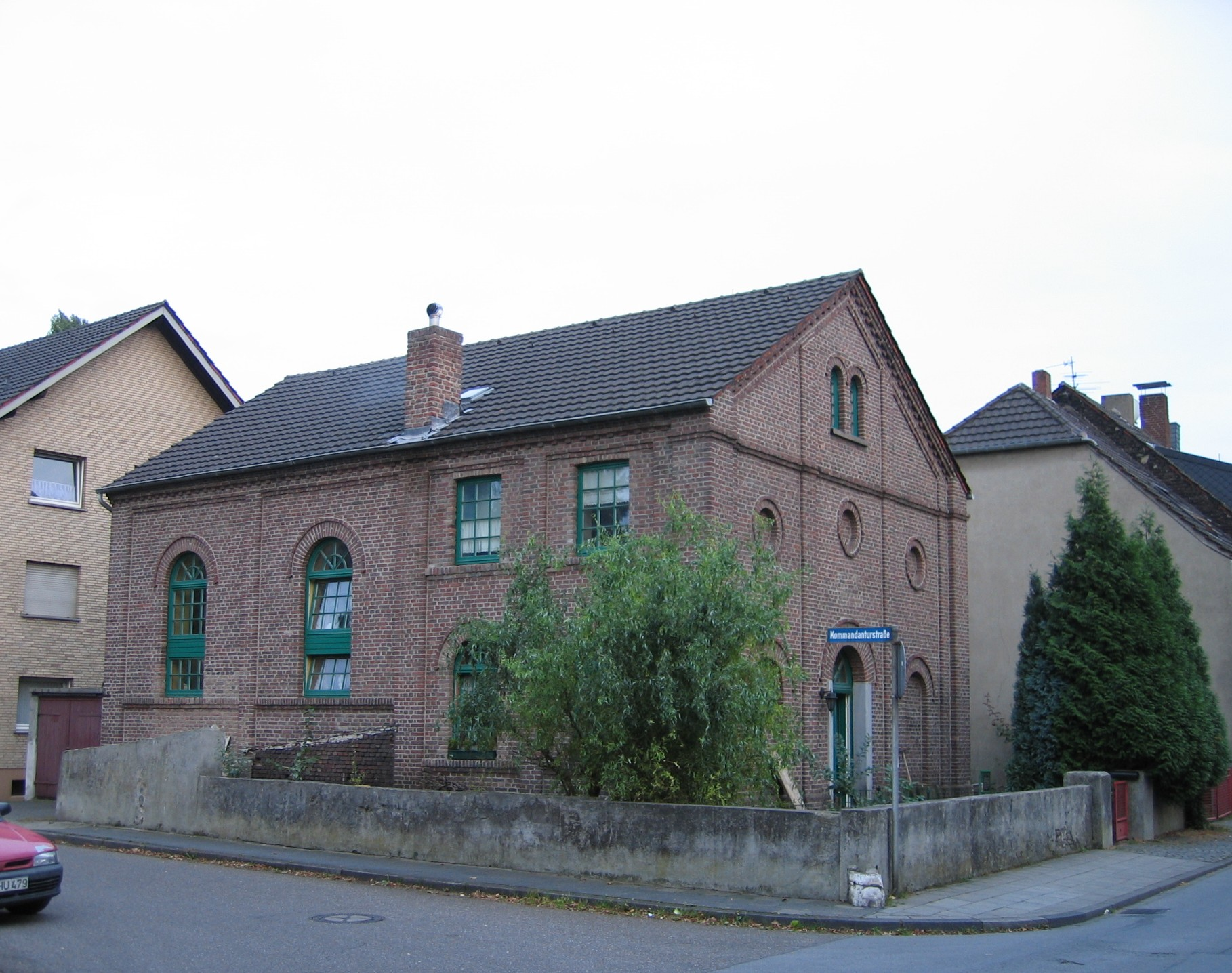
Synagoge

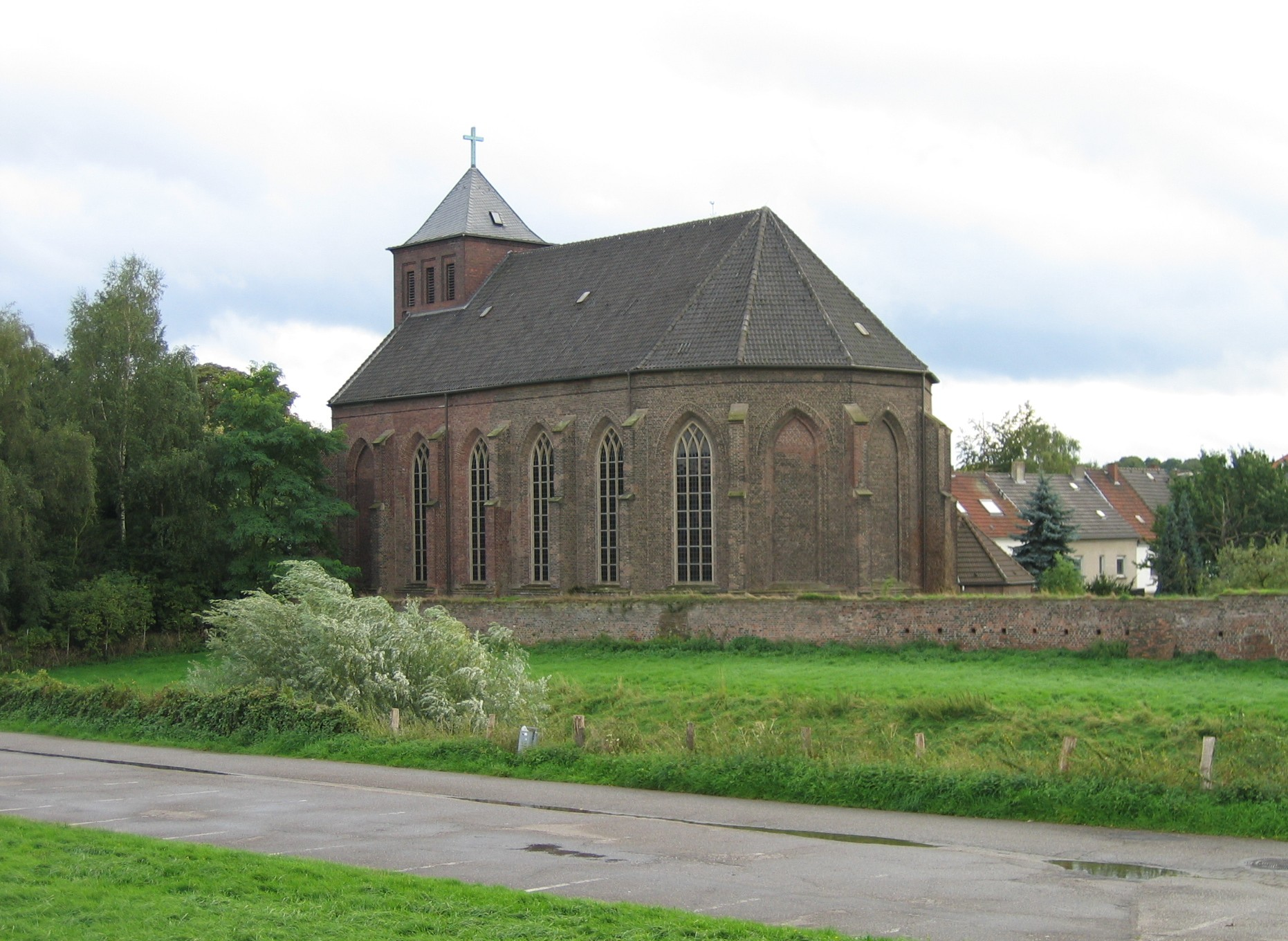
St. Nikolaus catholic church

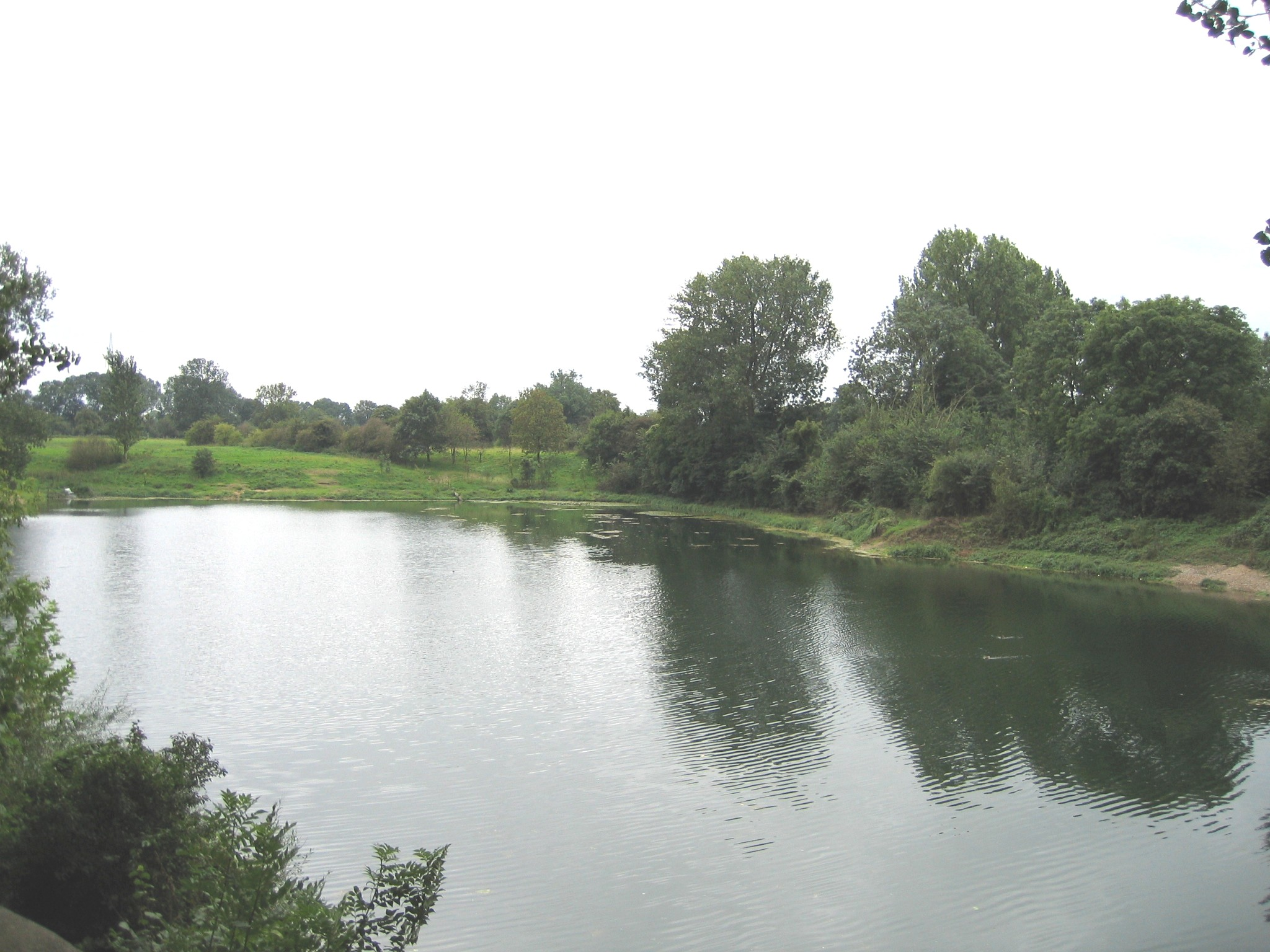
Orsoy moat

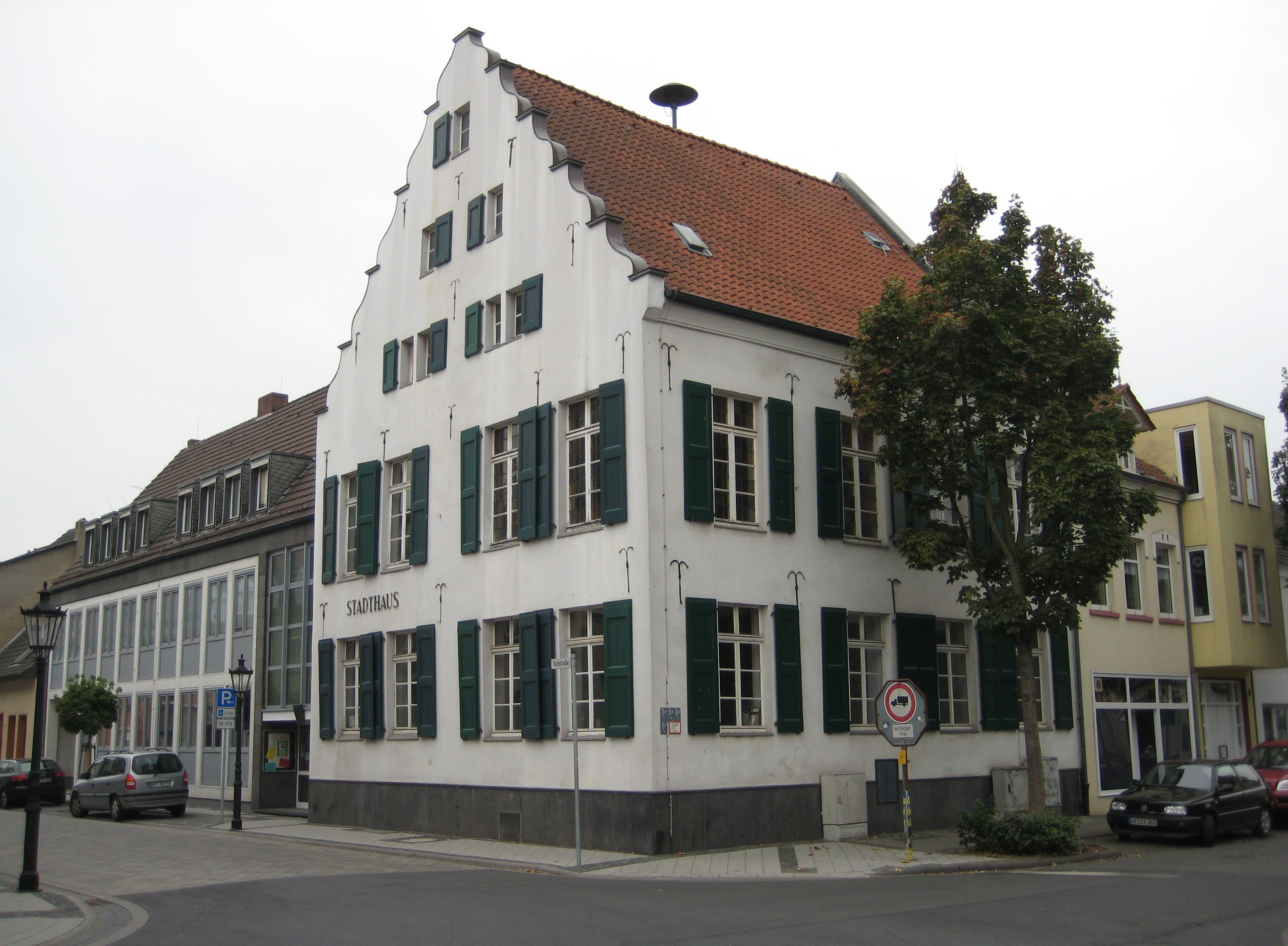
Orsoy Rathaus.

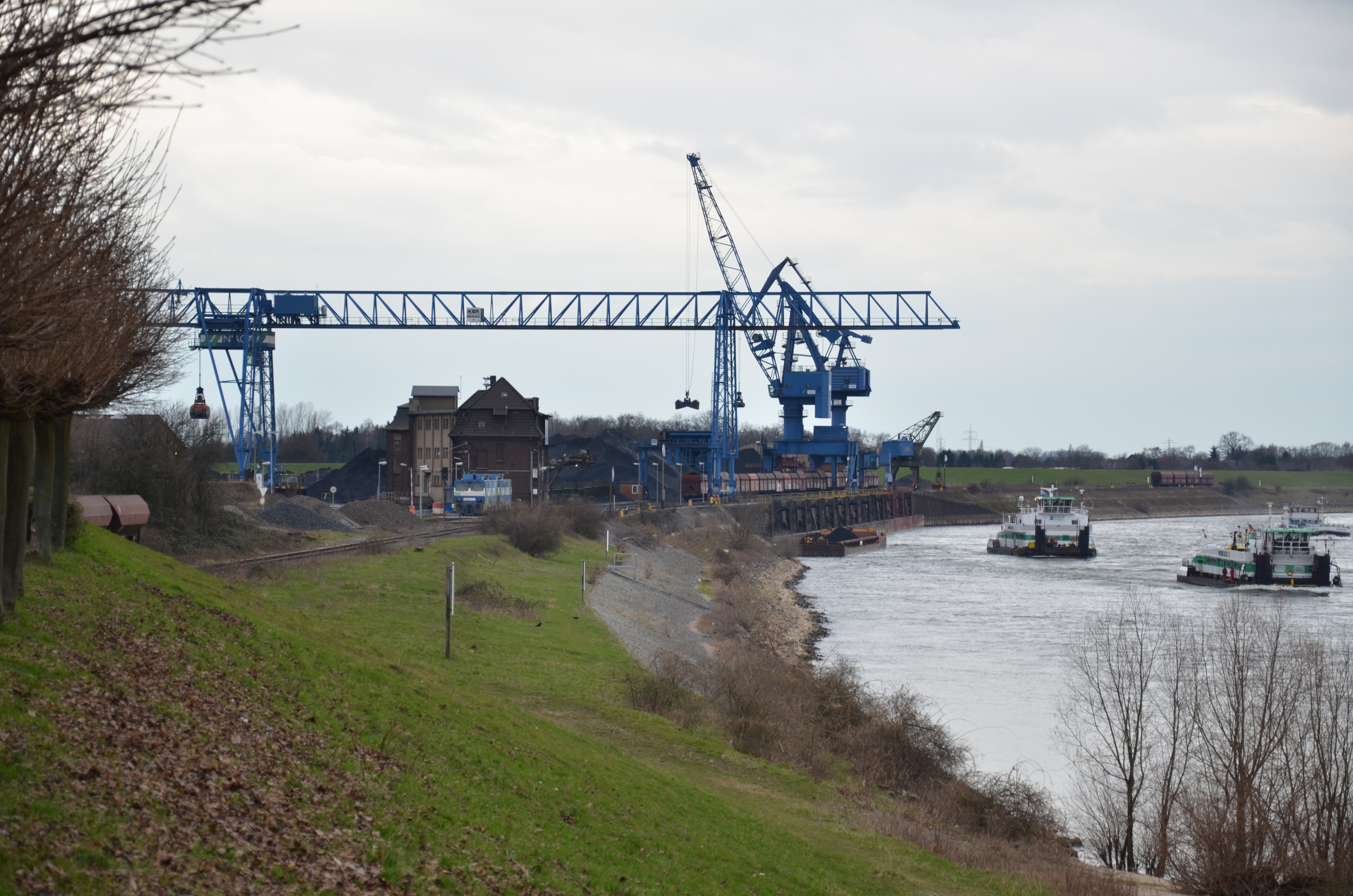
Orsoy River Port

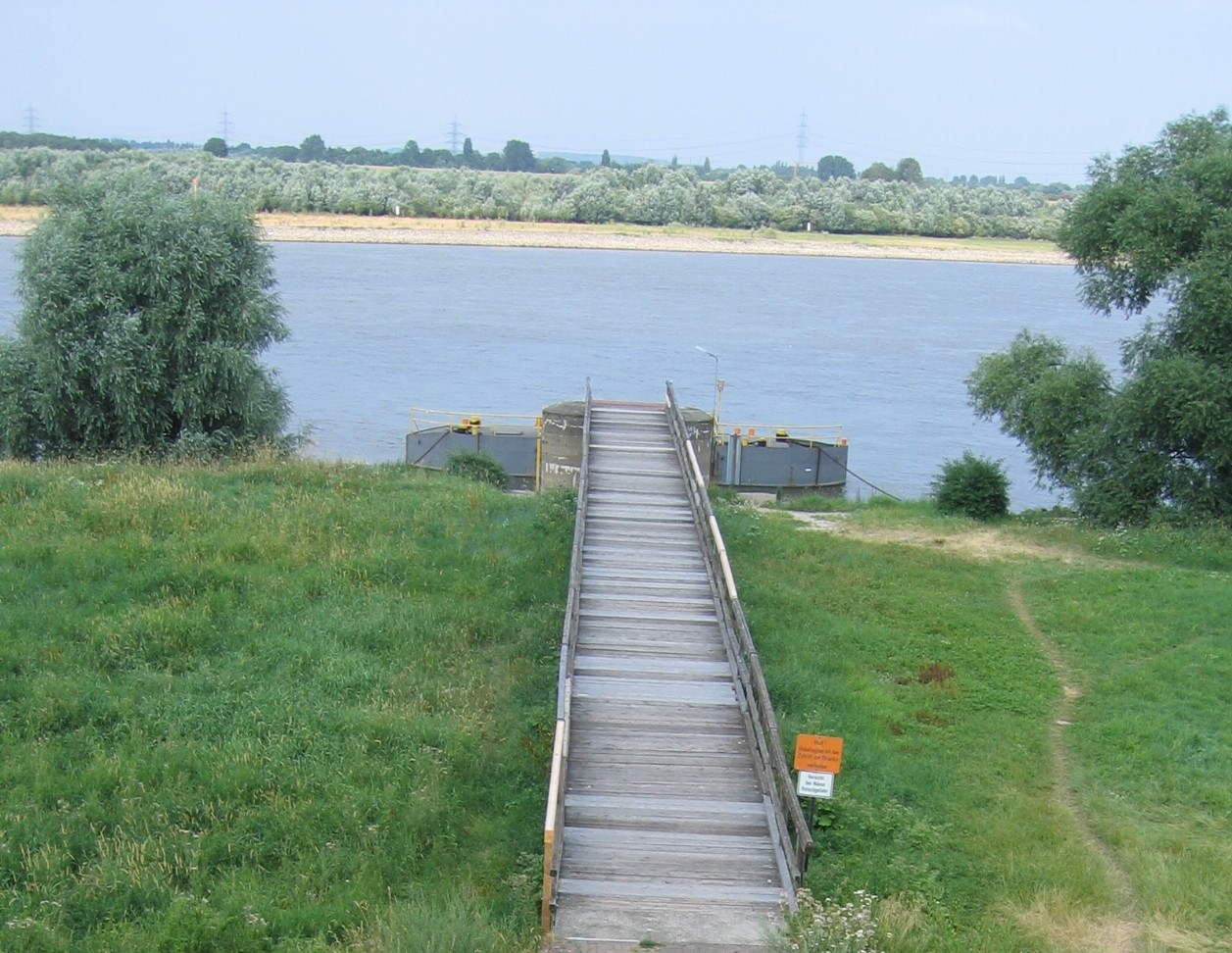
Peirs on the Rhine

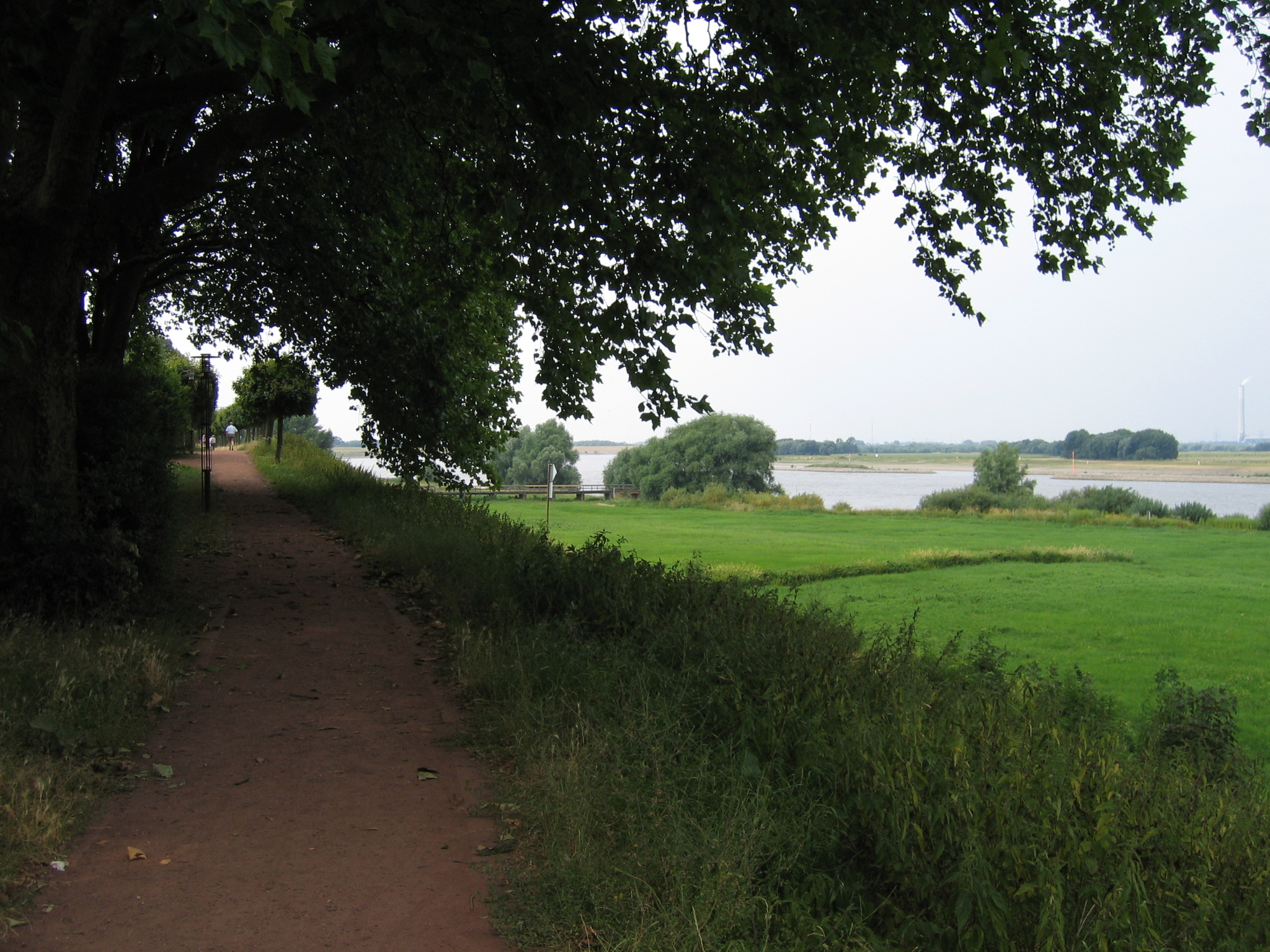
river bank Orsoy

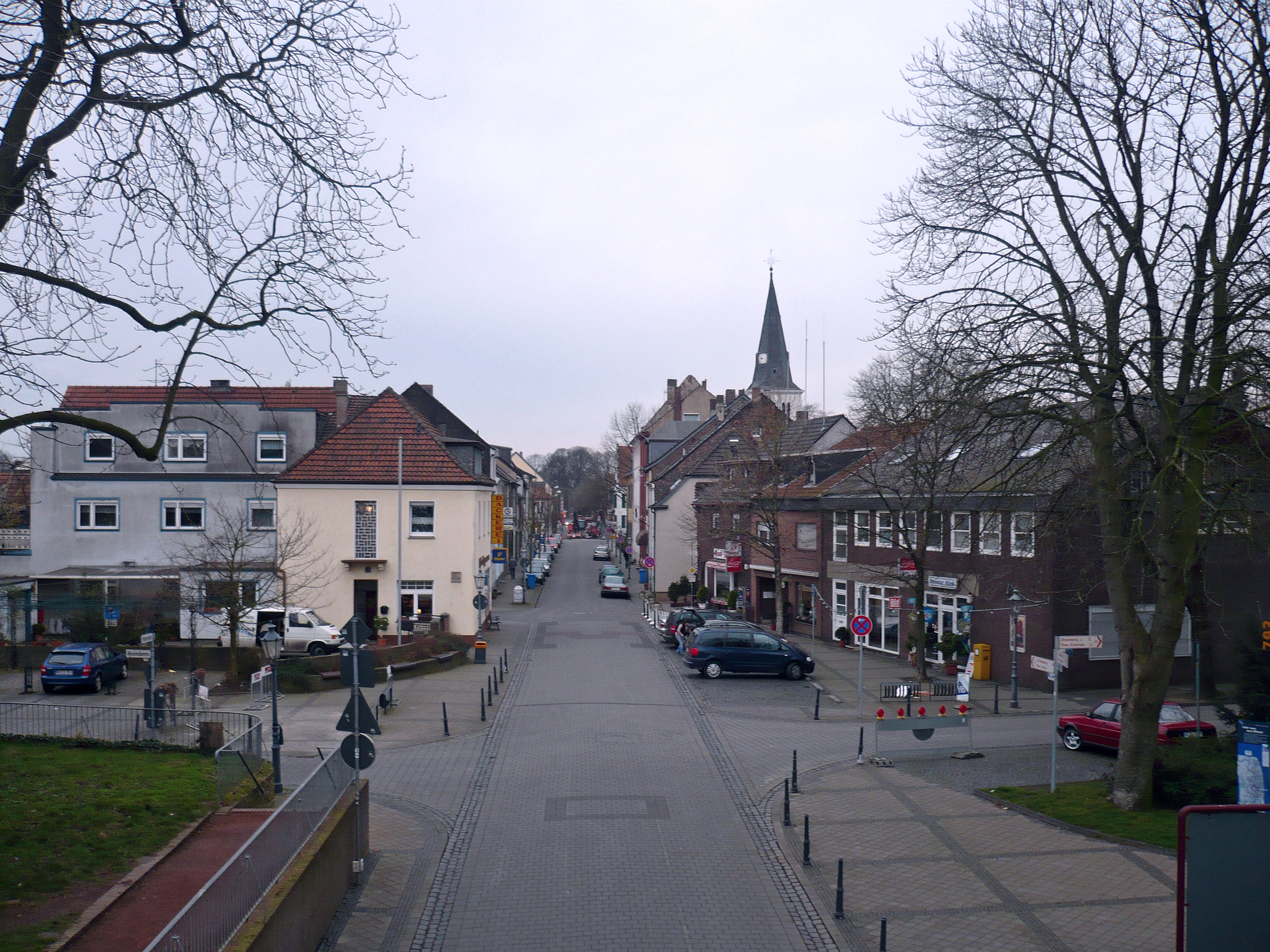
main street Orsoy
