= Alpen, Germany =

Alpen
- Municipality
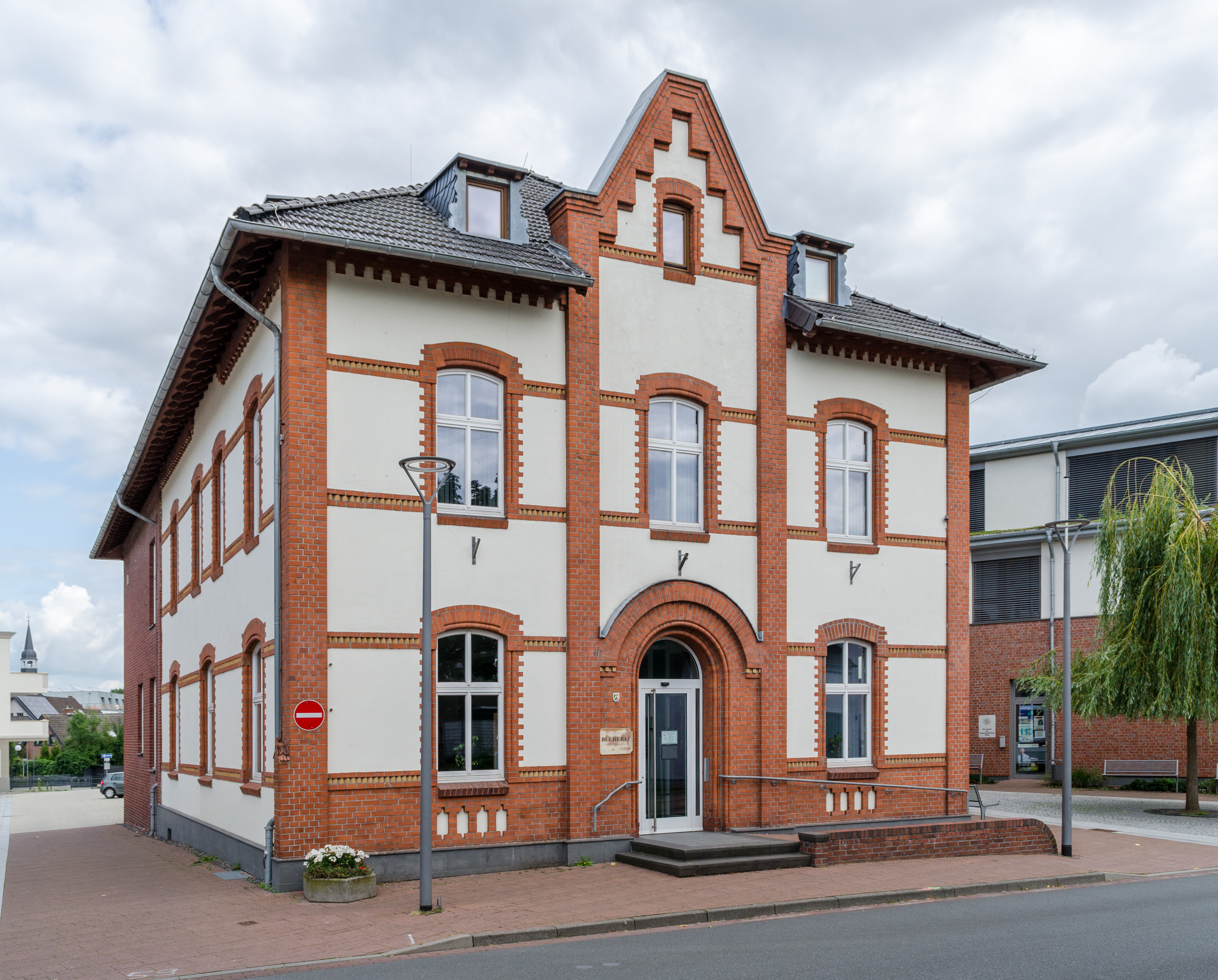
- Town hall

- Coat of arms

- Location of Alpen within Wesel district
- Interactive map of Alpen
- Location within Germany Location within North Rhine-Westphalia
- Coordinates: 51°34′30″N 06°30′45″E
- Country: Germany
- State: North Rhine-Westphalia
- Admin. region: Düsseldorf
- District: Wesel
- Subdivisions: 4

Government
  - Mayor (2025–30): Ludger Staymann (CDU)

Area
  - Total: 59.6 km^{2} (23.0 sq mi)
- Elevation: 25 m (82 ft)

Population (2025-12-31)
  - Total: 12,588
  - Density: 211/km^{2} (547/sq mi)
- Time zone: UTC+01:00 (CET)
  - Summer (DST): UTC+02:00 (CEST)
- Postal codes: 46519
- Dialling codes: 02802
- Vehicle registration: WES
- Website: www.alpen.de

Alpen (German pronunciation: [ˈalpn̩]) is a municipality in the district of Wesel, North Rhine-Westphalia, Germany.

== Geography ==
Alpen is situated in the Lower Rhine region, located between the Ruhr area and the border with the Netherlands. Adjacent cities are Rheinberg, Xanten.

=== Division of the town ===
The municipality consists of 4 districts:

- Alpen
- Menzelen
- Veen
- Bönninghardt

== History ==
Alpen was mentioned documentarily for the first time in 1074.

== Population ==
Historical population

Year	Pop.	±% p.a.
1965	9,073	—
1970	9,308	+0.51%
1975	9,642	+0.71%
1980	9,714	+0.15%
1985	10,203	+0.99%
1990	11,003	+1.52%
1995	12,235	+2.15%

Year	Pop.	±% p.a.
2000	12,596	+0.58%
2005	12,910	+0.49%
2010	12,772	−0.21%
2015	12,798	+0.04%
2020	12,502	−0.47%
2025	12,588	+0.14%

Source: Landesdatabank Nordrhein-Westfalen

== Politics ==
The current mayor is Ludger Staymann (CDU), who was elected with 61.9% of the votes during the 2025 local elections.

=== City Council ===
The Alpen city council governs the city alongside the Mayor. The most recent city council election was held on 14 September 2025, and the results were as follows:

Party	Votes	%	+/-	Seats	+/-
Christian Democratic Union (CDU)	3,612	48.5	▼2.5	17	±0
Free Citizens Society Alpen (FBA)	1,070	14.4	New	5	New
Alliance 90/The Greens (Grüne)	916	12.3	▼7.3	4	▼2
Social Democratic Party (SPD)	838	11.3	▼4.3	4	▼1
Alternative for Germany (AfD)	500	6.7	New	2	New
The Left (Die Linke)	300	4.0	New	1	New
The PARTY (Die PARTEI)	207	2.8	▼2.0	1	±0
Valid votes	7,443	98.8			
Invalid votes	90	1.2			
Total	7,533	100.0		34	▲2
Electorate/voter turnout	10,956	68.8			
Source: Municipality of Alpen

== Transport ==
Alpen is reachable by the Bundesautobahn 57 and the federal highways B57 and B58. There is also a train, the RB31 from Duisburg Hbf (direction Xanten) every hour which stops at Alpen. From there it is a 10-minute walk into the centre of Alpen.

== Security ==
The municipality of Alpen maintains a Volunteer Fire Department consisting three firehouses with about 105 active firefighter and 14 vehicles. In addition to the area of Alpen, the Bundesautobahn 57 is also part of the area of operation. Crime protection is provided by the state Police of North Rhine-Westphalia with stations in Rheinberg, Xanten and Kamp-Lintfort.
