= Rheinberg =

- Town
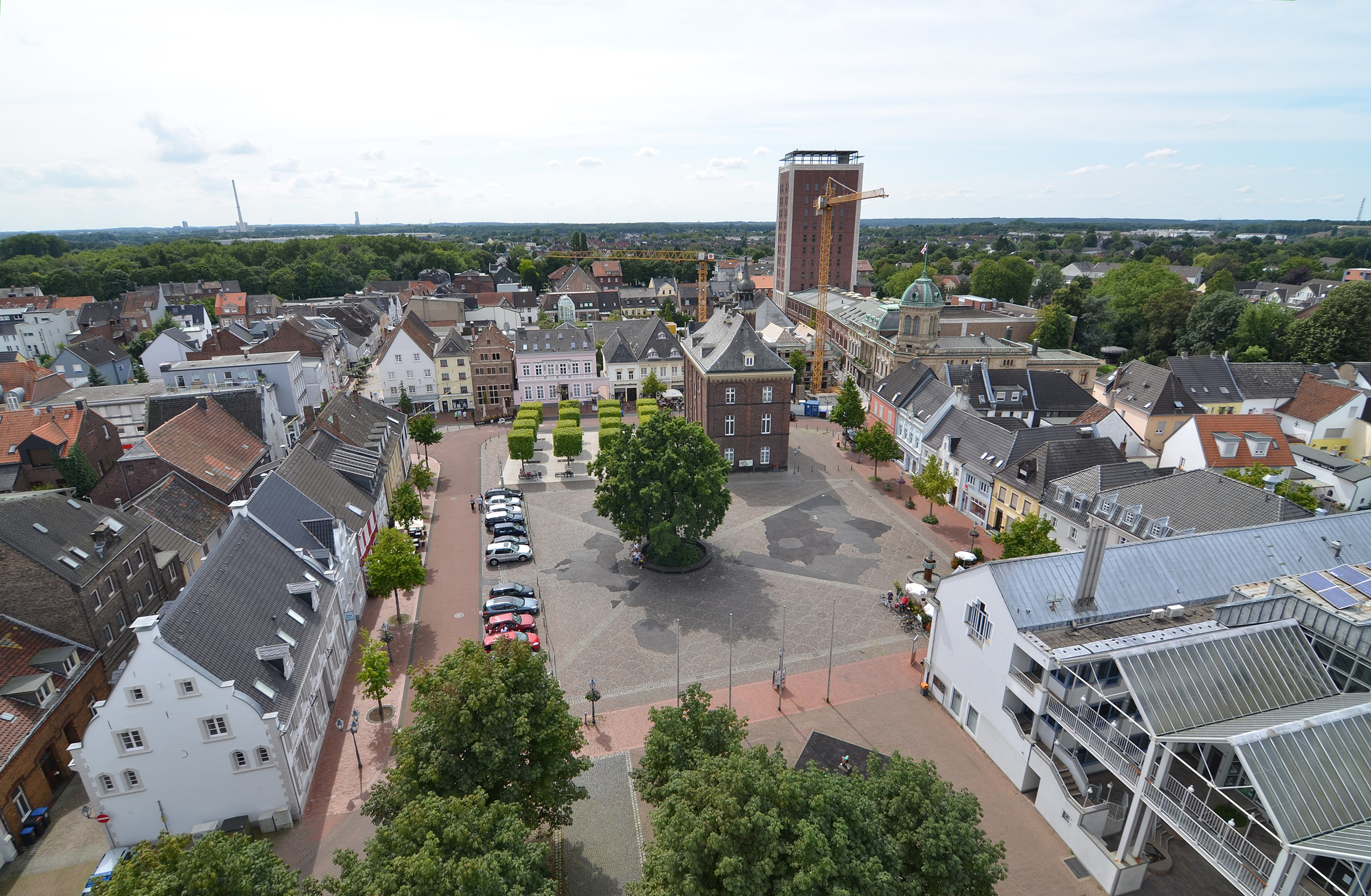
- Historic market square, view from St. Peter Church

- Coat of arms

- Location of Rheinberg within Wesel district
- Interactive map of Rheinberg
- Location within Germany Location within North Rhine-Westphalia
- Coordinates: 51°32′48″N 6°36′2″E
- Country: Germany
- State: North Rhine-Westphalia
- Admin. region: Düsseldorf
- District: Wesel
- Subdivisions: 4

Government
  - Mayor (2020–25): Dietmar Heyde (Greens)

Area
  - Total: 75.24 km^{2} (29.05 sq mi)
- Elevation: 20 m (66 ft)

Population (2025-12-31)
  - Total: 30,951
  - Density: 411.4/km^{2} (1,065/sq mi)
- Time zone: UTC+01:00 (CET)
  - Summer (DST): UTC+02:00 (CEST)
- Postal codes: 47495
- Dialling codes: 02843 Rheinberg; 02802 Alpen, Germany; 02844 Orsoy
- Vehicle registration: WES, MO, DIN
- Website: www.rheinberg.de

Rheinberg (German: [ˈʁaɪnbɛʁk]) is a town in the district of Wesel, in North Rhine-Westphalia, Germany. It is situated on the left bank of the Rhine, approx. 10 kilometres (6 miles) north of Moers and 15 km (9 miles) south of Wesel.

It comprises the municipal districts of Rheinberg, Borth, Budberg, and Orsoy.

== History ==
Rheinberg, is first documented in 1003, came into the possession of the archbishops of Cologne in the 11th century. After the town rights of Rheinberg had been granted to Archbishop Heinrich von Molenark in 1233, the construction of a city fortification began. This was initially only made of wood, but was replaced at the end of the 13th century by basalt, among other things. Almost at the same time, around 1293, the construction of the electoral palace and the customs tower called the Powder Tower, northeast of the city center, began.

Explosion of the Powder Tower in 1598, in which large parts of Rheinberg, the castle and the associated Old Waiter's Shop were destroyed

The castle was surrounded by a moat and had four towers and two drawbridges. The main bridge led to the city, the other to the outbuildings. The bailiff's manor was also built there in 1573 (Alte Kellnerei) It served as a grainstore for the income of the Amt Rheinberg and was used in the western part as a stables, but initially also as a dwelling of Salentin von Isenburg.

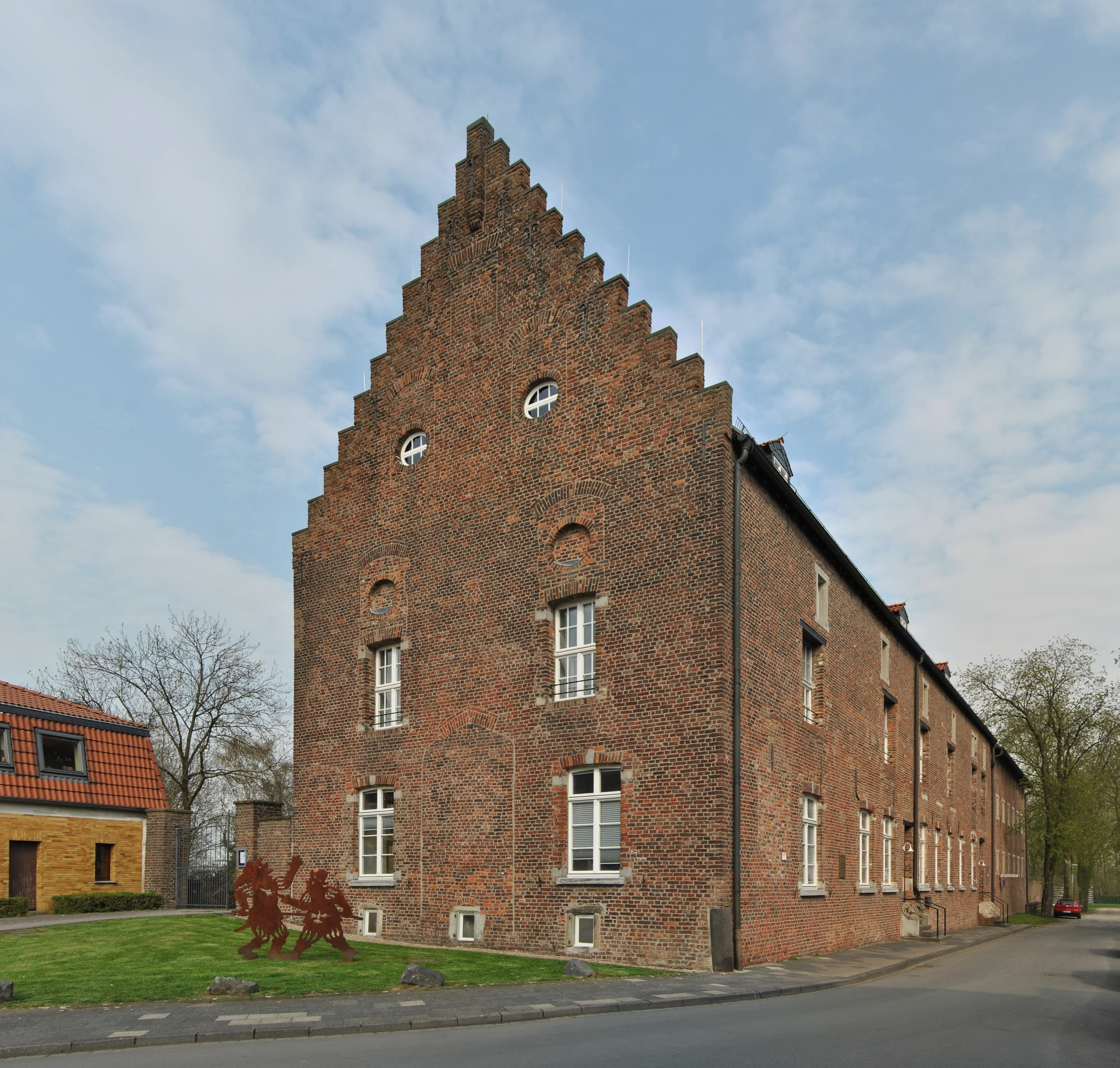
Alte Kellnerei Rheinberg

In October 1598, during the siege of Rheinberg by the Spaniards under Francisco de Mendoza, an explosion occurred in the Powder Tower, destroying large parts of the city and castle. Only parts of the winery and a tower have been preserved. Due to further battles, the Old Winery could not be taken up until 1627. It was fundamentally rebuilt. The western section was extended to two and a half floors as the apartment of the respective Schultheiß and waiter as well as the Electorate of Cologne officials, increasingly also the fortress governors, and equipped with larger window openings. The eastern part was given two floors and was now the armoury. Both wings were separated by a massive gable wall. At that time, the winery's bleaching groundswere also located on the grounds of the winery. Military activities were also pursued on these, so there was training and temporarily soldiers' quarters were also on the square.

During the Eighty Years' War (1566–1648), Rheinberg became known as the whore of the war since it was captured and retaken so many times by competing belligerents. First taken in 1590, then 1597, 1599, 1601, 1606 and finally where Prince Rupert of the Rhine gained his first military experience fighting alongside the Protestant Frederick Henry, Prince of Orange in 1633.

A century later the Battle of Rheinberg was fought on 12 June 1758, during the Seven Years' War.

It is the location of a Commonwealth War Graves Commission cemetery, where 3,327 Commonwealth servicemen of the Second World War are buried or commemorated. The majority of those now buried in the cemetery were airmen re-interred from German cemeteries after the war. The men of the other fighting services buried there mostly lost their lives during the Battle of the Rhineland to the Elbe.

== Population ==
Historical population

Year	Pop.	±% p.a.
1965	22,326	—
1970	23,617	+1.13%
1975	25,631	+1.65%
1980	26,331	+0.54%
1985	26,066	−0.20%
1990	27,886	+1.36%
1995	29,638	+1.23%

Year	Pop.	±% p.a.
2000	31,193	+1.03%
2005	32,061	+0.55%
2010	31,587	−0.30%
2015	31,023	−0.36%
2020	30,933	−0.06%
2025	30,951	+0.01%

Source: Landesdatabank Nordrhein-Westfalen

== Economy ==
Rheinberg is the site of a 110,000-square-metre (1,200,000 sq ft) Amazon.com fulfilment warehouse. Rheinberg is also home to Underberg, one of the most famous liquor producers in Germany.

== Twin towns – sister cities ==
Rheinberg is twinned with:

- Hohenstein-Ernstthal, Germany
- Montreuil, France

== Notable people ==
- Samuel Gluckstein (1821–1873), founder of Salmon & Gluckstein tobacco merchants
- Franz Bücheler (1837–1908), philologist
- Klaus Zumwinkel (born 1943), former Chairman of the Board of Management of Deutsche Post AG
- Brigitte Mohnhaupt (born 1949), former member of the Red Army Faction
- Kurt Bodewig (born 1955), politician (SPD), former Federal Minister of the Interior
- Thomas Wagner (born 1967), cultural sociologist and author
- Isabell Werth (born 1969), equestrian and world champion in dressage, studied here
- Claudia Schiffer (born 1970), model and actress
- Nadine Hentschke (born 1982), athlete

== Gallery ==
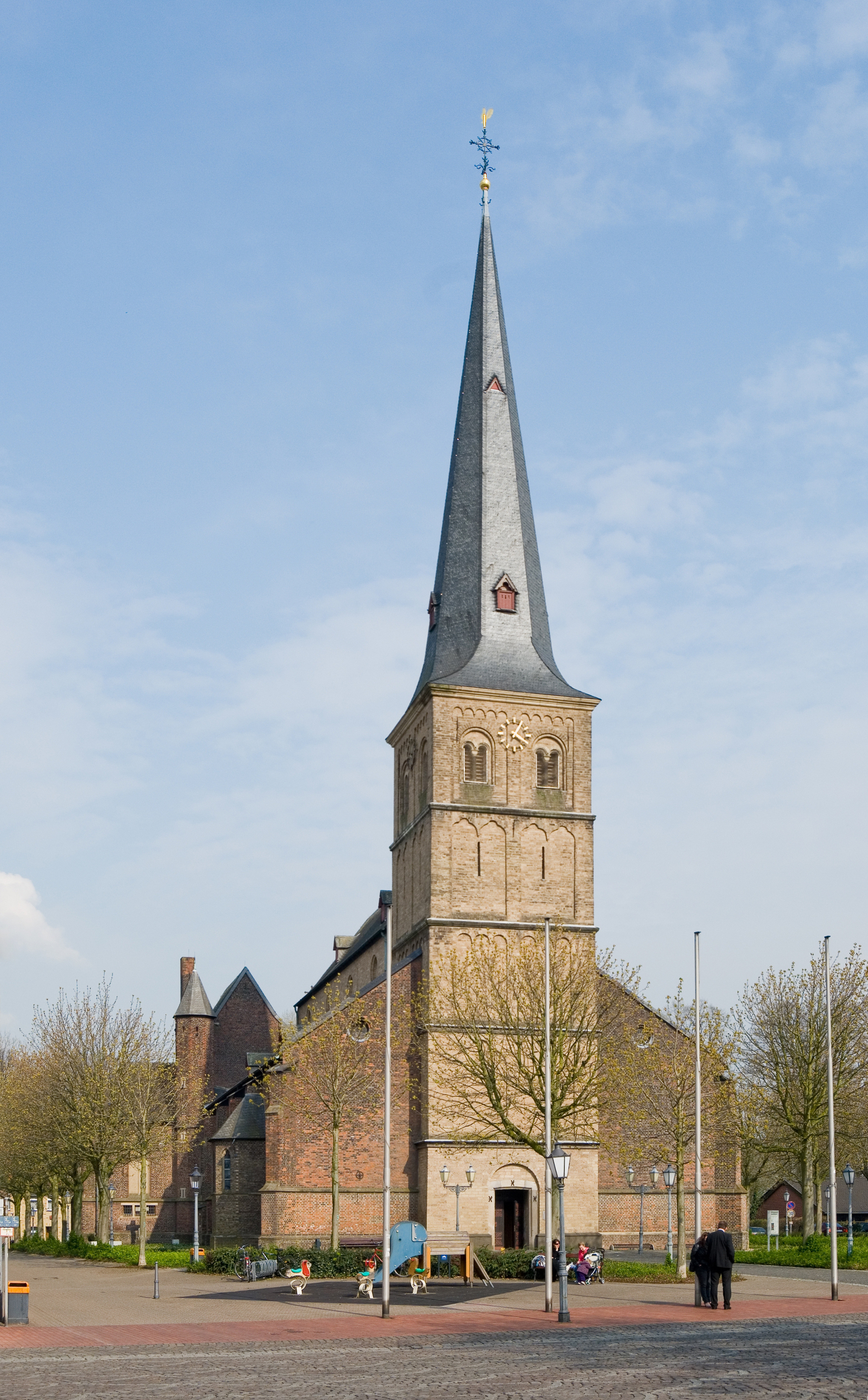
Catholic Saint Peter Church

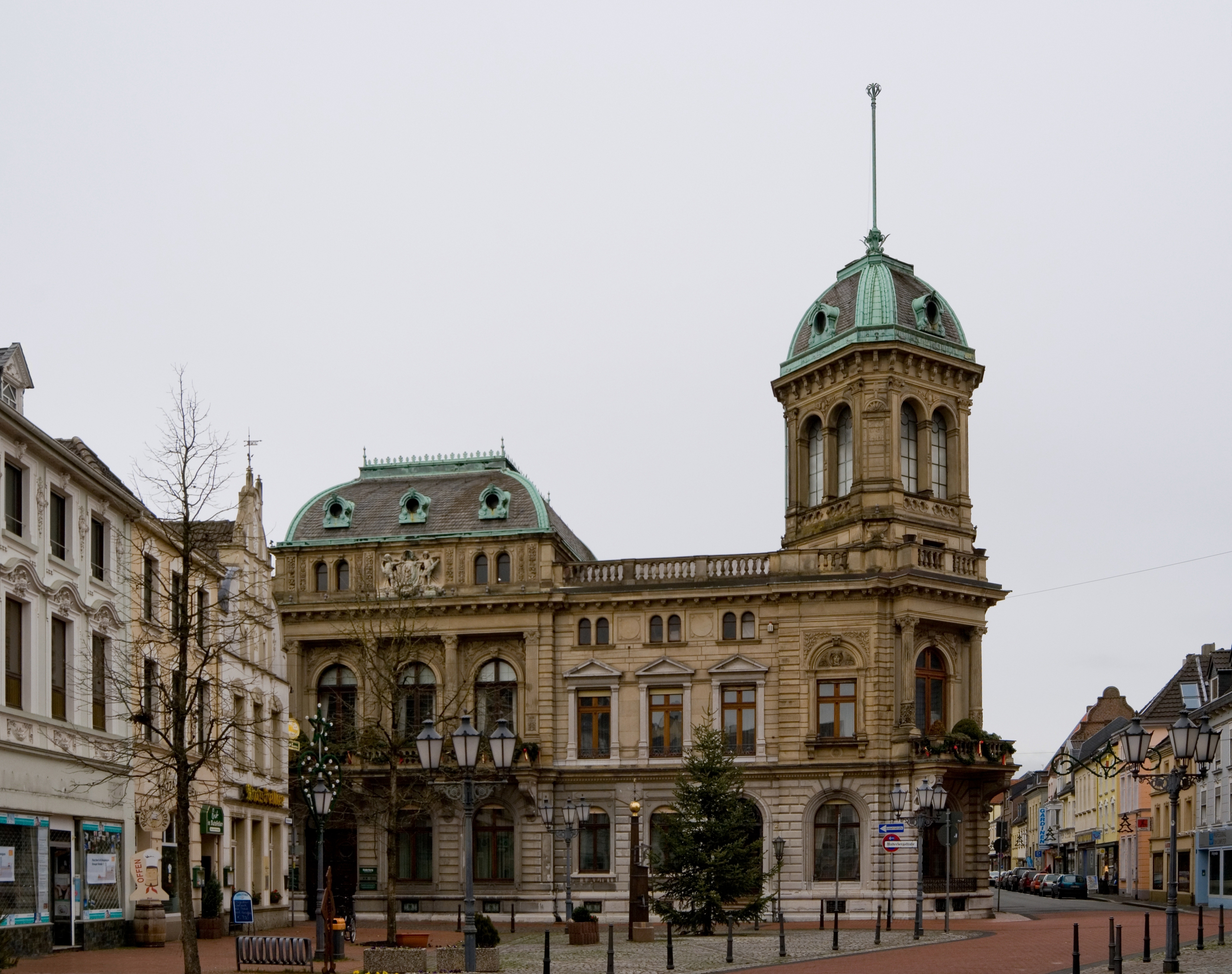
"Underberg Palais"

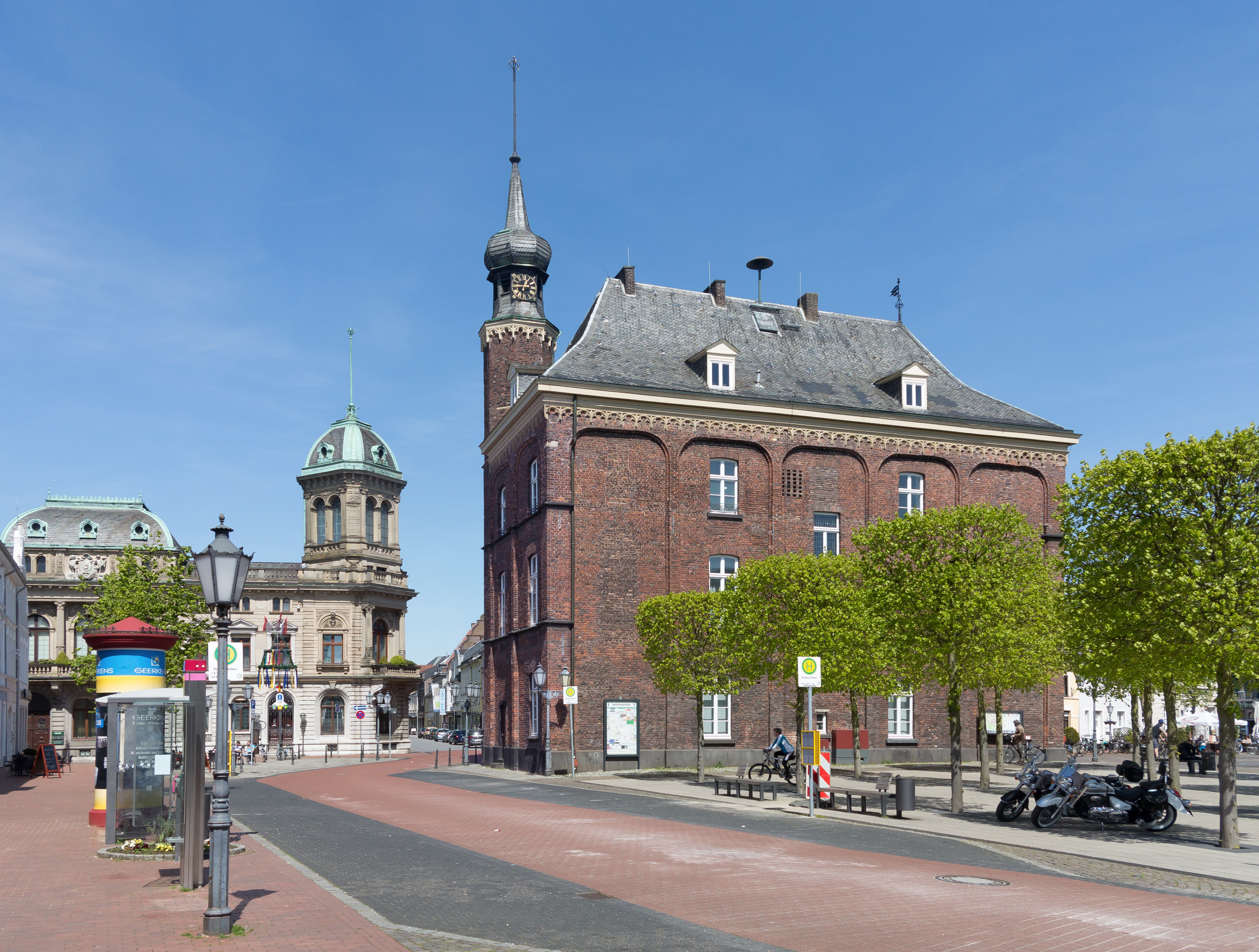
Old town hall and former factory-building of Underberg

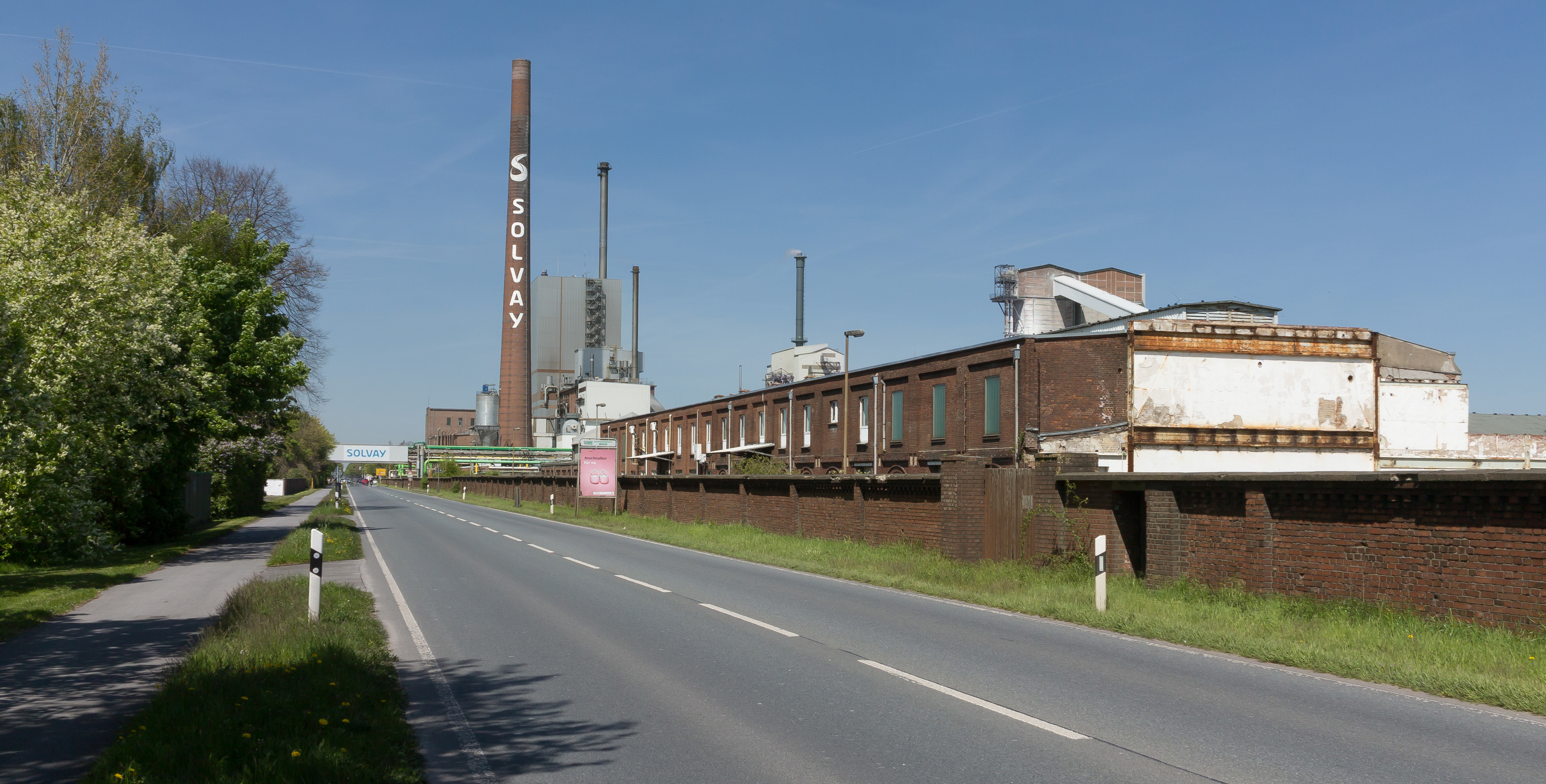
Rheinberg, Solvay factory

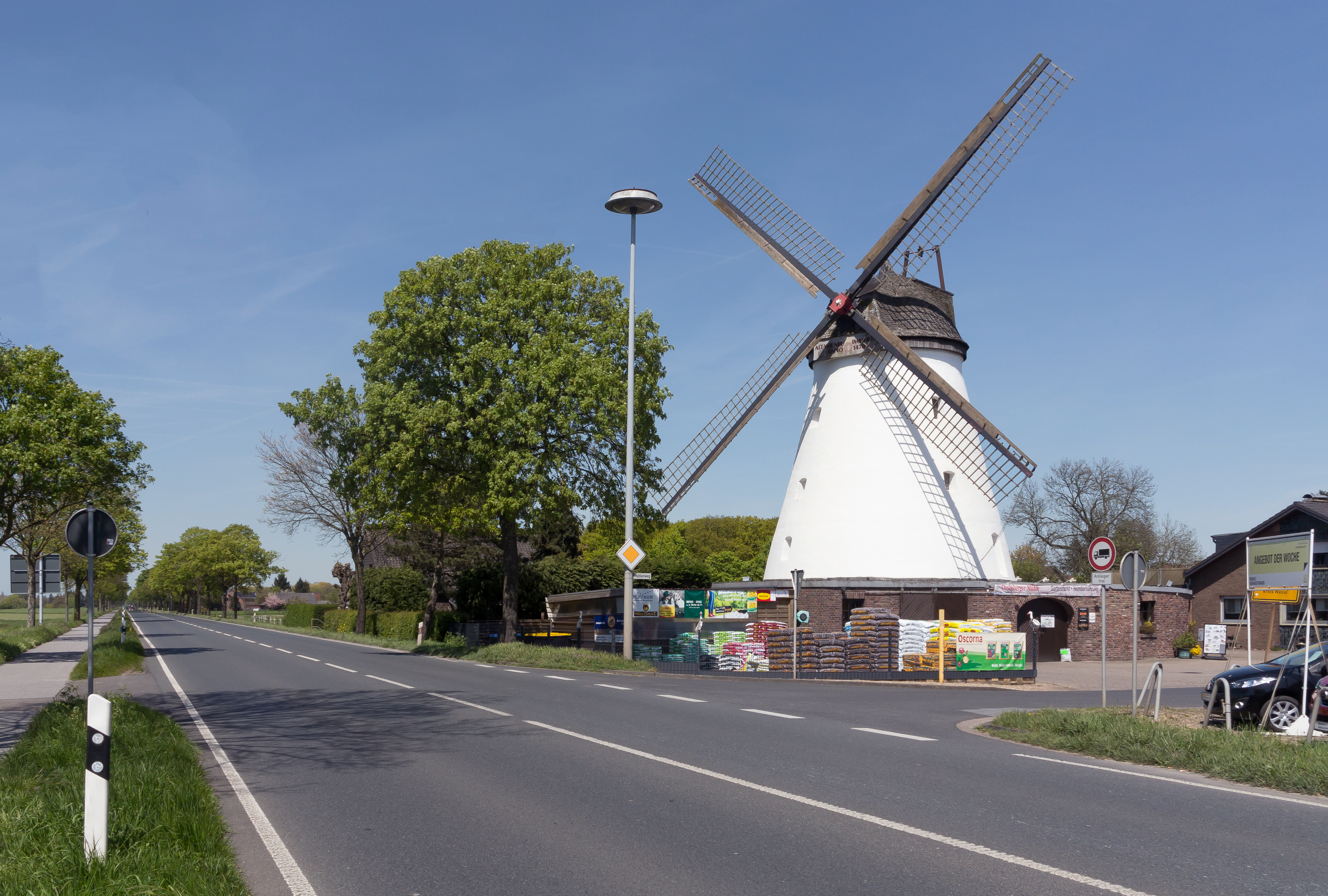
Ossenberg, windmill
