= Wesel (district) =

Coordinates: 51°40′N 6°40′E

- District
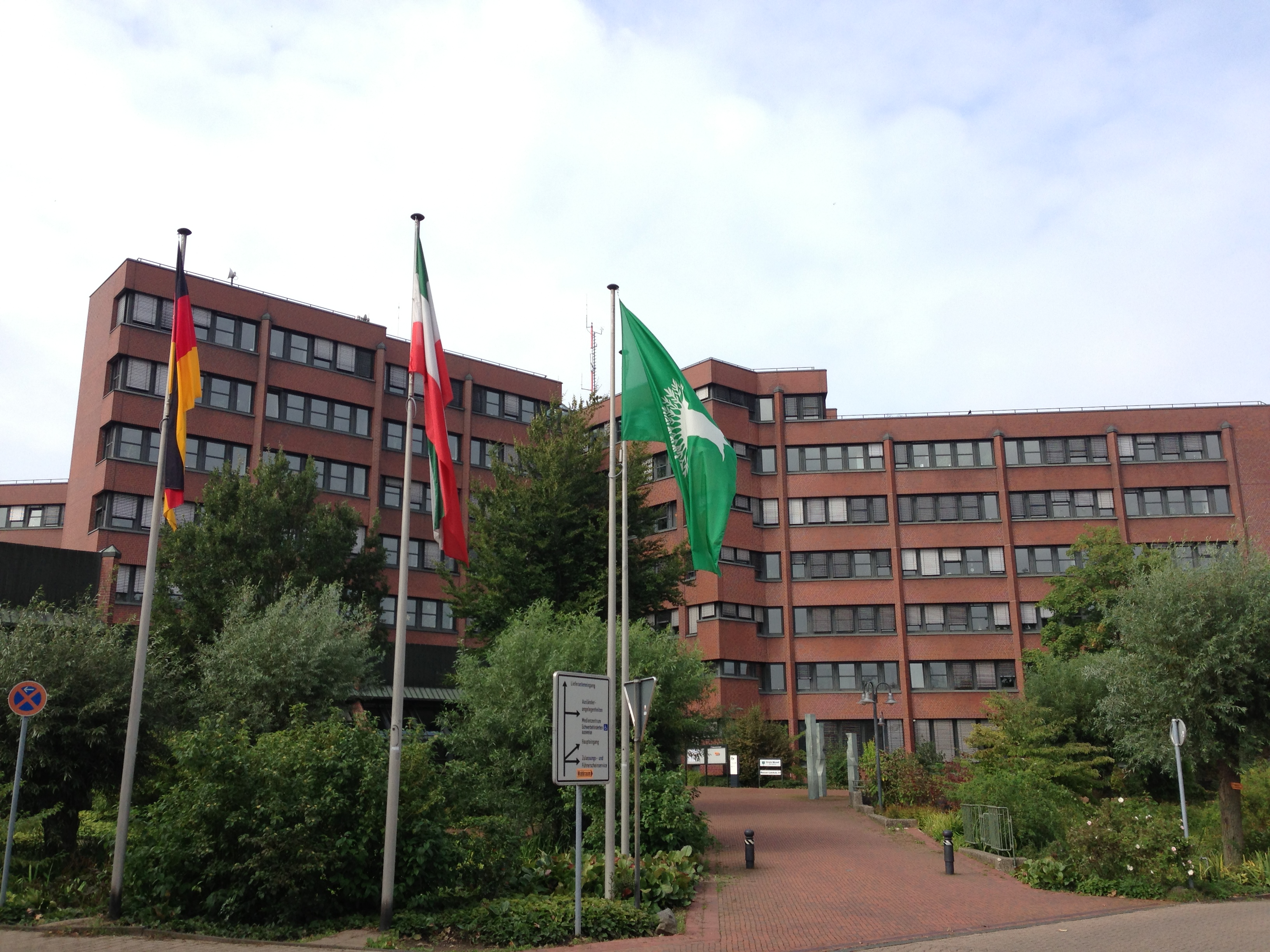

- Flag Coat of arms
- Country: Germany
- State: North Rhine-Westphalia
- Adm. region: Düsseldorf
- Founded: 1975
- Capital: Wesel

Government
  - District admin.: Ingo Brohl (CDU)

Area
  - Total: 1,042.4 km^{2} (402.5 sq mi)

Population (31 December 2025)
  - Total: 457,020
  - Density: 438.43/km^{2} (1,135.5/sq mi)
- Time zone: UTC+01:00 (CET)
  - Summer (DST): UTC+02:00 (CEST)
- Vehicle registration: WES, DIN, MO
- Website: www.kreis-wesel.de

Wesel (German pronunciation: [ˈveːzl̩]) is a Kreis (district) in the northwestern part of North Rhine-Westphalia, Germany. Neighboring districts are Borken, Recklinghausen, district-free cities Bottrop, Oberhausen, Duisburg and Krefeld, districts Viersen, Cleves.

== History ==
The district was created in 1975 by merging former districts Dinslaken, Moers and Rees, which were all created in 1816 when the area became part of Prussia. Its capital is Wesel, its most populated city is Moers.

== Geography ==
The main river through the district is the Rhine.

== Coat of arms ==
The coat of arms show a willow tree with 13 branches representing the 13 municipalities and cities in the district. The green color as well as the tree was chosen to show that the city is surrounded by a green belt. The coat of arms was granted in 1978.

== Towns and municipalities ==
Clickable map of towns and municipalities in the district

Towns
1. Dinslaken
2. Hamminkeln
3. Kamp-Lintfort
4. Moers
5. Neukirchen-Vluyn
6. Rheinberg
7. Voerde
8. Wesel
9. Xanten
Municipalities
1. Alpen
2. Hünxe
3. Schermbeck
4. Sonsbeck
