= Kleve (electoral district) =

Federal electoral district of Germany

Coordinates: 51°39′09″N 6°15′32″E

111 Kleve
- Electoral district for the Bundestag
- Kleve in 2025
- State: North Rhine-Westphalia
- Population: 312,500 (2019)
- Electorate: 225,463 (2021)
- Major settlements: Kleve; Goch; Geldern
- Area: 1,233.0 km^{2}

Current electoral district
- Created: 1949
- Party: CDU
- Member: Stefan Rouenhoff
- Elected: 2017, 2021, 2025

Kleve is an electoral constituency (German: Wahlkreis) represented in the Bundestag. It elects one member via first-past-the-post voting. Under the current constituency numbering system, it is designated as constituency 111. It is located in western North Rhine-Westphalia, comprising the district of Kleve.

Kleve was created for the inaugural 1949 federal election. Since 2017, it has been represented by Stefan Rouenhoff of the Christian Democratic Union (CDU).

== Geography ==
Kleve is located in western North Rhine-Westphalia. As of the 2021 federal election, it is coterminous with the Kleve district.

== History ==
Kleve was created in 1949, then known as Geldern – Kleve. It acquired its current name in the 1965 election. In the 1949 election, it was North Rhine-Westphalia constituency 26 in the numbering system. From 1953 through 1961, it was number 85. From 1965 through 1976, it was number 83. From 1980 through 1998, it was number 81. From 2002 through 2009, it was number 113. In the 2013 through 2021 elections, it was number 112. From the 2025 election, it has been number 111.

Originally, the constituency comprised the districts of Geldern and Kleve. In the 1965 through 1976 elections, it comprised the Geldern and Kleve districts as well as the municipalities of Rheinberg, Xanten, Alpen, and Sonsbeck from the Moers district. Since 1980, it has been coterminous with the Kleve district.

Election	No.	Name	Borders
1949	26	Geldern – Kleve	Geldern district; Kleve district
1953	85	Geldern – Kleve	Geldern district; Kleve district
1957	85	Geldern – Kleve	Geldern district; Kleve district
1961	85	Geldern – Kleve	Geldern district; Kleve district
1965	83	Kleve	Geldern district; Kleve district; Moers district (only Rheinberg, Xanten, Alpen, and Sonsbeck municipalities)
1969	83	Kleve	Geldern district; Kleve district; Moers district (only Rheinberg, Xanten, Alpen, and Sonsbeck municipalities)
1972	83	Kleve	Geldern district; Kleve district; Moers district (only Rheinberg, Xanten, Alpen, and Sonsbeck municipalities)
1976	83	Kleve	Geldern district; Kleve district; Moers district (only Rheinberg, Xanten, Alpen, and Sonsbeck municipalities)
1980	81	Kleve	Kleve district
1983	81	Kleve	Kleve district
1987	81	Kleve	Kleve district
1990	81	Kleve	Kleve district
1994	81	Kleve	Kleve district
1998	81	Kleve	Kleve district
2002	113	Kleve	Kleve district
2005	113	Kleve	Kleve district
2009	113	Kleve	Kleve district
2013	112	Kleve	Kleve district
2017	112	Kleve	Kleve district
2021	112	Kleve	Kleve district
2025	111	Kleve	Kleve district

== Members ==
The constituency has been held continuously by the Christian Democratic Union (CDU) since 1949. It was first represented by Martin Frey from 1949 to 1953, followed by Emil Solke until 1961, Felix von Vittinghoff-Schell until 1969, and Solke again until 1976. Jochen van Aerssen then served from 1976 to 1983. Heinrich Seesing was representative from 1983 to 1994. Ronald Pofalla served from 1949 to 2017. Stefan Rouenhoff has been representative since the 2017 election.

Election	Member	Party	%
1949	Martin Frey	CDU	60.0
1953	Emil Solke	CDU	73.1
1957	Emil Solke	CDU	75.6
1961	Felix von Vittinghoff-Schell	CDU	70.6
1965	Felix von Vittinghoff-Schell	CDU	68.2
1969	Emil Solke	CDU	63.5
1972	Emil Solke	CDU	58.7
1976	Jochen van Aerssen	CDU	60.3
1980	Jochen van Aerssen	CDU	55.5
1983	Heinrich Seesing	CDU	60.2
1987	Heinrich Seesing	CDU	55.2
1990	Heinrich Seesing	CDU	52.5
1994	Ronald Pofalla	CDU	50.9
1998	Ronald Pofalla	CDU	47.3
2002	Ronald Pofalla	CDU	46.1
2005	Ronald Pofalla	CDU	50.3
2009	Ronald Pofalla	CDU	48.9
2013	Ronald Pofalla	CDU	50.9
2017	Stefan Rouenhoff	CDU	45.0
2021	Stefan Rouenhoff	CDU	37.6
2025	Stefan Rouenhoff	CDU	41.2

== Election results ==
=== 2025 election ===
Federal election (2025): Kleve
Notes:	Blue background denotes the winner of the electorate vote. Pink background denotes a candidate elected from their party list. Yellow background denotes an electorate win by a list member, or other incumbent. A ✓ or ✗ denotes status of any incumbent, win or lose respectively.						
Party	Candidate	Votes	%	±%	Party votes	%	±%
CDU	✓ Stefan Rouenhoff	74,631	41.2	▲3.6	66,214	36.5	▲4.2
SPD	Bodo Wißen	39,191	21.6	▼6.8	34,003	18.8	▼9.4
AfD	Sven Elbers	28,974	16.0	▲10.2	29,096	16.0	▲10.4
Greens	Olaf Plotke	16,447	9.1	▼4.8	18,986	10.5	▼3.4
Left	Jolanda Douven	10,755	5.9	▲3.4	11,625	6.4	▲3.6
FDP	Daniel Rütter	6,098	3.4	▼5.4	8,100	4.5	▼7.0
BSW					6,094	3.4	
Volt	Fabian Schuchert	2,499	1.4		1,146	0.6	▲0.4
FW	Maciej Klawczynski	2,429	1.3	▼0.7	1,338	0.7	▼0.1
Tierschutzpartei					2,421	1.3	▼0.1
PARTEI					891	0.5	▼0.4
dieBasis				▼1.1	443	0.2	▼0.7
PdF					328	0.2	▲0.1
Team Todenhöfer					252	0.1	0.0
BD					213	0.1	
Values					90	0.0	
MERA25					43	0.0	
MLPD					32	0.0	0.0
Pirates							▼0.4
Gesundheitsforschung							▼0.1
Humanists							▼0.1
ÖDP							▼0.1
Bündnis C							0.0
SGP						0.0	0.0
Informal votes		1,351			1,060		
Total valid votes		181,024			181,315		
Turnout		182,375	81.5	▲5.7			
CDU hold	Majority	35,440	19.6				

=== 2021 election ===
Federal election (2021): Kleve
Notes:	Blue background denotes the winner of the electorate vote. Pink background denotes a candidate elected from their party list. Yellow background denotes an electorate win by a list member, or other incumbent. A ✓ or ✗ denotes status of any incumbent, win or lose respectively.						
Party	Candidate	Votes	%	±%	Party votes	%	±%
CDU	✓ Stefan Rouenhoff	63,701	37.6	▼7.4	54,793	32.3	▼9.3
SPD	Bodo Wißen	48,142	28.4	▼2.2	47,837	28.2	▲4.7
Greens	Friederike Janitza	23,477	13.9	▲8.9	23,587	13.9	▲7.9
FDP	Georg Cluse	14,821	8.7	▲1.2	19,542	11.5	▼2.0
AfD	Gerd Plorin	9,788	5.8	▼0.8	9,632	5.7	▼1.3
Left	Norbert Hayduk	4,235	2.5	▼1.7	4,728	2.8	▼2.8
Tierschutzpartei					2,386	1.4	▲0.7
FW	Adriana Hellmann	3,409	2.0	▲1.1	1,488	0.9	▲0.5
dieBasis	Andreas Reiß	1,892	1.1		1,628	1.0	
PARTEI					1,438	0.8	▲0.3
Pirates					605	0.4	0.0
Volt					396	0.2	
Team Todenhöfer					297	0.2	
LIEBE					241	0.1	
Gesundheitsforschung					224	0.1	0.0
LfK					167	0.1	
NPD					150	0.1	▼0.1
Humanists					121	0.1	0.0
ÖDP					115	0.1	0.0
V-Partei3					107	0.1	0.0
du.					77	0.0	
Bündnis C					60	0.0	
PdF					60	0.0	
MLPD					28	0.0	0.0
LKR					28	0.0	
DKP					17	0.0	0.0
SGP					15	0.0	0.0
Informal votes		1,628			1,326		
Total valid votes		169,465			169,767		
Turnout		171,093	75.9	▲1.1			
CDU hold	Majority	15,559	9.2	▼5.2			

=== 2017 election ===
Federal election (2017): Kleve
Notes:	Blue background denotes the winner of the electorate vote. Pink background denotes a candidate elected from their party list. Yellow background denotes an electorate win by a list member, or other incumbent. A ✓ or ✗ denotes status of any incumbent, win or lose respectively.						
Party	Candidate	Votes	%	±%	Party votes	%	±%
CDU	Stefan Rouenhoff	75,375	45.0	▼5.9	69,700	41.6	▼7.0
SPD	Barbara Hendricks	51,197	30.6	▼2.5	39,316	23.5	▼3.6
FDP	Ralf Klapdor	12,692	7.6	▲4.4	22,687	13.5	▲7.9
AfD	Gerd Plorin	11,019	6.6	▲3.2	11,621	6.9	▲3.0
Greens	Bruno Jöbkes	8,230	4.9	▼0.9	10,098	6.0	▼0.1
Left	Ferdinand Niemann	7,096	4.2		9,366	5.6	▲1.0
Tierschutzpartei					1,170	0.7	
PARTEI					969	0.6	▲0.3
FW	Stephan Heintze	1,606	1.0		614	0.4	▲0.2
Pirates					560	0.3	▼1.7
NPD					330	0.2	▼0.6
V-Partei³					171	0.1	
Independent	Willi Bovenkerk	168	0.1				
DiB					165	0.1	
ÖDP					157	0.1	0.0
Gesundheitsforschung					142	0.1	
BGE					135	0.1	
Volksabstimmung					125	0.1	▼0.1
DM					120	0.1	
Die Humanisten					73	0.0	
MLPD					63	0.0	0.0
AD-DEMOKRATEN					56	0.0	
DKP					15	0.0	
SGP					5	0.0	0.0
Informal votes		1,674			1,399		
Total valid votes		167,383			167,658		
Turnout		169,057	74.8	▲3.1			
CDU hold	Majority	24,178	14.4	▼3.4			

=== 2013 election ===
Federal election (2013): Kleve
Notes:	Blue background denotes the winner of the electorate vote. Pink background denotes a candidate elected from their party list. Yellow background denotes an electorate win by a list member, or other incumbent. A ✓ or ✗ denotes status of any incumbent, win or lose respectively.						
Party	Candidate	Votes	%	±%	Party votes	%	±%
CDU	✓ Ronald Pofalla	81,216	50.9	▲2.0	77,833	48.6	▲6.4
SPD	Barbara Hendricks	52,778	33.1	▲3.5	43,253	27.0	▲3.5
Greens	Bruno Jöbkes	9,220	5.8	▼0.7	9,856	6.2	▼1.7
FDP	Ralf Klapdor	5,003	3.1	▼6.2	9,094	5.7	▼10.4
Left					7,322	4.6	▼1.5
AfD	Gerd Plorin	5,316	3.3		6,300	3.9	
Pirates	Michael Peters	4,327	2.7		3,212	2.0	▲0.6
NPD	Viktor Schlak	1,630	1.0		1,293	0.8	▲0.1
PARTEI					377	0.2	
PRO					306	0.2	
Volksabstimmung					280	0.2	▲0.1
FW					234	0.1	
ÖDP					198	0.1	0.0
Nichtwahler					137	0.1	
REP					115	0.1	▼0.1
Party of Reason					101	0.1	
RRP					94	0.1	0.0
BIG					47	0.0	
MLPD					31	0.0	0.0
Die Rechte					30	0.0	
BüSo					24	0.0	0.0
PSG					23	0.0	0.0
Informal votes		2,383			1,713		
Total valid votes		159,490			160,160		
Turnout		161,873	71.7	▲1.6			
CDU hold	Majority	28,438	17.8	▼1.5			

=== 2009 election ===
Federal election (2009): Kleve
Notes:	Blue background denotes the winner of the electorate vote. Pink background denotes a candidate elected from their party list. Yellow background denotes an electorate win by a list member, or other incumbent. A ✓ or ✗ denotes status of any incumbent, win or lose respectively.						
Party	Candidate	Votes	%	±%	Party votes	%	±%
CDU	✓ Ronald Pofalla	76,480	48.9	▼1.4	66,161	42.2	▼2.2
SPD	Barbara Hendricks	46,290	29.6	▼7.6	36,810	23.5	▼9.6
FDP	Paul Friedhoff	14,620	9.4	▲4.4	25,249	16.1	▲5.4
Greens	Bruno Jöbkes	10,148	6.5	▲2.8	12,355	7.9	▲2.3
Left	Axel Gonder	8,787	5.6	▲2.6	9,566	6.1	▲2.3
Pirates					2,277	1.5	
NPD					1,045	0.7	▼0.1
Tierschutzpartei					974	0.6	▲0.1
FAMILIE					819	0.5	▲0.1
RENTNER					511	0.3	
REP					299	0.2	0.0
RRP					166	0.1	
ÖDP					138	0.1	
Volksabstimmung					115	0.1	0.0
DVU					95	0.1	
Centre					90	0.1	0.0
BüSo					29	0.0	0.0
MLPD					25	0.0	0.0
PSG					15	0.0	0.0
Informal votes		2,128			1,714		
Total valid votes		156,325			156,739		
Turnout		158,453	70.1	▼7.8			
CDU hold	Majority	30,190	19.3	▲6.2			

=== 2005 election ===
Federal election (2005): Kleve
Notes:	Blue background denotes the winner of the electorate vote. Pink background denotes a candidate elected from their party list. Yellow background denotes an electorate win by a list member, or other incumbent. A ✓ or ✗ denotes status of any incumbent, win or lose respectively.						
Party	Candidate	Votes	%	±%	Party votes	%	±%
CDU	✓ Ronald Pofalla	85,994	50.3	▲4.2	76,189	44.4	▲0.2
SPD	Barbara Hendricks	63,567	37.2	▼4.8	56,710	33.1	▼4.1
FDP	Paul Friedhoff	8,460	4.9	▼1.5	18,331	10.7	▲1.2
Greens	Benjamin Müller	6,610	3.7	▼0.4	9,545	5.6	▼0.7
Left	Axel Gonder	5,207	3.0	▲2.2	6,540	3.8	▲3.0
NPD	Joachim Liche	1,427	0.8		1,272	0.7	▲0.6
Tierschutzpartei					871	0.5	▲0.2
Familie					725	0.4	▲0.2
GRAUEN					485	0.3	▲0.1
REP					320	0.2	
PBC					117	0.1	
From Now on... Democracy Through Referendum					119	0.1	
Socialist Equality Party					90	0.1	
Centre					51	0.0	
BüSo					47	0.0	
MLPD					39	0.0	0.0
Informal votes		2,934			2,448		
Total valid votes		170,965			171,451		
Turnout		173,899	77.9	▼2.4			
CDU hold	Majority	22,427	13.1				
