= Bertels =

Bertels is a surname. Notable people with the surname include

- Edward Bertels (1932–2011), Belgian footballer
- Evgenii Eduardovich Bertels (1890–1957), Soviet-Russian Orientalist, Iranologist and Turkologist
- Franziska Bertels (born 1986), German bobsledder
- Jan Bertels (born 1968), Belgian politician
- Lieven Bertels (born 1971), Belgian musicologist, curator and impresario
- Thomas Bertels (born 1986), German former professional footballer

== See also ==
- Bertel
