= Genebrard =

Genebrard is a surname. Notable people with the surname include:

- Gilbert Génébrard (1535–1597), French Benedictine exegete and Orientalist
- Saint Genebrard (7th century), Irish priest who was martyred in Belgium
