= Adolf Althoff =

German circus owner

Adolf Althoff (German: [ˈaːdɔlf ˈʔalthɔf]; 25 June 1913 in Sonsbeck – 14 October 1998 in Stolberg (Rhineland) was a German circus owner, animal tamer and performer who saved several people from the Holocaust by having them work and travel in his circus.

== Personal life ==
He was born into the family in Sonsbeck, Germany, as a member of a 300-year-old circus family. He was the second youngest of eight children born to Dominick and Adele Althoff, née Mark. At age 17 he became publicity director for his families of the circus. In his twenties Althoff and his sister formed their own circus, of which he was the ringmaster for 30 years. He married Maria von der Gathen in 1939.

== During World War II ==
In 1940, Althoff began five years work in concealing four members of the Danner performing family in his circus. Althoff provided the Danners with false identity papers and had the family working under pseudonyms. Althoff warned the people he rescued with the code Go Fishing. He later stated that he felt he had to help those in need, and that he could not leave them to the Nazis. Irene Danner stated that Adolf would allow all to work without papers, and even fired an employee that had threatened to denounce him for hiding Jews in the circus.

In 1995 he and his wife Maria were named Righteous Among the Nations, an Israeli honor.

== Depiction in media ==
Althoff and his story have been featured in and provided inspiration for books such as Other Germans Under Hitler by Herbert Straeten, The Ringmasters Daughter by Carly Schabowski, and Hidden on the High Wire by Kathy Kacer. The events of his rescue during World War II are also dramatized in a 1998 Showtime TV-movie entitled Rescuers: Stories of Courage: Two Families.
