= Ronald Pofalla =

German politician

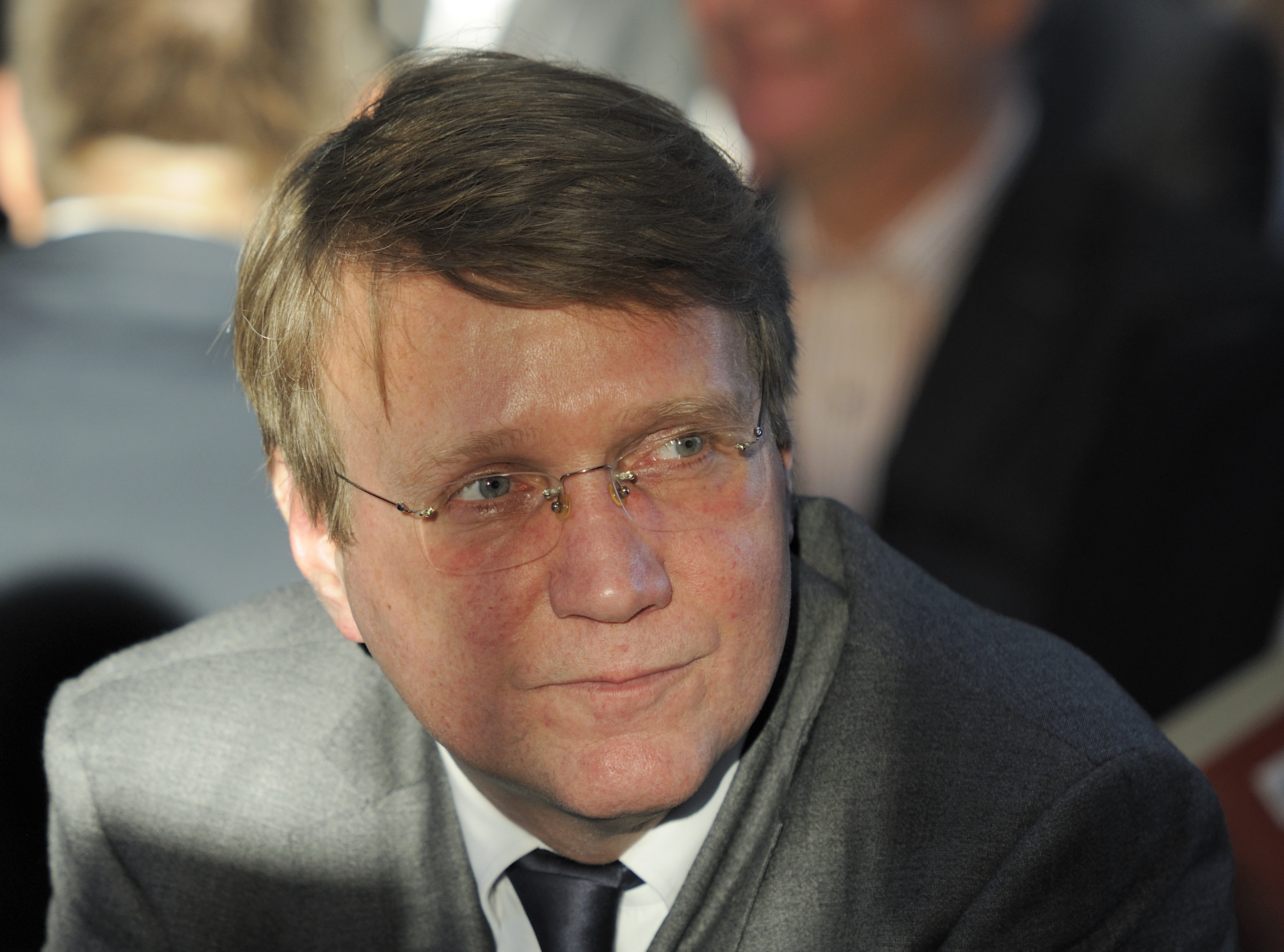
- Pofalla in 2013

Chair of the Kohlekommission
- In office 6 June 2018 – 23 January 2019 Serving with Matthias Platzeck, Barbara Praetorius, Stanislaw Tillich
- Preceded by: Position established
- Succeeded by: Position abolished

Head of the Chancellery Minister for Special Affairs
- In office 28 October 2009 – 17 December 2013
- Chancellor: Angela Merkel
- Preceded by: Thomas de Maizière
- Succeeded by: Peter Altmaier

Commissioner for the Federal Intelligence Services
- In office 28 October 2009 – 17 December 2013
- Chancellor: Angela Merkel
- Coordinator: Günter Heiß
- Preceded by: Thomas de Maizière
- Succeeded by: Peter Altmaier

General Secretary of the Christian Democratic Union
- In office 5 December 2005 – 28 October 2009
- Leader: Angela Merkel
- Preceded by: Volker Kauder
- Succeeded by: Hermann Gröhe
Bundestag constituencies
Member of the Bundestag for North Rhine-Westphalia
In office 10 November 1994 – 31 December 2014
Preceded by	Heinrich Seesing
Succeeded by	Thorsten Hoffmann (2015)
Constituency	Kleve
In office 20 December 1990 – 10 November 1994
Preceded by	multi-member district
Succeeded by	multi-member district
Constituency	Christian Democratic Union List

Personal details
- Born: 15 May 1959 (age 67) Weeze, North Rhine-Westphalia, West Germany (now Germany)
- Party: Christian Democratic Union (1975–)
- Spouse: Nina Hebisch (m. 2016)
- Children: 1
- Education: University of Cologne
- Occupation: Politician; Lawyer; Lobbyist
- Website: ronald-pofalla.de

Ronald Pofalla (born 15 May 1959) is a German lawyer and politician of the Christian Democratic Union (CDU) who served as the Chief of Staff of the German Chancellery and a Federal Minister for Special Affairs from 2009 to 2013, in the second coalition government of Chancellor Angela Merkel. From 2017 to 2022, he was the CEO of the infrastructure department of Deutsche Bahn.

== Early life and education ==
Pofalla studied social pedagogy at the Fachhochschule in Kleve. After finishing with a Diplom in 1981 he studied law at the University of Cologne. In 1991 he passed the second Staatsexamen. Since that time Pofalla has been licensed to work as a lawyer.

== Political career ==
=== Early beginnings ===
Pofalla has been a member of the CDU since 1975. At first he was engaged in the Junge Union. He was chairman of the JU in the State of North Rhine-Westphalia from 1986 to 1992.

=== Member of the German Parliament, 1990–2014 ===
During his time in parliament, Pofalla served on the Committee for the Scrutiny of Elections, Immunity and the Rules of Procedure, the Committee on Legal Affairs, the Committee on Labour and Social Affairs and the Committee on Economic Affairs and Technology.

From 2004 to 2005 Pofalla was deputy chairman of the CDU/CSU's parliamentary group in the Bundestag under the leadership of Angela Merkel, and served as the Secretary General of the CDU from 2005 to 2009. In the negotiations to form a coalition government of the Christian Democrats and the Free Democratic Party (FDP) following the 2009 federal elections, he led the CDU/CSU delegation in the working group on labour and social affairs; his counterpart of the FDP was Dirk Niebel.

=== Chief of Staff to the Chancellor, 2009–2013 ===
After the elections, Pofalla succeeded Thomas de Maizière as Chief of Staff to Chancellor Angela Merkel. During his time in office, he was repeatedly criticized for being rude towards other representatives of the Bundestag and other members of the German government. In September 2011 he seriously insulted Wolfgang Bosbach, senior group leader of the CDU/CSU-group in the Bundestag after an in-house discussion about the enhancement of the European Financial Stability Facility.

In the negotiations to form a coalition government following the 2013 federal elections, Pofalla was part of the 15-member leadership circle chaired by Merkel, Horst Seehofer and Sigmar Gabriel. As part of a cabinet reshuffle, he subsequently resigned as head of the Federal Chancellery.

== Career in the private sector ==
In January 2014 it was reported that Pofalla would be joining the management of Deutsche Bahn, the state-owned national rail network of Germany. He had previously worked for the company's subsidiary DB Netz between 2005 and 2009.

At Deutsche Bahn, Pofalla took up a "specially created lobbying post" said to carry compensation of more than a million euros a year. His successor in the Bundestag is Thorsten Hoffmann.

After transitioning to the private sector, Pofalla was made co-chairman of the Petersburg Dialogue, a semiofficial German-Russian symposium. From 2018 until 2019, he also served on the German government's so-called coal commission, which was tasked to develop a masterplan before the end of the year on how to phase-out coal and create a new economic perspective for the country's coal-mining regions.

In 2022, Pofalla was appointed to the managing board of real estate developer Gröner Group.

In April 2023, Pofalla was one of the 22 personal guests at the ceremony in which Angela Merkel was decorated with the Grand Cross of the Order of Merit for special achievement by President Frank-Walter Steinmeier at Schloss Bellevue in Berlin.

== Other activities ==
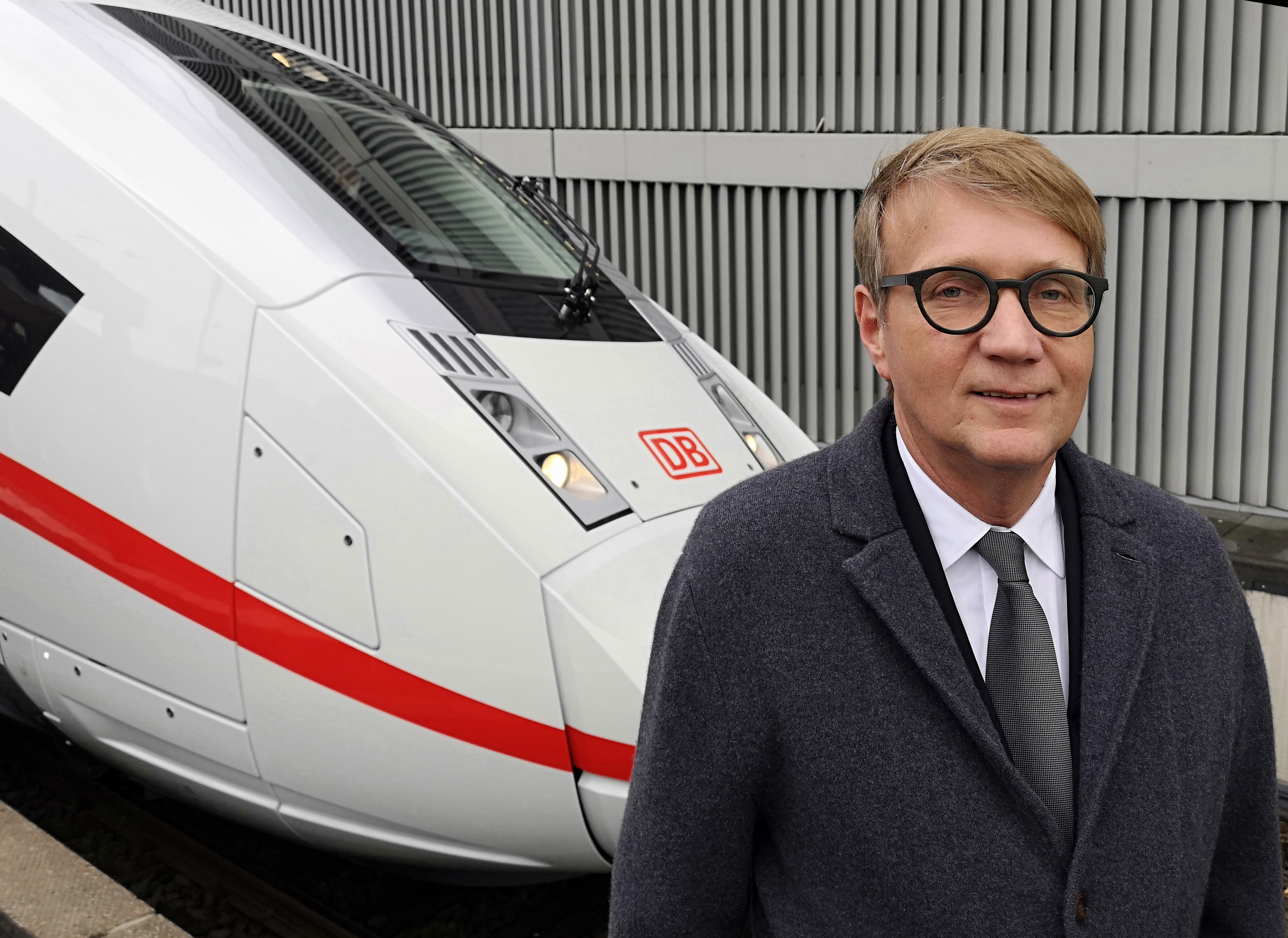
Pofalla in 2018

=== Corporate boards ===
- DEVK Rückversicherungs- und Beteiligungs-Aktiengesellschaft, Member of the supervisory board (since 2016)
- Sparda-Bank, Member of the Advisory Board
- KfW, Member of the supervisory board (2002-2006)

=== Non-profit organizations ===
- Bonner Akademie für Forschung und Lehre praktischer Politik (BAPP), Member of the Board of Trustees
- Zollverein Coal Mine Industrial Complex, Member of the Board of Trustees (since 2018)
- Jewish Museum Berlin, Member of the Board of Trustees
- German Institute for International and Security Affairs (SWP), vice-president of the council (2009-2013)
- Rhine-Waal University of Applied Sciences, Member of the Presidium (2009-2013)
- Konrad Adenauer Foundation, Member of the Board (2005-2009)
- ZDF, Member of the Television Board (2005-2009)

== Political positions ==
During his time in politics, Pofalla took an active interest in Belarus. In 2012, he publicly condemned the execution of Vladislav Kovalyov and Dmitry Konovalov, both 26, saying this move would further alienate Belarus from Europe. "Lukashenko thus drifts even further away from our European values," he said. "The already heavily burdened relation between Belarus and Europe will be rendered yet more difficult by this."

In the context of the Ukraine crisis, Pofalla has commented that "it wasn’t clever of Barack Obama to have downgraded Russia, in connection with the Ukraine conflict, to the level of a regional power."

== Controversy ==
Pofalla caused controversy when German tabloid Bild revealed that he had bought premium Montblanc writing materials worth 3,307.61 euros for his MP office at the expense of the Bundestag in 2009; at the time, it was the highest recorded order by any parliamentarian.
