= CIPAL =

Organization

C-smart, previously CIPAL, is an inter-municipal ICT service with head offices in Geel. Its name refers to the province of Antwerp and Limburg. The organisation is a governmental ICT-agency and inter-municipal association of municipalities, cities, towns, Social Welfare Centers, Provinces and other public authorities and it only provides services for public authorities.

== History ==
CIPAL was founded as CIPA (E: Centre for Informatics of the Province Antwerp) by Royal Decree on 2 April 1979 as a subregional centre of informatics and CIPA started on 1 January 1980. On 2 April 1983, CIPAL was founded as a collaboration between the Antwerp CIPA and the Limburg LIRIC (Dutch: Limburgs Reken- en Informatiecentrum). In 1987, the ICA (Dutch: Informatica Centrum Antwerpen) was created, aimed at the City of Antwerp which would become Telepolis Antwerpen and now Digipolis. In 1994, the headquarters of CIPAL moved to Geel. CIPAL nowadays services public authorities of the Flemish region of Belgium. On 22 April 2002 an agreement was signed for the development of a metropolitan library network for Antwerp.
