= Geel =

- City and municipality
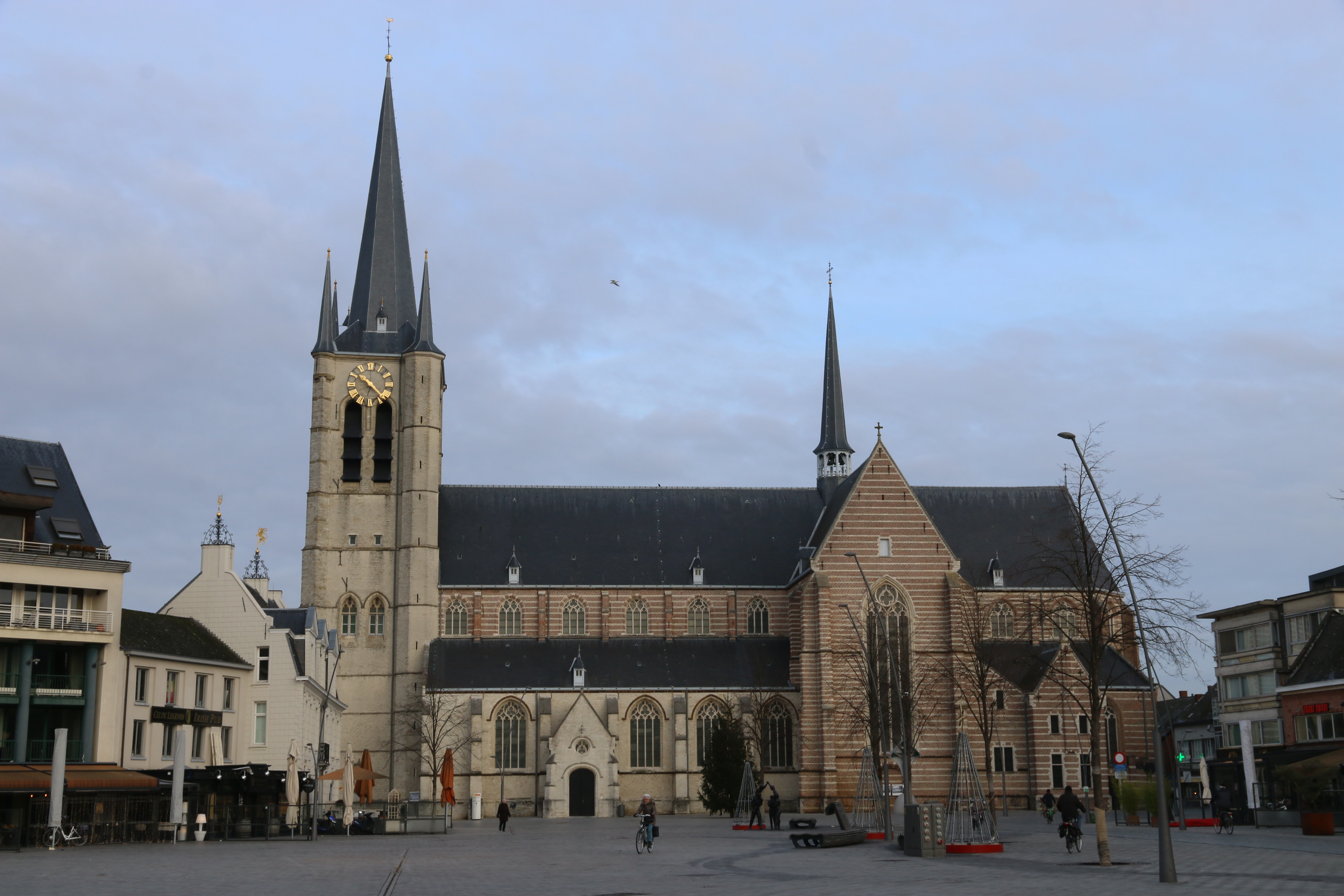
- The 'Markt' in Geel with the Church of Sint-Amands

- Flag Coat of arms

- Location of Geel in the province of Antwerp
- Interactive map of Geel
- Location in Belgium
- Coordinates: 51°10′N 05°00′E
- Country: Belgium
- Community: Flemish Community
- Region: Flemish Region
- Province: Antwerp
- Arrondissement: Turnhout

Government
  - Mayor: Marlon Pareijn (CD&V)
  - Governing parties: N-VA, CD&V

Area
  - Total: 110.19 km^{2} (42.54 sq mi)

Population (2022-01-01)
  - Total: 41,146
  - Density: 373.41/km^{2} (967.13/sq mi)
- Postal codes: 2440
- NIS code: 13008
- Area codes: 014
- Website: www.geel.be

Geel (Dutch pronunciation: [ɣeːl]) is a municipality and city located in the Belgian province of Antwerp, which acquired city status in the 1980s. It comprises Central-Geel which is composed of four old parishes or towns: Sint-Amand, Sint-Dimpna, Holven and Elsum. Further on around the center are the parish-towns of Ten Aard (N), Bel (E), Winkelomheide (SE), Stelen, Oosterlo and Zammel (S), Punt (SW) and Larum (W). In 2021, Geel had a total population of 40,781. The total area is 109.85 km^{2} (42 sq mi). Geel's patron saint, the Irish Saint Dymphna, inspired the town's pioneering de-institutionalized method of care for the mentally ill.

== History ==
=== Origins and Middle Ages ===
Archaeological finds in the area point to Iron Age settlements, but the name of Geel (until mid-20th century spelled as Gheel) hails from a Germanic root meaning "yellow" and dates from the early Middle Ages. A hamlet already existed in the mid-13th century, at which time a certain Petrus Cameracencis, canon of Cambrai, wrote the Vitae Dymphnae et S. Gereberni presbiteri ("Life of Dymphna and the priest Saint Gerebern") about an Irish woman and her tutor set in Geel according to oral tradition. The cult of the saint attracted numerous pilgrims to the area, leading to a substantial population growth: 2,136 inhabitants in 1374.

In the 12th century, the extended territory around Geel was given to the Grimbergen Abbey. It then became property of one noble family after another throughout medieval times. The noble lords or dames were masters of their community, but pledged feudal allegiance to the Dukes of Brabant. Some form of municipal government was granted to Geel as early as the first half of the 13th century. Throughout the Middle Ages to the end of the 18th century, the history of Geel follows that of the Duchy of Brabant. During all this time, the economy of the city depended on the breeding of sheep for the cloth industry, complemented by the cultivation of flax for the manufacture and trade of linen. A cloth hall was built at the beginning of the 15th century, which was later transformed into the city hall. The Eighty Years' War greatly damaged the Geel economy as well as its buildings and churches. The textile industry recovered to last until the early 19th century, but the economy was now mostly supported by agriculture, specifically rye, oat, barley, and buckwheat. Geel was also known at that time for its Latin School, which attracted students from far away to prepare them for entry at the Catholic University of Leuven.

=== From the French Revolution until today ===
In 1795, the Duchy of Brabant was dissolved and Geel made part of the French department of Deux-Nèthes, the precursor of the present province of Antwerp. The nobles and clerics of the Ancien Régime gave way to a mayor, who was now answerable to the town's people. Geel actively participated in the Belgian Revolution of 1830, resulting in the award of an honorary flag from King Leopold II. The 19th century also saw the building of several new churches at the demand of the various parishes. A major occurrence in the history of Geel is the battle of Geel (also referred to as the "Gheel bridgehead") in September 1944, one of the heaviest and bloodiest fights during the liberation of Belgium. Eventually the territory of Geel, and the smaller villages around it, were finally liberated on September 23, but it had claimed numerous military and civilian casualties.

== A model of psychiatric care ==
Geel is well known for the early adoption of de-institutionalization in psychiatric care. This practice is based on the positive effects that placement in a host family gives the patient, most importantly access to family life that would otherwise have been denied. The legendary 7th-century Saint Dymphna, who had fled to the Geel area from Ireland, is usually credited with this type of care. The earliest Geel infirmary and the model where patients go into town, interact with the community during the day, and return to the hospital at night to sleep, date from the 13th century.

Originally, this practice was religiously motivated and organized by a chapter of canons, attached to the church of Saint Dymphna. By the 18th century, however, the placement of patients was mostly done directly, without the intervention of the canons. The number of patients grew in proportion to the growing city's reputation abroad and the economic benefits flowing to the city provided further motivation to the inhabitants. Attracted by the gentle care of patients, Vincent van Gogh's father considered sending his famous son to Geel in 1880. The high point came in 1938, with a total of 3,736 placed patients, compared with only 700 a hundred years earlier.

This novel type of psychiatric care was evaluated by various other institutions around the world (see for instance Eastern State Hospital in Virginia), but often seen as too revolutionary to implement. It is only in the early 20th century that the idea of deinstitutionalization was adopted more widely elsewhere. Today, a modern psychiatric centre stands on the place of the old infirmary, and close to 500 patients are still placed with inhabitants.

The fact that people with mental illness are living with relatively non-judgmental (formerly) strangers and not with family members has been cited as a partial explanation of the success of this model, because it creates an environment that avoids emotional over-involvement, critical comments, and hostility (measured collectively in psychiatry as "expressed emotion"). Another aspect cited as helpful is that people with mental illness are allowed to live their lives relatively freely, without being labelled as "broken" or "in recovery".

== Sights ==
- The market square, facing the Sint-Amands church and bordered by attractive café terraces, is the focal point of the city. The oldest part of the city hall dates from the 17th century. Not far away, the Sint-Dimpna church marks the place where the saint was buried.
- Geel is located along the river Nete, in the Campine region noted for varied landscape of forests and dunes.
- Nature reserve De Zegge, belonging to the society which owns the Antwerp Zoo.
- Among the city's attractions one counts a field of orchids, a centenary linden tree, three wind mills, a military cemetery, and a handful a museums including a clock museum, a lamp museum, and an old bakery. The Saint-Alexis college is emblazoned with Art Nouveau sgraffiti by Gabriel Van Dievoet.

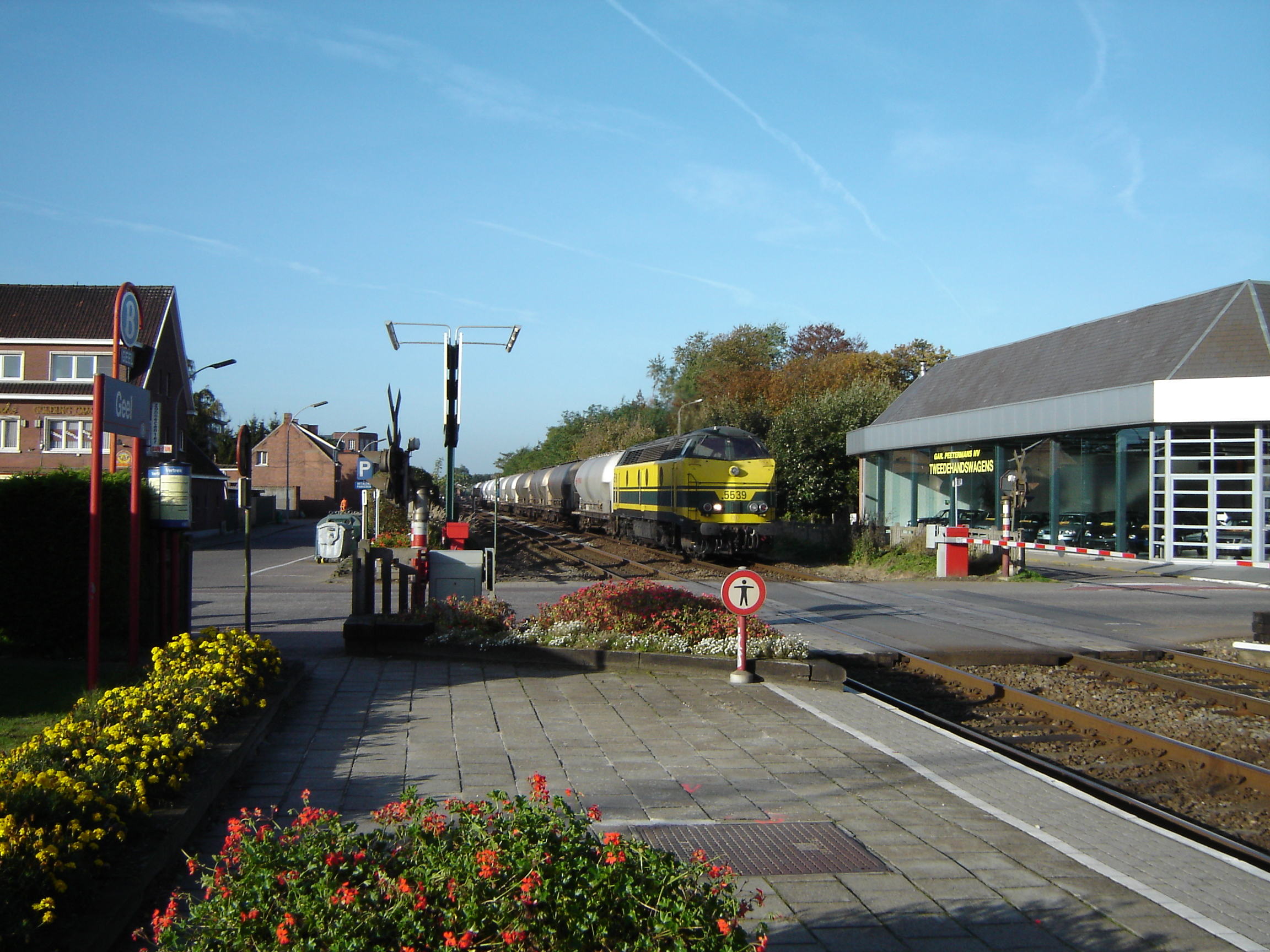
Geel train station

== Education ==
Geel is a regional educational centre with several basic schools and high schools. It hosts campuses from Thomas More University College and KU Leuven as institutes for higher education.

The European School, Mol is in Mol, near Geel.

== Economic activity ==
Geel is a regional agricultural, industrial, and commercial center offering medical and educational services to the neighboring communities. The city is the location of a Janssen Pharmaceutica chemical factory and a production site for the biotech company Genzyme. It also hosts the Institute for Reference Materials and Measurements, which is one of the seven scientific institutes of the European Commission's Joint Research Centre. CIPAL, an inter-municipal ICT organization, has its head office located in Geel. The town is also the home of the influential Brandweerinformatiecentrum voor gevaarlijke stoffen/Information Centre for Dangerous Goods (BIG).

== Sports and cultural events ==
- Geel is home to the former football club K.F.C. Verbroedering Geel. Due to bankruptcy, Verbroedering Geel merged with the local football club of the neighbouring village of Meerhout. The newly created football club was named Verbroedering Geel-Meerhout.
- The Reggae Geel festival, one of the larger reggae festivals in Europe, takes place usually early in August just outside the city centre.

== Notable people ==
- Maarten Peeters, painter and publisher (1500–1566)
- Eddy Bertels, footballer (1932–2011)
- Patrik Vankrunkelsven, physician and politician (b. 1957)
- Eddy Voordeckers, footballer (b. 1960)
- Ludo Dierckxsens, racing cyclist (1964–2025)
- Anja Daems, radio and television presenter (b. 1968)
- Marc Goossens, race car driver (b. 1969)
- Natalia, singer (b. 1980)
- Jef Neve, composer (b. 1977)
- Kathleen Aerts, singer (b. 1978)
- Filip Daems, footballer (b. 1978)
- Jan Heylen, racecar driver (b. 1980)
- Sepp De Roover, footballer (b. 1984)
- Kevin Strijbos, motocross racer (b. 1985)
- Kirsten Flipkens, tennis player (b. 1986)
- Tobe Leysen, footballer (b. 2002)
- Fedde Leysen, footballer (b. 2003)

== International relations ==
=== Twin towns — Sister cities ===
Geel is twinned with:

- Ireland: Tydavnet, County Monaghan
- Germany: Xanten

== Climate ==
Climate data for Geel (1991−2020 normals)
Month	Jan	Feb	Mar	Apr	May	Jun	Jul	Aug	Sep	Oct	Nov	Dec	Year
Mean daily maximum °C (°F)	6.5 (43.7)	7.5 (45.5)	11.2 (52.2)	15.6 (60.1)	19.2 (66.6)	22.0 (71.6)	24.0 (75.2)	23.8 (74.8)	20.2 (68.4)	15.4 (59.7)	10.3 (50.5)	6.9 (44.4)	15.2 (59.4)
Daily mean °C (°F)	3.6 (38.5)	4.0 (39.2)	6.8 (44.2)	10.1 (50.2)	13.9 (57.0)	16.8 (62.2)	18.8 (65.8)	18.3 (64.9)	15.1 (59.2)	11.2 (52.2)	7.1 (44.8)	4.2 (39.6)	10.8 (51.4)
Mean daily minimum °C (°F)	0.7 (33.3)	0.6 (33.1)	2.4 (36.3)	4.6 (40.3)	8.6 (47.5)	11.6 (52.9)	13.6 (56.5)	12.9 (55.2)	10.0 (50.0)	7.0 (44.6)	3.8 (38.8)	1.5 (34.7)	6.5 (43.7)
Average precipitation mm (inches)	69.3 (2.73)	63.1 (2.48)	57.3 (2.26)	42.9 (1.69)	58.0 (2.28)	75.4 (2.97)	80.4 (3.17)	78.6 (3.09)	66.0 (2.60)	66.7 (2.63)	74.6 (2.94)	88.4 (3.48)	820.7 (32.31)
Average precipitation days (≥ 1.0 mm)	12.8	11.5	11.0	8.7	10.0	10.4	11.0	10.8	9.9	11.1	12.9	13.9	134.2
Mean monthly sunshine hours	61	76	132	185	214	214	220	205	160	116	66	50	1,700
Source: Royal Meteorological Institute
