= Sonsbeck =

- Municipality
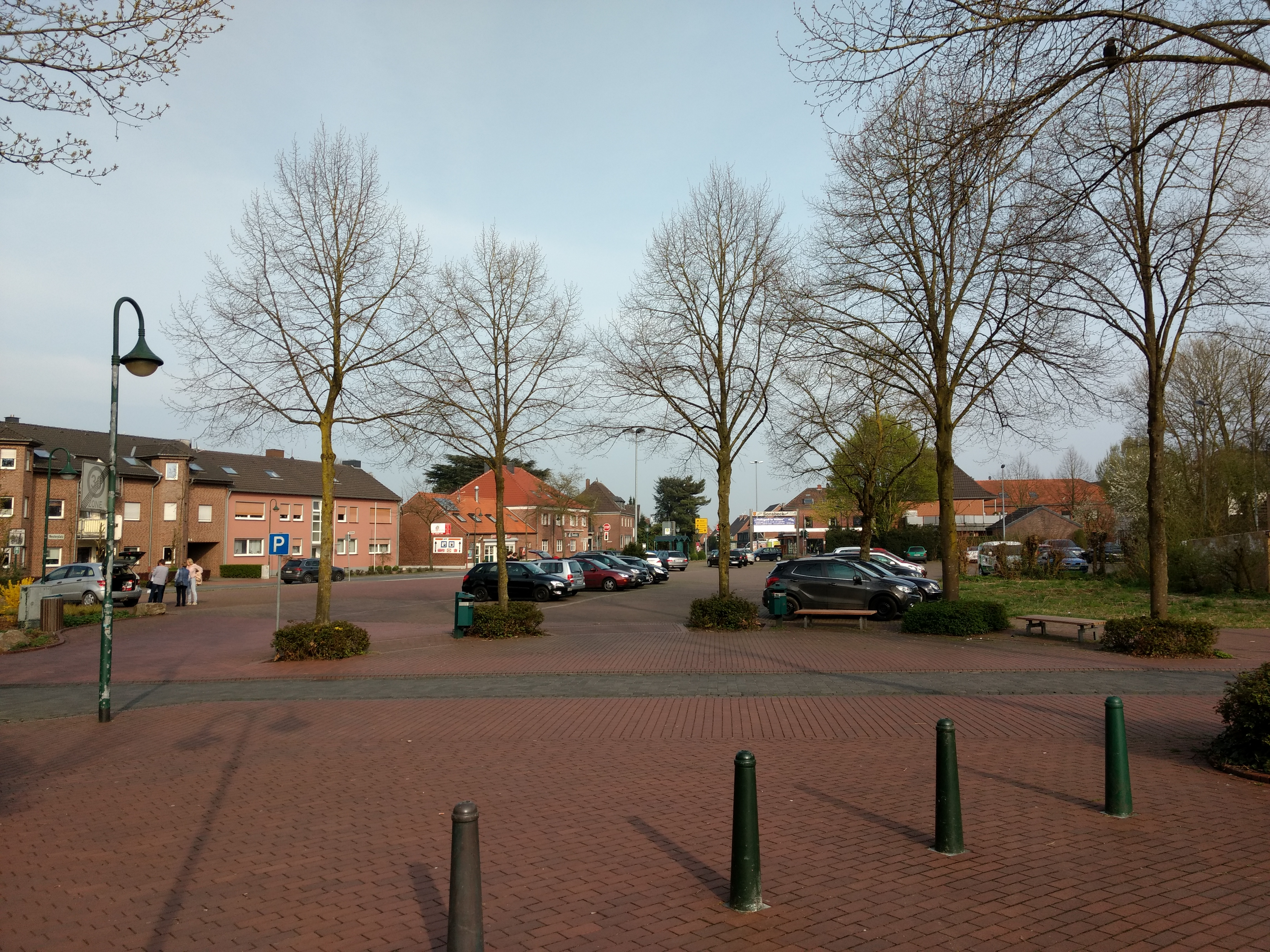

- Coat of arms

- Location of Sonsbeck within Wesel district
- Interactive map of Sonsbeck
- Location within Germany Location within North Rhine-Westphalia
- Coordinates: 51°36′32″N 06°22′37″E
- Country: Germany
- State: North Rhine-Westphalia
- Admin. region: Düsseldorf
- District: Wesel
- Subdivisions: 3

Government
  - Mayor (2020–25): Heiko Schmidt (CDU)

Area
  - Total: 55.41 km^{2} (21.39 sq mi)
- Elevation: 25 m (82 ft)

Population (2025-12-31)
  - Total: 8,628
  - Density: 155.7/km^{2} (403.3/sq mi)
- Time zone: UTC+01:00 (CET)
  - Summer (DST): UTC+02:00 (CEST)
- Postal codes: 47665
- Dialling codes: 0 28 38
- Vehicle registration: WES
- Website: www.sonsbeck.de

Sonsbeck (German pronunciation: [ˈzɔnsbɛk]) is a municipality in the district of Wesel, in North Rhine-Westphalia, Germany. It is situated approximately 20 km west of Wesel, and 25 km south-east of Cleves as well as 8 km from the historic city of Xanten.

It is one of North Rhine-Westphalia's wealthiest municipalities.

== History ==
=== Antiquity ===
A watchtower was constructed on the Balberg by the Romans for protection of the road between Castra Vetera (near modern Xanten) and Blerick (Netherlands). The area around Sonsbeck was settled by the Germanic Cugernii tribe.

=== Middle Ages ===
The watchtower of the Romans was later reconstructed as a keep for the Dukes of Cleves. The remaining round tower (c. 1417) is called "Römerturm" (Roman tower) today, in reference to its early history.

In close proximity to the watchtower, the first settlement Suangochesboch emerged. The name of the settlement has two possible origins; the first from Latin "sus" (= pig) and the second from the Low German word "soneman" (= arbiter), so the name means either "Schweinebach" ("pig stream") or the stream where the arbiter resides.

Sonsbeck became a place of pilgrimage, when a chapel was constructed to preserve the relics of the martyr Gerebernus. Gerebernus is said to have been an Irish priest of the 6th or 7th century, who was the tutor of Dymphna, the daughter of an Irish tribal king. After the death of her mother, the king wanted to marry his daughter, wo fled to Geel (Belgium) with her tutor Gerebernus, where they were captured and beheaded. The remains were later stolen by "bandits from Xanten" and arrived in Sonsbeck.

The Sonsbeck chapel was elevated to parish status in 1203. Close to the chapel, a second settlement developed, which took the name of the already existing settlement and received town privileges in 1320 from Count Dietrich IX. of Cleves. In the following years, the construction of walls around the city began, they were finished in 1420 and included a keep for the Counts/Dukes of Cleves. The keep was destroyed in 1641.

The most important remaining monument from that time is the St.-Mary-Magdalene-Church that was finished in 1431.

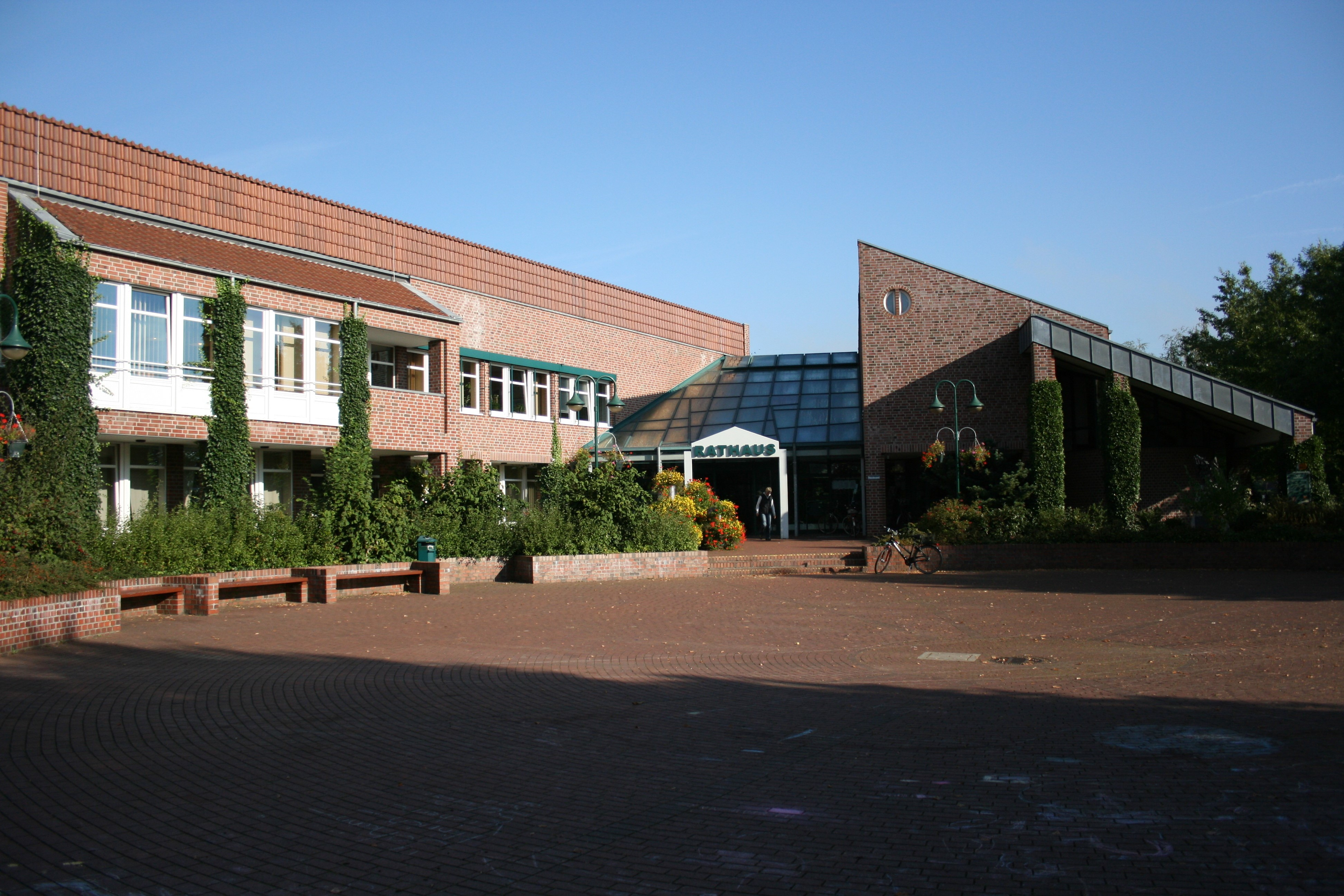
Sonsbeck Town hall (Rathaus)

== Population ==
Historical population

Year	Pop.	±% p.a.
1965	5,678	—
1970	5,992	+1.08%
1975	6,258	+0.87%
1980	6,669	+1.28%
1985	6,578	−0.27%
1990	6,962	+1.14%
1995	7,346	+1.08%

Year	Pop.	±% p.a.
2000	8,347	+2.59%
2005	8,671	+0.76%
2010	8,596	−0.17%
2015	8,819	+0.51%
2020	8,690	−0.29%
2025	8,628	−0.14%

Source: Landesdatabank Nordrhein-Westfalen

== Twin towns ==
Sonsbeck is twinned with the town of Sandwich in Kent (UK).

== Noted residents ==
- Adolph Althoff, (1913–1998), circus owner who rescued Jews during the Holocaust
