= Thorsten Hoffmann =

German politician

Member of the Bundestag
- In office 2015–2017

Personal details
- Born: 5 February 1961 (age 65) Castrop-Rauxel, West Germany
- Citizenship: German
- Party: CDU
- Occupation: Police officer

Thorsten Hoffmann (born 5 February 1961) is a German politician of the Christian Democratic Union (CDU) from Dortmund. From 2015 to 2017, he was a member of the Bundestag.

== Career ==
In 1980, Hoffmann joined the police service. Two years later, he entered intermediate police service. In 1990, he graduated from College for Public Administration in Dortmund with a Master of Public Administration degree. Thereupon, he entered the higher police service. Hoffmann was employed at the investigation department of the Dortmund police, before changing to the State Offices of Criminal Investigation of Thuringia and Bavaria in 1995. From 1995 to 2014 he worked at Dortmund police as investigator and as coordinator between the city council and the police headquarters.

== Political career ==
Hoffmann became a member of the Christian Democratic Union in 1999. From 2004 to 2009 he was a member of the district council of Dortmund-Hombruch. In 2009, he was elected into Dortmund city council, of which he is still a member. Since 2011, he has been the chairman of the Christian Democratic Union in the district of Dortmund-Hombruch and in the urban quarter of Dortmund-Kirchhörde.

In the 2013 federal election, Hoffmann received 30.7% of all direct votes cast within his electoral district No. 142 (Dortmund I), which makes him the most successful candidate of the Christian Democratic Union in this electoral district ever. From 2015, he served as a member of the German Bundestag. He succeeded Ronald Pofalla who decided to retire from parliament. He was a member of the Committee of Internal Affairs and a deputy member of the Committee of Petitions.

In 2019, Minister-President Armin Laschet of North Rhine-Westphalia appointed Hoffmann as State Commissioner for Police Affairs; in this capacity, he serves as an ombudsman for the state's police forces.

== Other activities ==
- Gewerkschaft der Polizei, Member
- Christian Democratic Employees' Association (CDA), Member

== Political positions ==
In June 2017, Hoffmann voted against his parliamentary group’s majority and in favor of Germany's introduction of same-sex marriage.
