= Jochen van Aerssen =

German politician

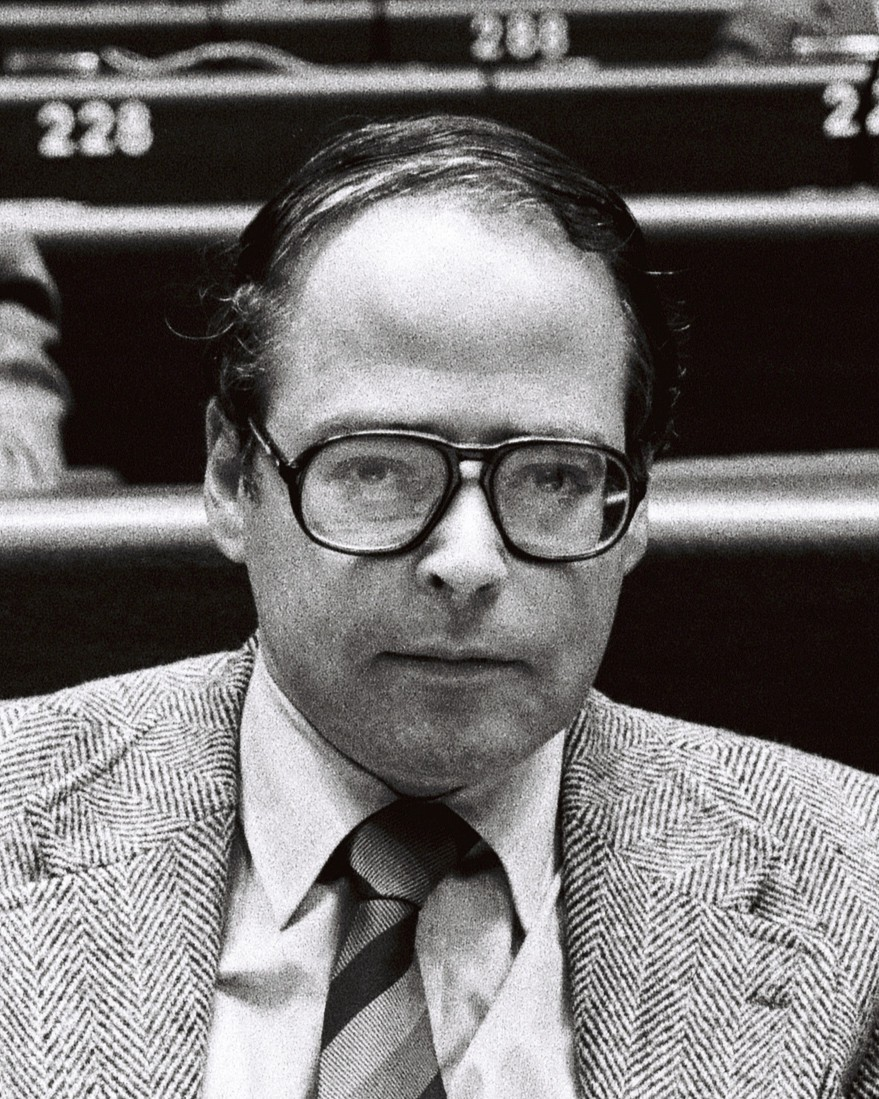
- Van Aerssen in 1981

Member of the Bundestag
- In office 14 December 1976 – 29 March 1983

Personal details
- Born: 15 April 1941 Kevelaer
- Died: 19 January 1992 (aged 50) Düsseldorf, North Rhine-Westphalia, Germany
- Party: CDU

Jochen van Aerssen (15 April 1941 – 19 January 1992) was a German politician of the Christian Democratic Union (CDU) and former member of the German Bundestag.

== Life ==
Van Aerssen joined the CDU in 1964, he had been a member of the Kleve district executive of the CDU since 1970 and became a member of the Rhineland regional executive of the CDU in 1973 as Commissioner for European Affairs. As a successor to Wilhelm Wehren, van Aerssen was a member of the North Rhine-Westphalian state parliament from 26 July 1970 to 13 December 1976, where he was chairman of the committee for state planning from 1973 to 1975. From 14 December 1976 to 29 March 1983, he was a member of the German Bundestag for two terms. He was directly elected in 1976 and 1980 in the Kleve constituency. In addition, he was a member of the European Parliament from 19 January 1977 to 24 July 1989, where he was a member of various committees with a foreign trade orientation.

== Literature ==
Herbst, Ludolf; Jahn, Bruno (2002). Vierhaus, Rudolf (ed.). Biographisches Handbuch der Mitglieder des Deutschen Bundestages. 1949–2002 [Biographical Handbook of the Members of the German Bundestag. 1949–2002] (in German). München: De Gruyter - De Gruyter Saur. p. 1715. ISBN 978-3-11-184511-1.
