= Stefan Rouenhoff =

German politician

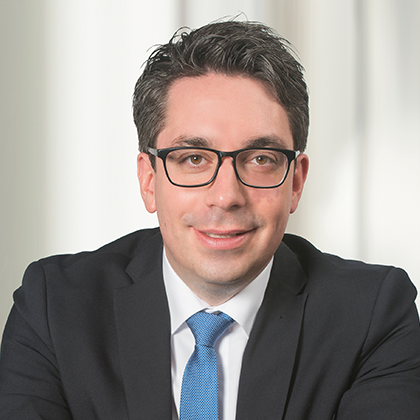
- Stefan Rouenhoff in 2017

Member of the Bundestag
- Incumbent
- Assumed office 2017

Personal details
- Born: 23 December 1978 (age 47) Goch, West Germany (now Germany)
- Party: CDU
- Education: University of Birmingham

Stefan Rouenhoff (born 23 December 1978) is a German politician of the Christian Democratic Union (CDU) who has been serving as a member of the Bundestag from the state of North Rhine-Westphalia since 2017.

In addition to his work in parliament, Rouenhoff has been serving as Parliamentary State Secretary at the Federal Ministry for Economic Affairs in the government of Chancellor Friedrich Merz since 2025.

== Early career ==
From 2010 until 2017, Rouenhoff worked in various capacities at the Federal Ministry for Economic Affairs and Technology. During that time, he served as one of the ministries spokespeople from 2012 until 2014. From 2014 until 2017, he was seconded to the Permanent Representation of Germany to the European Union in Brussels.

== Political career ==
Rouenhoff became a member of the Bundestag in the 2017 German federal election. In parliament, he is a member of the Committee on Economic Affairs and Energy. In that capacity, he serves as his parliamentary group's rapporteur on foreign trade, Brexit and taxes.
