= Edward Bertels =

Belgian footballer

Personal information
- Date of birth: 8 October 1932
- Place of birth: Geel, Belgium
- Date of death: 9 March 2011 (aged 78)
- Positions: Midfielder; forward

Youth career
- Antwerp

Senior career*
Years	Team	Apps	(Gls)
1950–1962	Antwerp	271	(136)
1962–1964	Thor Waterschei		
1964–1965	Turnhout		
1965–1971	Schilde SK		

International career
1951–1953	Belgium U19	6	(0)
1960	Belgium	2	(0)

Managerial career
- KAV Dendermonde
- Eendracht Zele
- Schilde SK
- Wijnegem VC
- SC City Pirates Antwerpen
- K Kontich FC
- * Club domestic league appearances and goals

Edward Bertels (8 October 1932 – 9 March 2011) was a Belgian footballer. He played in two matches for the Belgium national football team in 1960.

== Honours ==
=== Club ===
Antwerp

- Belgian First Division A: 1956–57
- Belgian First Division A runner-up: 1955–56, 1957–58, 1962–63
- Belgian Cup: 1954–55

Waterschei

- Belgian Third Division: 1963–1964
