= Saint Dymphna =

7th-century Irish Christian martyr

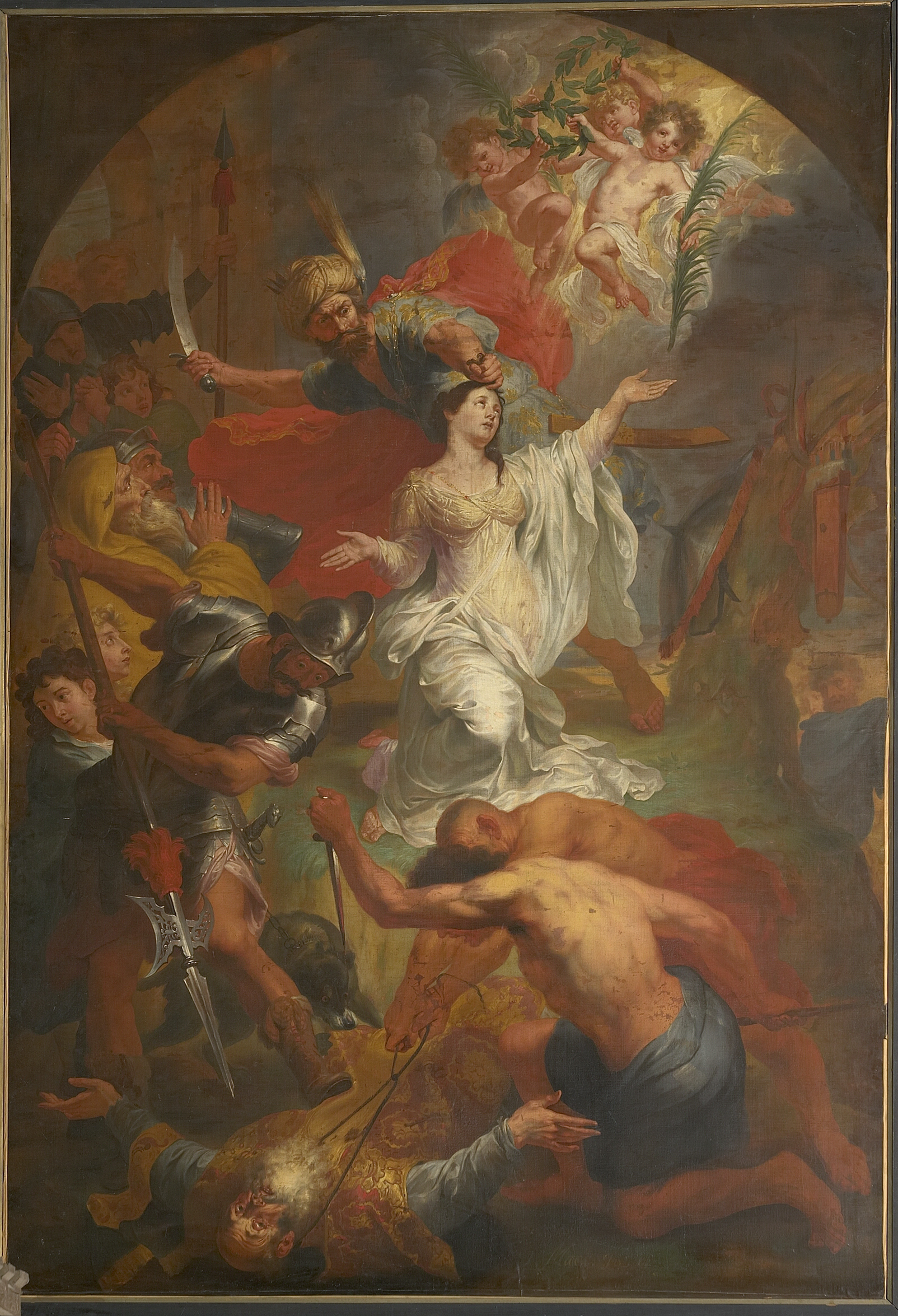
- The beheading of Saint Dymphna by Godfried Maes

Virgin martyr
- Born: 7th century Ireland
- Died: 30 May, 7th century Geel, Belgium
- Venerated in: Catholic Church; Eastern Orthodox Church
- Feast: 30 May; (formerly 15 May)
- Attributes: Lamp, sword (with which she was beheaded), lilies
- Patronage: Mental health, those suffering from mental illnesses

Saint Dymphna (also Dimpna, Dymfna, Dimfna, Dympna and Dympha, Irish also Damhnait or Davnet) is honoured in Catholic and Eastern Orthodox traditions. According to tradition, she lived in the 7th century and was martyred by her father.

The life of Dymphna was first recorded in the 13th century by a canon of the Church of Aubert of Avranches at Cambrai, France. It was commissioned by Guiard of Laon, the Bishop of Cambrai (1238–1248).

== Name ==
Dymphna's name (pronounced /ˈdɪmfnə/ DIMF-nə or /ˈdɪmpnə/ DIMP-nə) derives from the Irish damh ('poet') and suffix -nait ('little' or 'feminine'), therefore meaning 'poetess'. It is also spelled Dimpna, Dymphnart, Dympna or Damnat; this last spelling is closer to the Irish spelling Damhnait (pronounced [ˈd̪ˠəunˠətʲ]).

== Story of her life and death ==
According to Catholic and Orthodox tradition, Dymphna was born in Ireland in the seventh century. Dymphna's father Damon was a petty king of Oriel. Her mother was a devout Christian.

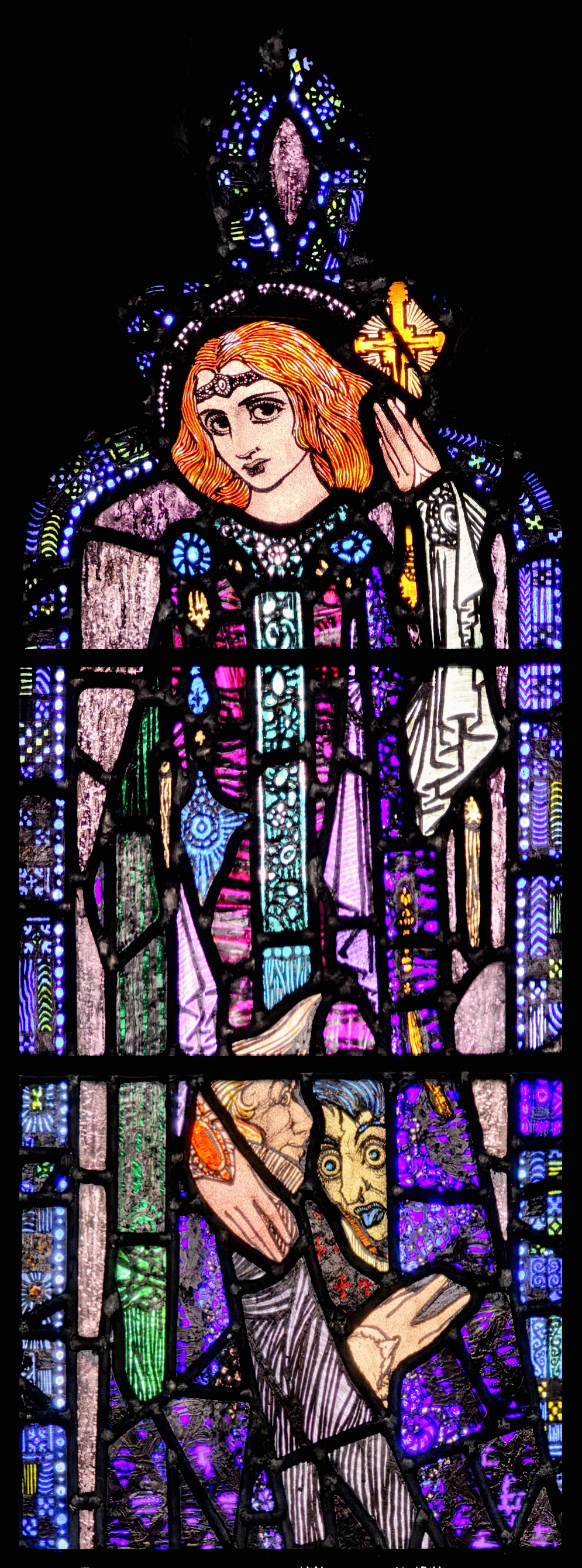
St Dymphna by Harry Clarke, with mad figures hiding in her cloak

When Dymphna was 14 years old, she consecrated herself to Christ and took a vow of chastity. Shortly thereafter, her mother died. Damon had loved his wife deeply, and in the aftermath of her death his mental health sharply deteriorated. Eventually the king's counsellors pressed him to remarry. Damon agreed, but only on the condition that his bride would be as beautiful as his deceased wife. After searching fruitlessly, Damon began to desire his daughter because of her strong resemblance to her mother.

When Dymphna learned of her father's intentions, she swore to uphold her vows and fled his court along with her confessor Father Gerebernus, two trusted servants, and the king's fool. Together they sailed towards the Continent, eventually landing in what is present-day Belgium, where they took refuge in the town of Geel.

One tradition states that once settled in Geel, Dymphna built a hospice for the poor and sick of the region. However, it was through the use of her wealth that her father would eventually ascertain her whereabouts, as some of the coins used enabled her father to trace them to Belgium. Damon sent his agents to pursue his daughter and her companions. When their hiding place was discovered, Damon travelled to Geel to recover his daughter. Damon ordered his soldiers to kill Gerebernus and tried to force Dymphna to return with him to Ireland, but she resisted. Furious, Damon drew his sword and struck off his daughter's head. She was said to have been 15 years old when she died. After Dymphna and Gerebernus were killed, the residents of Geel buried them in a nearby cave. Years later, they decided to move the remains to a more suitable location.

In 1349, a church honouring Dymphna was built in Geel. By 1480, so many pilgrims were coming from all over Europe, seeking treatment for psychiatric disorders that the church housing for them was expanded. Soon the sanctuary for those considered "mad" was again full to overflowing, and the townspeople began taking them into their own homes. Thus began a tradition for the ongoing care of those with psychiatric conditions that has endured for over 500 years, and is still studied and admired today. Patients were, and still are, taken into the homes of Geel's inhabitants. Never called patients, they are called boarders, and are treated as ordinary and useful members of the town. They are treated as members of the host family. They work, most often in menial labour, and in return, they become part of the community. Some stay a few months, some decades, some for their entire lives. At its peak in the 1930s, over 4,000 'boarders' were housed with the town's inhabitants.

== Veneration ==
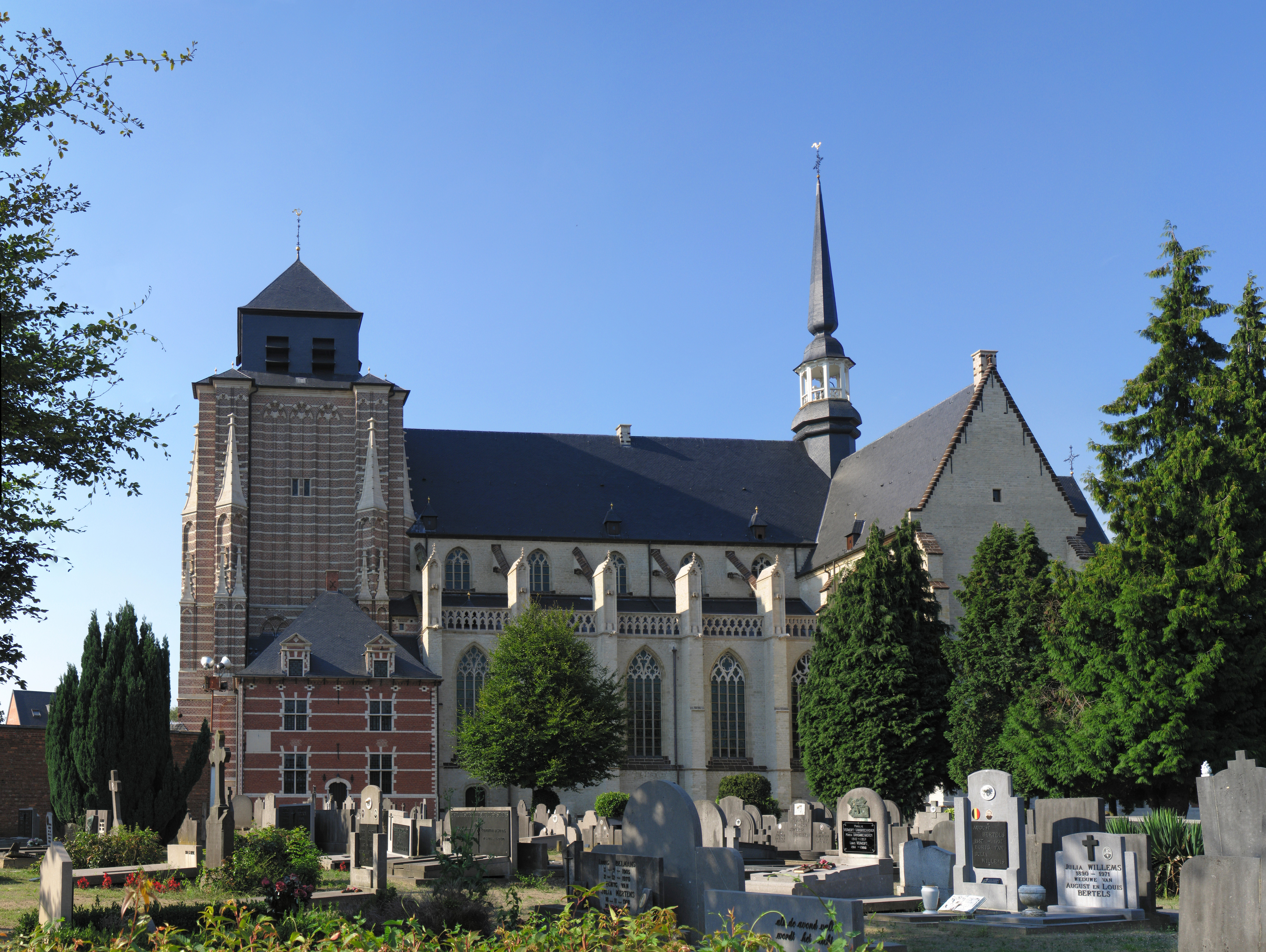
St. Dymphna Church, Geel, Belgium

The remains of Dymphna were later put into a silver reliquary and placed in a church in Geel named in her honour. The remains of Gerebernus were moved to Xanten, Germany. The church still stands on the site where her body is believed to have first been buried.

Dymphna was beheaded on 30 May, although the year of her death is uncertain. A transfer of her relics occurred on 15 May of a subsequent year, the anniversary of which became her primary feast day until the 21st century, when the post-conciliar Roman Martyrology (the authoritative compendium of feast days for the Roman Rite of the Catholic Church) assigned Dymphna's feast to the anniversary of her martyrdom, on 30 May, as listed in the 2004 edition.

Dymphna is known as the Lily of Éire, due to her spotless virtue. She is traditionally portrayed wearing a crown, dressed in ermine and royal robes, and holding a sword. In modern versions she holds the sword awkwardly, as it symbolises her martyrdom, but in the older versions seen on numerous statues and stained glass images, her sword is pricking the neck of a demon; symbolising her title of Demon Slayer. She is also often portrayed holding a lamp, with the chained devil at her feet.

Some modern holy cards portray Dymphna in green and white, holding a book and white lilies.

During the 2022 season, the St Dymphna's Church, in Geel, Belgium, commemorated her by hosting an exposition showing the restored altarpiece venerating Dymphna by Goossen Van der Weyden.

== Patronage ==
Dymphna is the patron saint of mental health.

The US National Shrine of St. Dymphna is located inside St. Mary's Catholic Church in Massillon, Ohio. The shrine was destroyed by a fire in 2015, but reopened in December 2016 and is still open to pilgrims and visitors. St. Dymphna's Special School is located in Ballina, County Mayo, Ireland and operates under the patronage of Western Care Association.

== In art ==
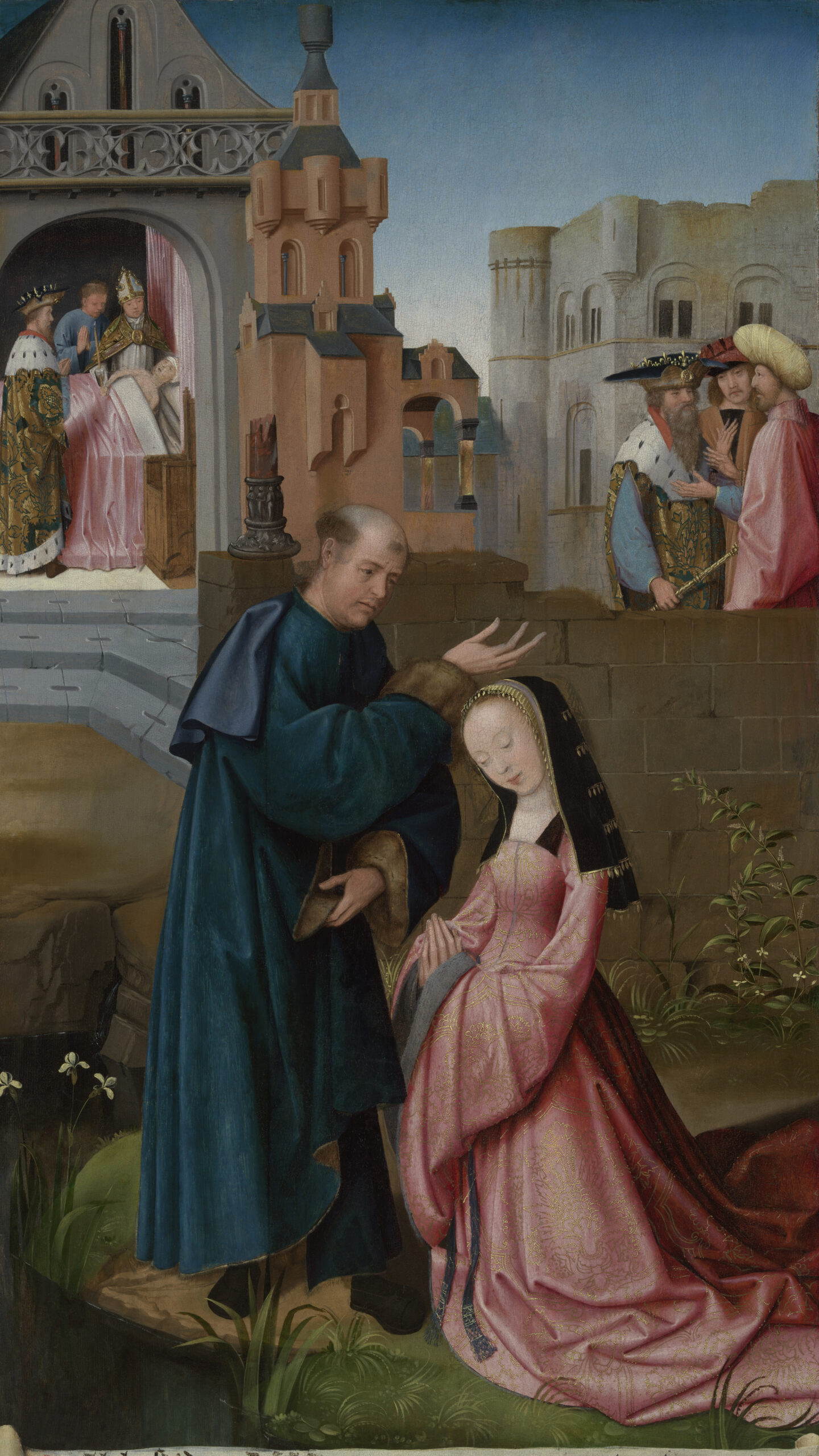
Goossen van der Weyden, Altarpiece of Saint Dymphna (1505), detail

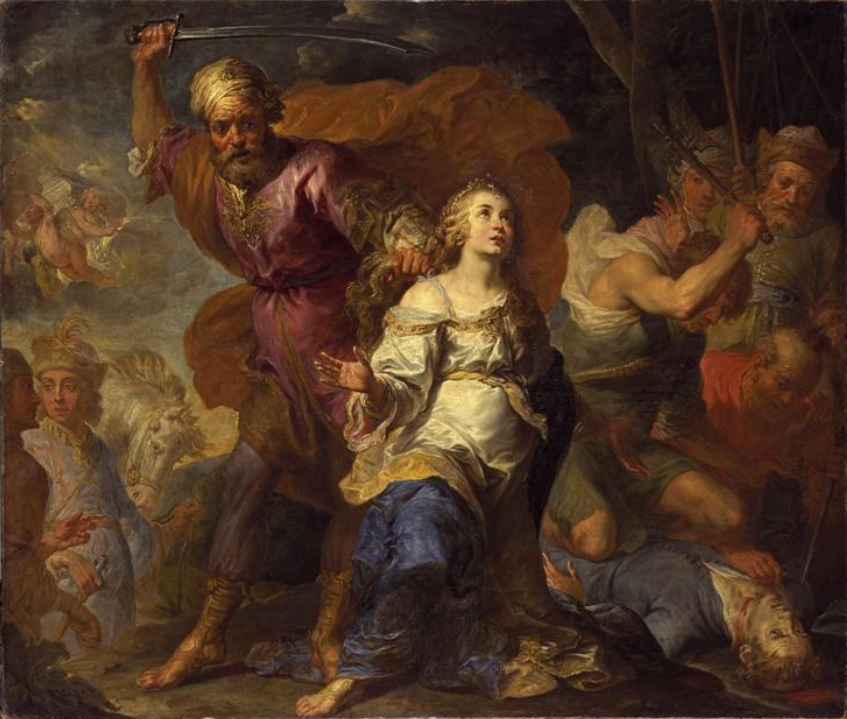
Jacques de l'Ange, Martyrdom of Saint Dymphna and Saint Gerebernus (1603–1651)

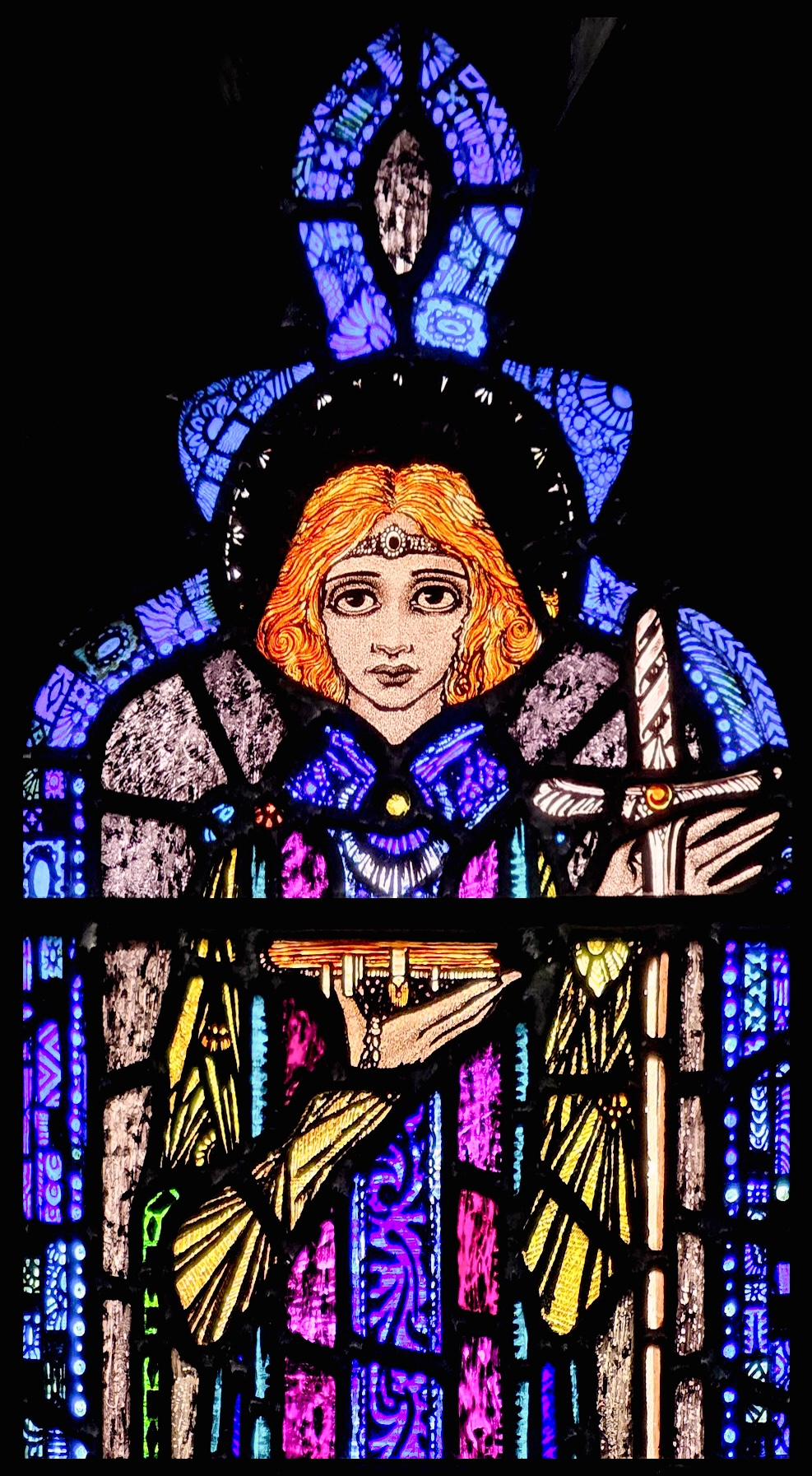
Harry Clarke and The Tower of Glass Studio, stained glass window of St. Dymphna (1925), detail

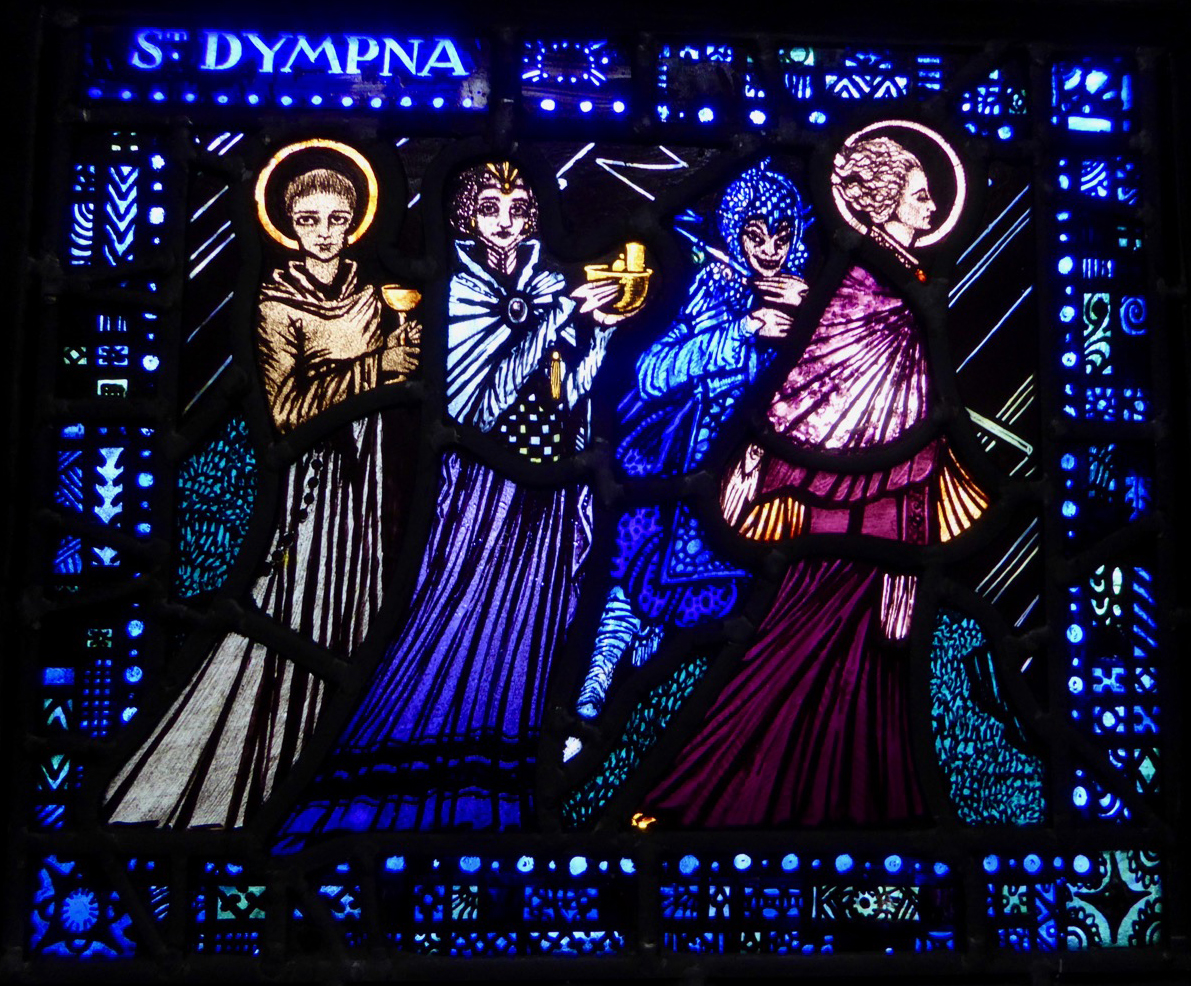
Harry Clarke and The Tower of Glass Studio, stained glass window of St. Dymphna (1925), detail

== See also ==
- List of Catholic saints
