= Bertel =

Bertel is a Scandinavian male given name. Notable people named Bertel include:

- Bertel Backman (1906–1981), Finnish speed skater who competed in the 1928 Winter Olympics
- Bertel Dahlgaard (1887–1972), Danish politician, member of Folketinget for the Social Liberal Party 1920–1960, and statistician
- Bertel Flaten (1900–1963), Norwegian politician for the Liberal Party
- Bertel Haarder (born 1944), Danish politician
- Bertel Jung (1872–1946), Finnish architect and urban planner
- Bertel Lauring (1928–2000), Danish film actor
- Bertel Thorvaldsen (1770–1844), Danish / Icelandic sculptor

== See also ==
- Bertel O. Steen, Norwegian conglomerate with main focus on automotive retailing and import
- Dick Bertel, born Dick Bertelmann, a radio and TV personality 1950s to 1980s, and an executive producer for the Voice of America
- Perttu (name), a Finnish given name variant
