= Martin Frey =

German politician (1904–1971)

Member of the Bundestag
- In office 7 September 1949 – 7 September 1953
- In office 15 October 1957 – 19 October 1969

Personal details
- Born: 7 December 1904
- Died: 5 November 1971 (aged 66) North Rhine-Westphalia, Germany
- Party: CDU

Martin Frey (7 December 1904 – 5 November 1971) was a German politician of the Christian Democratic Union (CDU) and former member of the German Bundestag.

== Life ==
Frey was first elected to the German Bundestag in 1949. In the constituency of Geldern-Kleve, he received 60.0% of the valid votes cast and thus entered parliament as a directly elected member. He was not a direct candidate in the next Bundestag election in 1953 and was not elected via the state list. From 1957 to 1969 he was again a member of the Bundestag, where he now always entered via his party's North Rhine-Westphalian state list.

== Literature ==
Herbst, Ludolf; Jahn, Bruno (2002). Vierhaus, Rudolf (ed.). Biographisches Handbuch der Mitglieder des Deutschen Bundestages. 1949–2002 [Biographical Handbook of the Members of the German Bundestag. 1949–2002] (in German). München: De Gruyter - De Gruyter Saur. p. 1715. ISBN 978-3-11-184511-1.
