= Gerebern =

Irish priest who baptized St. Dymphna

Saint Gerebern
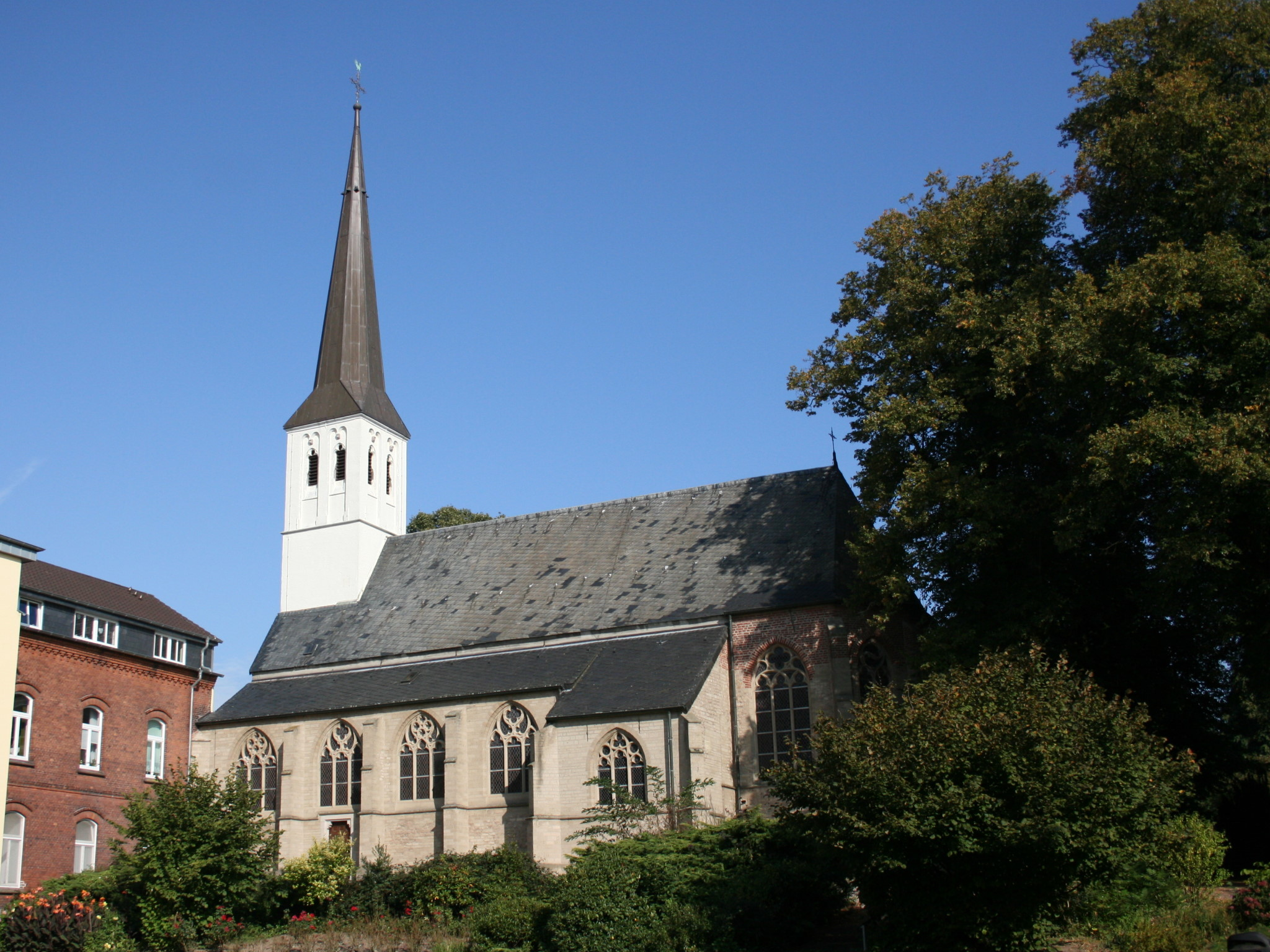
- Chapel of Saint Gerebernus in Sonsbeck
- Born: 7th century Ireland
- Died: 7th century Geel, Belgium
- Canonized: Pre-congregation
- Feast: 15 May
- Attributes: Palm and lance
- Patronage: against fever, gout; in Sonsbeck, Germany

Saint Gerebern (or Gerebernus, Genebern, Genebrard, Gereborn, Gerebran, Gerebrand, Herbern; died 7th century) was an Irish priest who baptized Saint Dymphna when she was a child. He was her companion when she fled to Belgium, where he was murdered beside her. His relics were taken to Sonsbeck in Germany, where they were an object of pilgrimage until they were destroyed during World War II. His feast day is 15 May.

== Life ==
According to the biography Vitae Dymphnae et S. Gereberni presbiteri (English: Life Dymphna and St. Gerebern priest), which Peter of Cambrai, a canon of the Abbey of St-Géry-et-Aubert in Cambrai, recorded in the 13th century, Gerebernus was an Irish priest who lived in the 6th or 7th centuries. He was the tutor of Saint Dymphna, the daughter of an Irish tribal king. After her mother's death, the king wanted Dymphna to marry. She then fled with Gerebern to Geel in what is now Belgium, where they were discovered and beheaded by the king.

According to legend, both Dymphnas and Gerebernus' bones were stolen from Geel in their coffins by "robbers from Xanten". According to popular belief, the stealing of the bones of saints was not considered theft, as they could only be stolen if the saint agreed. However, Dymphna's bones could no longer be moved on the way to Xanten, and some citizens of Geel are said to have pursued the "robbers", so that they took some of Gerebernus' bones from the coffin and fled. Only a few kilometers before Xanten, in the area of today's Sonsbeck, Gerebernus' bones could no longer be moved, so they were buried there and a chapel was built for him.

== Legacy ==
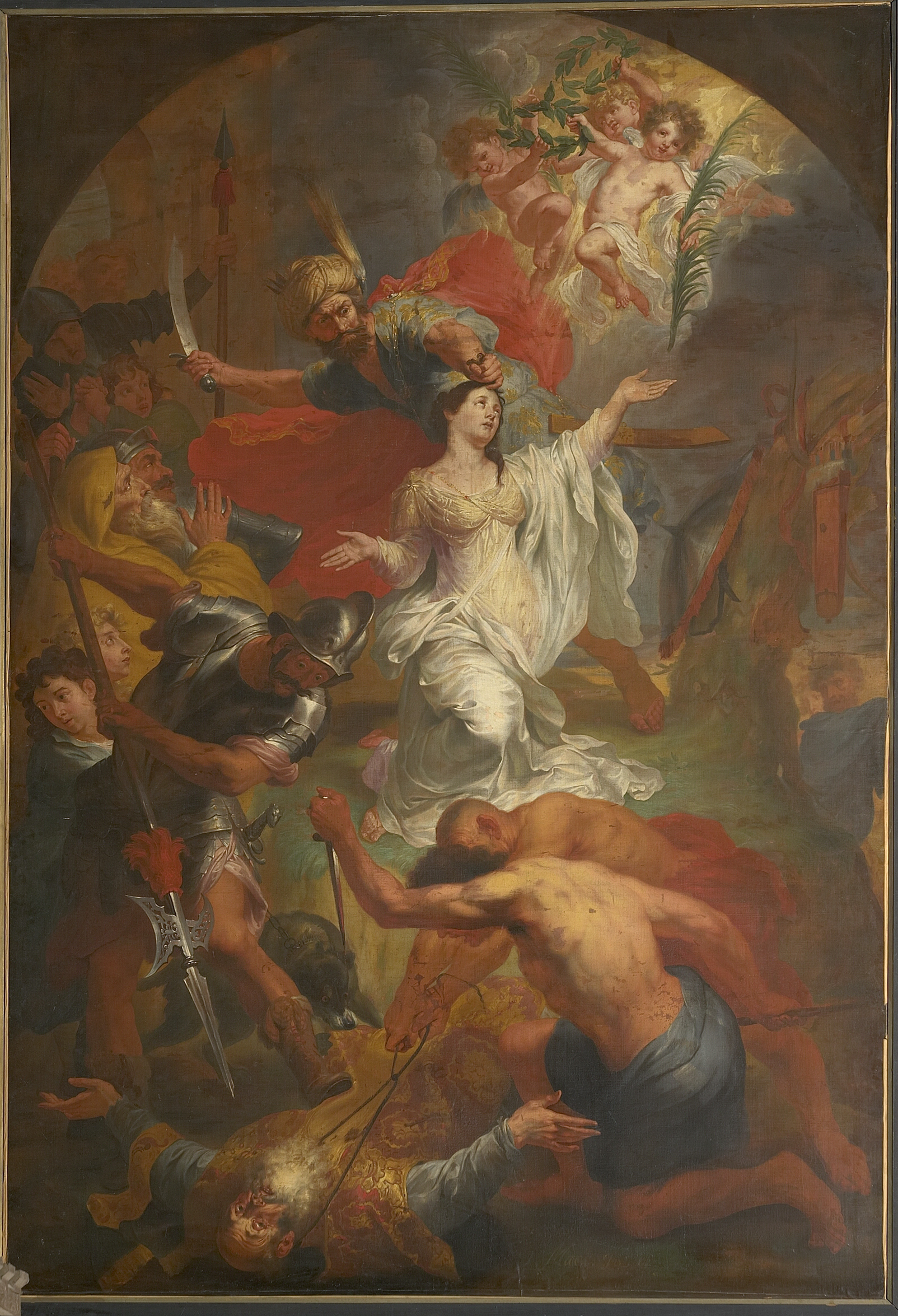
The beheading of Saint Dymphna by Godfried Maes (1688). The murder of Gerebern is shown below.

Reports about miracles that happened at the grave of St. Gerebernus triggered pilgrimages there. The pilgrimage to St. Gerebern continued in the 18th century. The pilgrimage ended with the destruction of Sonsbeck by bombing in 1945 during World War II.

Gerebernus is usually depicted as a bearded priest. His iconographic saints' attributes are palm and lance. St. Gerebernus is considered the patron saint against chiragra (gout-related pain in the wrist), paralysis and epilepsy. His Catholic feast day is May 15. Sometimes July 13 is also mentioned as a day of remembrance.

== Monks of Ramsgate account ==
The Monks of Ramsgate wrote in their Book of Saints (1921),

Gerebern (Gerebrand) (St.) M. (May 15)
(7th cent.) Saint Gerebern or Gerebrand was the Irish priest who accompanied Saint Dympna in her flight to Belgium, and who was privileged to share with her her crown of Martyrdom at Gheel in that country. They suffered some time in the seventh century, but the records are very imperfect. Saint Gerebern is Patron Saint of a village in Rhenish Prussia, where his relics are enshrined.

== Butler's account ==
The hagiographer Alban Butler (1710–1773) wrote in his Lives of the Fathers, Martyrs, and Other Principal Saints under May 15,

ST. GENEBRARD, OR GENEBERN, MARTYR.
He was a holy Irish priest, who having baptized St. Dympna in her infancy, was her attendant in her flight beyond sea, and was beheaded by her murderers. His relics were translated to Santbeck in the duchy of Cleves, where his intercession is devoutly implored, especially for relief under the gout and in fevers; and blessed rings which bear his name are used. Dr. Wintringham and Dr. Liger, in their treatises on the gout, inform us that this disorder rages even amongst labourers in the countries about the Rhine, in Silesia and others, where acid wines, such as Rhenish, &c. are much drank. On St. Genebrard, see Colgan, MSS. ad 15 Maij.

== Baring-Gould's account ==
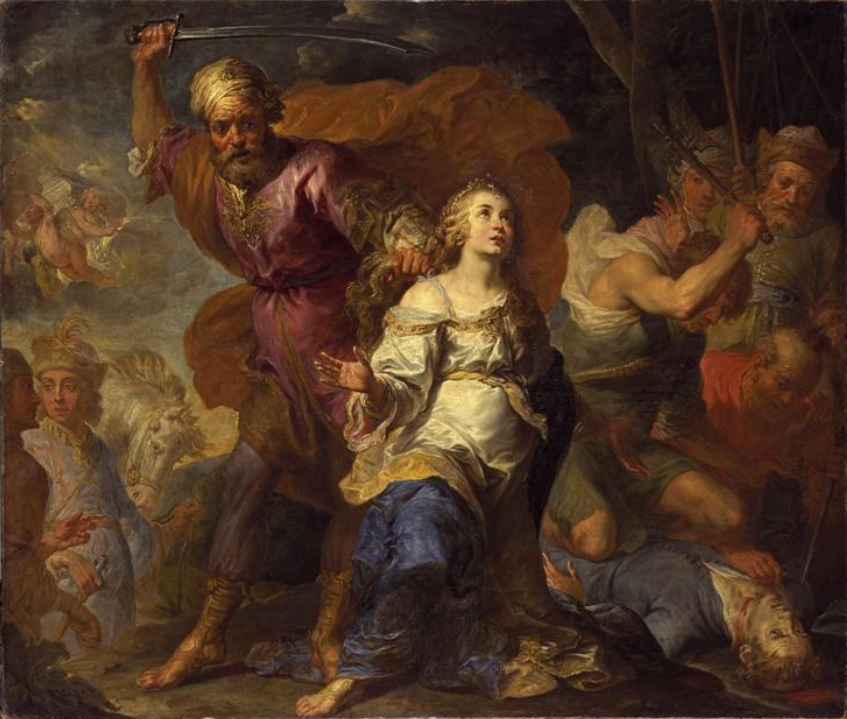
Martyrdom of St Dymphna and St Gerebernus by Jacques de l'Ange

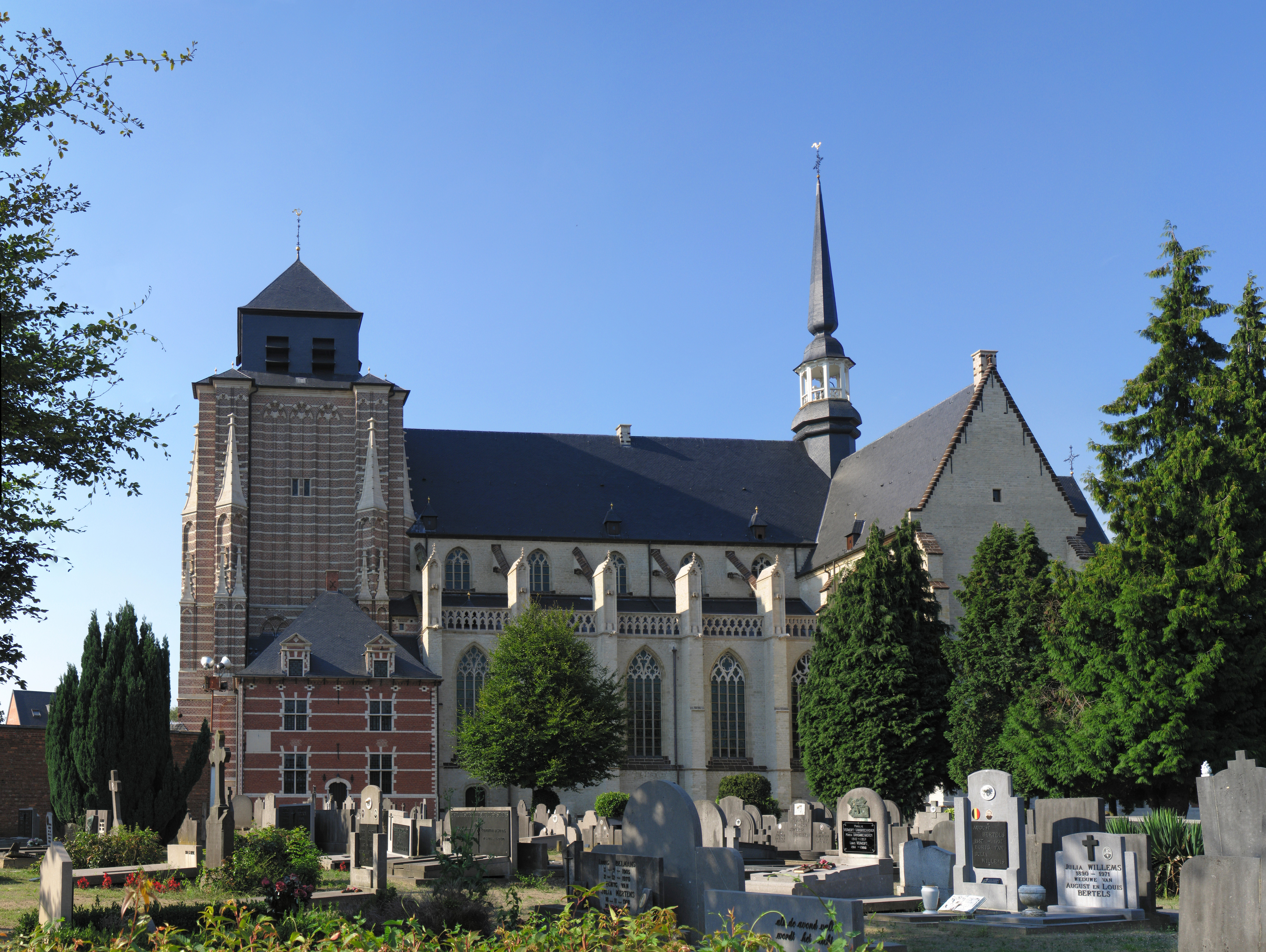
St. Dymphna Church, Geel, Belgium

Sabine Baring-Gould (1834–1924) in his Lives Of The Saints wrote under April 11,

ARTICLE XIII. Commemoration of St. Dympna's and of St. Gerebern's arrival, at Antwerp. Such is the festival, found in a Carthusian Martyrology, at Bruxelles, for the 11th of April, as the Bollandists inform us. Their actions and final martyrdom, in the city of Gheel, will be found, at the 15th of May, which is assigned for their chief feast.

Baring-Gould writes under May 15 of St. Gerebern, or Genebrand, Priest, Martyr and Patron of Sonsbeck after an extensive account of Saint Dympna for the same day. He notes that most of the information is given in sources that described Dympna. He goes on,

His name has been introduced by Thomas Dempster, into the "Menologium Scoticum," at the 15th of May. The Rev. Alban Butler has some notices of St. Gerebrand—a name by which he is likewise known—at this same date. His intercession was devoutly implored, by those suffering from fevers and the gout, in the country about the Rhine...

The old collegiate church of Xanten has no representation or emblems whatever of St. Gerebern, or of his companion, St. Dympna, although this fine building is covered on the interior with various old stone images, wooden figures, and pictures. Nor does any tradition exist, to show that the remains of St. Gerebem were ever brought so near the Rhine... Santen—or as more generally written at the present day Xanten—and Sonsbeck, are places very near each other, and they were formerly known as Santina antiqua. This was one of the capital cities of Cleves; and, it had a representative in the council. Hence, as Henschenius supposes, the people of Sonsbeck and of Xanten might have been allied, in stealing away the body of St. Gerebern, and consequently, this might account for a transference of his remains to Sonsbeck.

At the 20th of July, in the Carthusian Martyrology, we have notice of a feast for the Translation of St. Gerebern, priest, at Xanten, on the Rhine. And Grammay tells us, that in the church of St. Dympna, at Gheel, the head St. Herbern is kept, his body having been translated to Sonsbeck. Among the inhabitants of this latter town, a tradition prevails, that when the people of Xanten brought St. Gerebern's remains to the hill, where his chapel is now erected, those beasts yoked, to a waggon on which the saints relics were borne, could not proceed farther, through some supernatural cause. Wherefore, the Sonsbeck people deposited St. Gerebern's remains on that elevated site, and erected their primitive church over them.

== Sources ==
- Baring-Gould, S. (1897), The Lives Of The Saints: Volume 04 April, London: J. C. Nimmo This article incorporates text from this source, which is in the public domain.
- Baring-Gould, S. (1897b), The Lives Of The Saints: Volume 05 May, London: J. C. Nimmo This article incorporates text from this source, which is in the public domain.
- Butler, Alban (1866), The Lives of the Primitive Fathers, Martyrs, and Other Principal Saints, vol. V, Dublin: James Duffy This article incorporates text from this source, which is in the public domain.
- Janssen, Heinrich (1998), "Wallfahrten am Niederrhein", Udo Grote (Hg:): Zwei Jahrtausende Geschichte der Kirche am Niederrhein (in German), Münster: Dialogverlag
- Künstlev, Karl (1926), Ikonographie der christlichen Kunst (in German), vol. 2: Ikonographie der Heiligen, Freiburg im Breisgau: Herder
- Réau, Louis (1958), Iconographie de l'art chrétien (in French), vol. 3: Iconographie des saints A – F., Paris: Teilband
- Roßhoff, Bernhard (1986), "Gemeinde Sonsbeck am Niederrhein", Rheinische Kunststätten (in German), Neuss: Neusser Druckerei und Verlag, ISBN 3-88094-529-2
- Samson, Heinrich (1892), Die Heiligen als Kirchenpatrone und ihre Auswahl für die Erzdiöcese Köln und für die Bisthümer Münster, Paderborn, Trier, Hildesheim und Osnabrück (in German), Paderborn: Verlag der Bonifacius-Druckerei
- St. Augustine's Abbey, Ramsgate (1921). The Book of saints : a dictionary of servants of God canonized by the Catholic Church. London: A. & C. Black, ltd. OCLC 671676136. This article incorporates text from this source, which is in the public domain.
- Wensky, Margret (2003), "Kirchen und Konfessionen", Sonsbeck. Die Geschichte der niederrheinischen Gemeinde von der Frühzeit bis zur Gegenwart (in German), Köln: Böhlau, pp. 104–134, ISBN 3-412-06103-4
- Wüsten, Wilhelm (1965), Chronik von Sonsbeck, Sonsbeck
